= HMS Edinburgh (16) =

Edinburgh-class cruiser

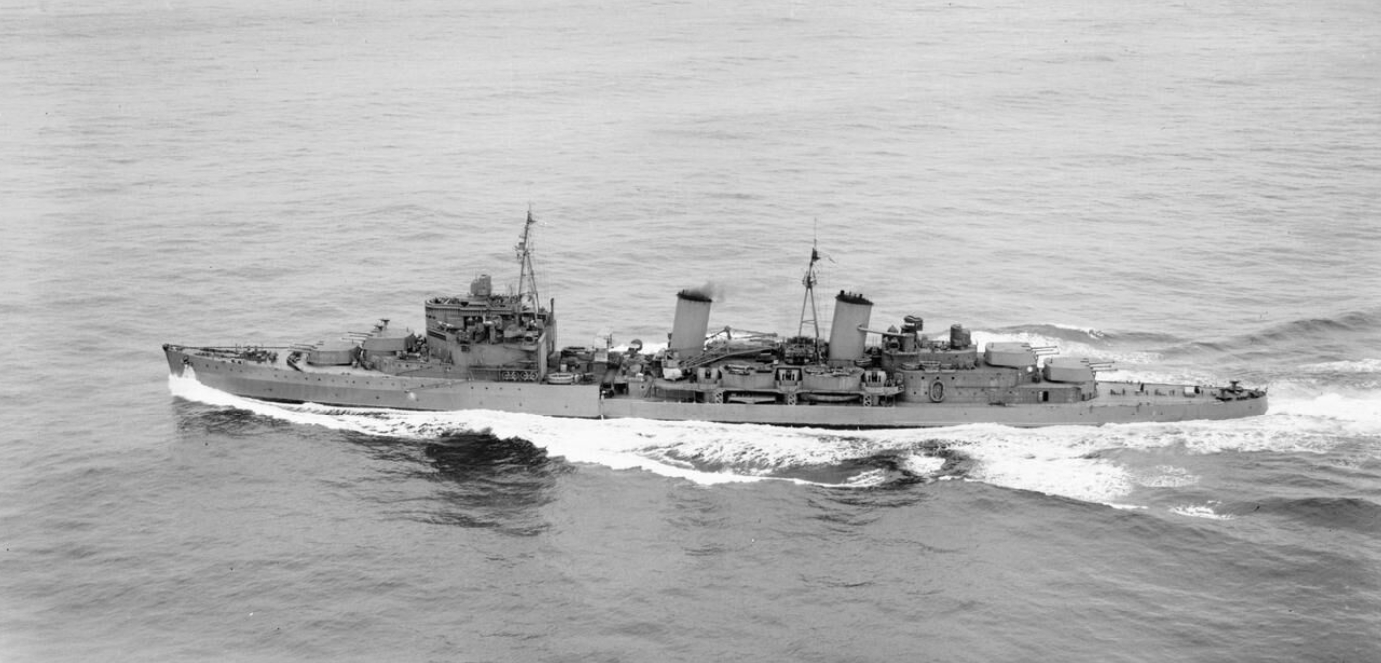
- Edinburgh at Scapa Flow in October 1941

History

United Kingdom
- Name: HMS Edinburgh
- Builder: Swan Hunter, Tyne and Wear
- Laid down: 30 December 1936
- Launched: 31 March 1938
- Commissioned: 6 July 1939
- Out of service: 2 May 1942
- Identification: Pennant number: 16
- Fate: Scuttled 2 May 1942

General characteristics
- Class & type: Town-class light cruiser
- Displacement: 10,550 tons (13,175 tons full load)
- Length: 613.6 ft (187.0 m)
- Beam: 64.9 ft (19.8 m)
- Draught: 22.6 ft (6.9 m)
- Propulsion: Four-shaft Parsons geared turbines; Four Admiralty 3-drum boilers; 82,500 shp (61,500 kW)
- Speed: 32 knots (59 km/h)
- Complement: 750
- Armament: 12 × BL 6-inch Mk XXIII naval guns (152 mm) in triple turrets; 12 × QF 4-inch (101.6 mm) Mk XVI guns; Two octuple mount QF 2-pounder (40 mm) AA guns; 8 × 0.5-inch (12.7 mm) Vickers machine guns; 6 × 21-inch (533 mm) torpedo tubes
- Aircraft carried: Two Walrus aircraft (Removed in the latter part of World War II)

HMS Edinburgh was a Town-class light cruiser of the Royal Navy, which served during the Second World War. She was one of the last two Town class cruisers, which formed the Edinburgh sub-class. Edinburgh saw a great deal of combat service during the Second World War, especially in the North Sea and the Arctic Sea, where she was sunk by torpedoes in 1942.

== Construction and specifications ==
Edinburgh was built in Newcastle-upon-Tyne by Swan Hunter and Wigham Richardson, her keel laid down on 30 December 1936. She was a fast cruiser, with a full load displacement of 13,175 long tons (13,386 t), and an intended sea speed of 32.25 knots (59.73 km/h). On trials in May 1940, she attained a speed of 32.73 knots (60.62 km/h) knots using 81,630 shp on a displacement of 10,550 long tons (10,720 t). .

The ship was heavily armed for a light cruiser, with twelve 6 inch guns, twelve (later eight) 4 inch anti-aircraft (AA) guns (along with her sister ship, the heaviest 4-in battery among all the British cruisers), sixteen 2-pounder pom pom guns, in addition to sixteen Vickers .50 machine guns. Also, she carried six 21 inch (533 mm) torpedoes in a pair of triple racks, giving the ship extra firepower.

Edinburgh was designed as a very modern vessel, equipped with an impressive radar array and fire-control systems, and the ability to carry up to three Supermarine Walrus seaplanes for reconnaissance, though she usually carried only two.

Her armour thickness statistics were 4.88 inches (124 mm) on the main belt, and 1.5 in (38 mm) at its thinnest, the heaviest of all the British light cruisers. As with battlecruisers, light cruisers were intended to be fast enough to avoid engagements with more heavily armed opponents, negating the need for immensely thick armour like that found on the battleships of the day.

== War service ==
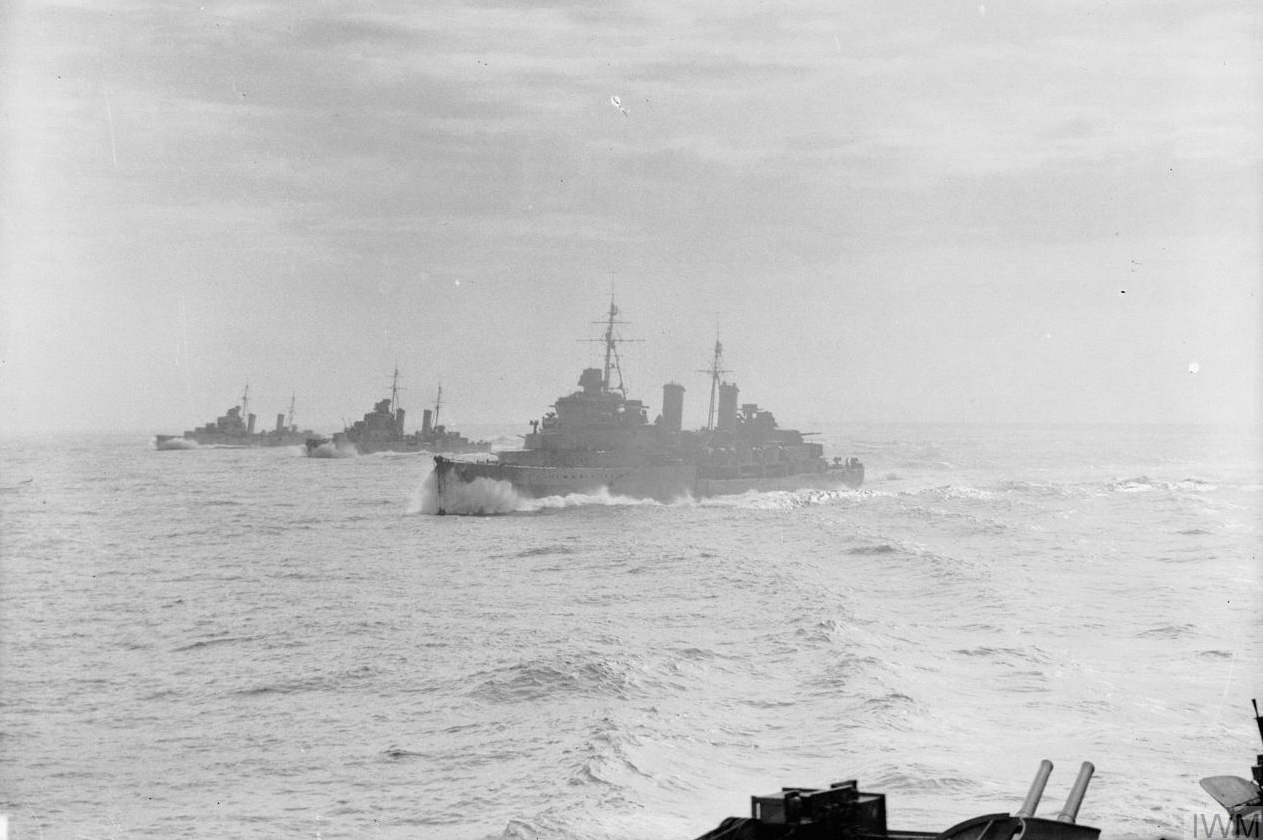
Edinburgh with the cruisers Hermione and Euryalus on convoy duty during Operation Halberd in September 1941.

Edinburgh was launched on 31 March 1938, and after commissioning in July 1939 joined the 18th Cruiser Squadron at Scapa Flow, in Scotland, as part of the Home Fleet. For a time, she was assigned to patrol between Iceland and the Faroe Islands, but in 1939, she was transferred to the 2nd Cruiser Squadron, serving with the Humber Force.

Edinburgh was still in the Firth of Forth when the Luftwaffe made their first raid on the naval bases at Rosyth on 16 October 1939. She sustained minor damage from the attack but no direct hits. Between the three ships damaged in the raid including Edinburgh, the cruiser Southampton, and destroyer Mohawk; sixteen Royal Navy crew died and a further 44 were wounded, although this information was not made public at the time.

She left Rosyth on 23 October, escorting convoys heading to and from Narvik, in Norway. When the armed merchant cruiser Rawalpindi was attacked and sunk defending her convoy on 23 November, Edinburgh was among the flotilla detached to search for the battleship Scharnhorst. The search was unsuccessful, and Edinburgh returned to escort duties.

On 18 March 1940, she arrived in the Tyne for a lengthy refit which lasted until 28 October. After these repairs, she was returned to the 18th Cruiser Squadron, and on 18 November left Faslane Naval Base, on the Clyde, escorting the troop convoy WS4B as far as Freetown (now Sierra Leone) before returning to Scapa Flow on 12 November. Shortly before Christmas, Edinburgh participated in a hunt for a German surface raider that had been reported breaking out into the North Atlantic. The force consisted of the battlecruiser Hood, Edinburgh, and the destroyers HMS Electra, Echo, Escapade and Cossack. After spending a week at sea, including Christmas Day, after the report turned out to be false, she returned to port on New Year's Eve.

During the winter of 1940, Edinburgh took part in several minor operations with the Home Fleet. She escorted Convoy WS7 to the Middle East, returning to Scapa Flow on 15 April. She supported several mine-laying operations off the Danish coast, and supported Operation Claymore, an Allied raid on the German-occupied Lofoten Islands, on 4 May 1941.

Edinburgh played a minor role in the hunt for the German battleship Bismarck in May 1941. She was on patrol in the Bay of Biscay, where she intercepted the German vessel Lech on 22 May 1941. Edinburgh was sent to intercept Bismarck on her projected course for Brest, and then shadow her, but Bismarck never reached that area.

On 1 June, she was sent to relieve the Dido-class light cruiser HMS Hermione on the Denmark Strait patrol route. After an uneventful assignment, she was ordered to cover another Middle East-bound Convoy, WS 9B, and docked in Gibraltar again in early July. Later that month, Edinburgh took part in Operation Substance, arriving in Malta on 24 July. The next day, she had a close call when a German torpedo bomber attacked her but sustained no damage and continued on her course back to the Clyde.

In August 1941, Edinburgh escorted Convoy WS10 to Simonstown, South Africa, and later sailed to Malta once more, this time as part of Operation Halberd, arriving at Malta on 28 September. She returned to Gibraltar shortly afterwards, departing from there on 1 October 1941, with supplies and prisoners of war aboard, and bound once more for the Clyde. After repairs at Faslane, she rejoined the Home Fleet on Iceland Forces Patrol during November.

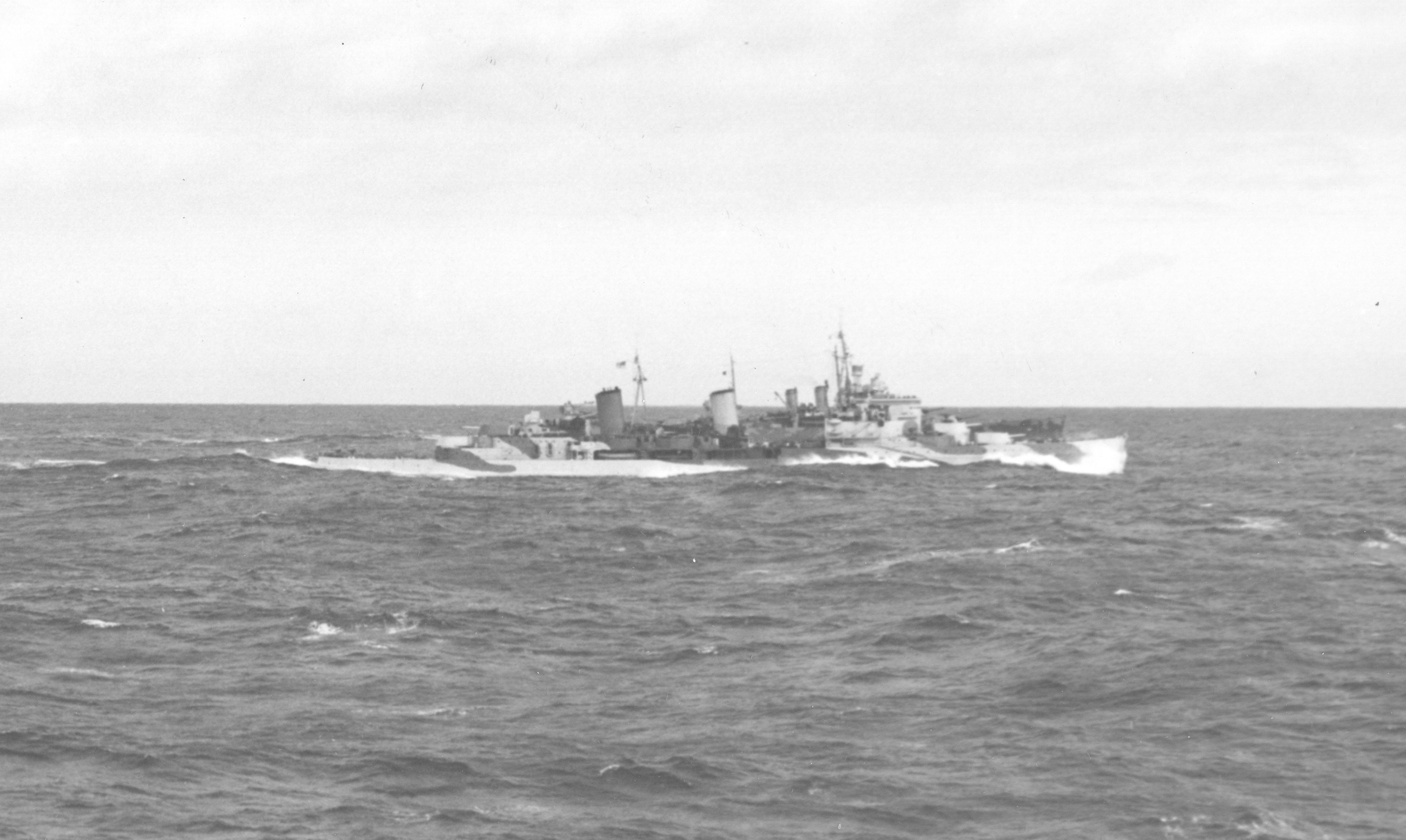
Edinburgh on 3 April 1942. The funnels of USS Wichita are visible beyond Edinburgh.

In December 1941, she provided cover to Arctic convoys bringing aid to the Soviet Union. From January 1942, she refitted in the Tyne, until 4 March, when she was once again placed on the Iceland–Faroes patrol.

She escorted two convoys to the Soviet Union (Convoy QP 4 and Convoy PQ 13), returning to Scapa Flow on 28 March. On 6 April, she left Scapa Flow to escort convoy PQ 14 to Murmansk. Of the 24 ships in the convoy, 16 were forced by unseasonal ice and bad weather to return to Iceland, and another was sunk by a U-boat. Edinburgh and the remaining seven vessels arrived in Murmansk on 19 April.

=== Sinking ===
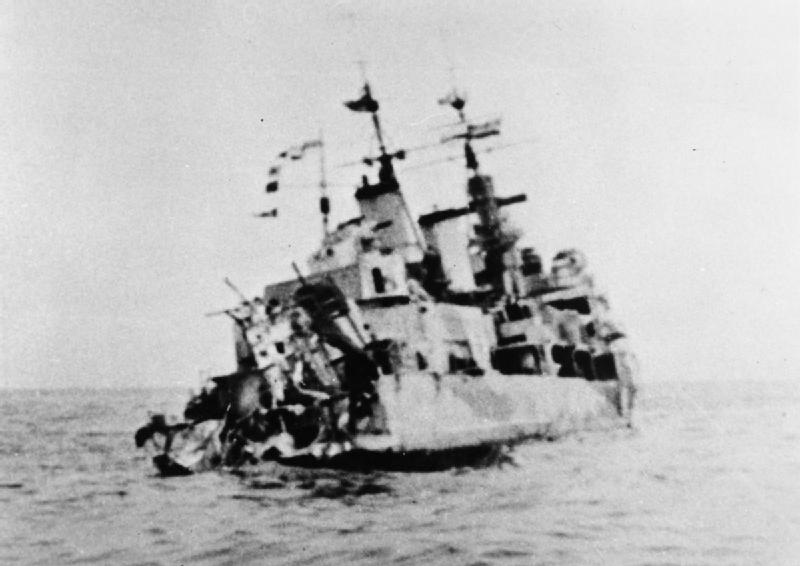
Edinburgh's wrecked stern after being torpedoed by U-456 on 30 April 1942.

Edinburgh was the flagship of Rear-Admiral Stuart Bonham Carter, commanding the escort of returning Convoy QP 11: 17 ships which left Murmansk on 28 April 1942. On 30 April, German submarine U-456 fired a torpedo into her starboard side, hitting her just forward of the space in which the gold she was carrying as part of the Soviet payment for war materials was stored. The U-boat, on her fifth patrol, had been alerted to the convoy by German aerial reconnaissance. The ship began to list severely but the crew closed watertight bulkheads, which prevented the ship from sinking immediately. Soon after, U-456 put a second torpedo into Edinburgh's stern, wrecking her steering equipment and crippling her. In anticipation of Edinburgh's sinking, Stoker Francis James Dawson recovered her flag, later returning it to the Leith Museum in Edinburgh.

Edinburgh was taken in tow, and tried to return to Murmansk with destroyers HMS Foresight and Forester, and four Halcyon-class minesweepers; HMS Gossamer, Harrier, Niger and Hussar. Along the way she was attacked constantly by German torpedo bombers. On 2 May, as she progressed at a snail's pace under tow and her own power, she was attacked off Bear Island by three large German destroyers, Hermann Schoemann, Z24 and Z25.

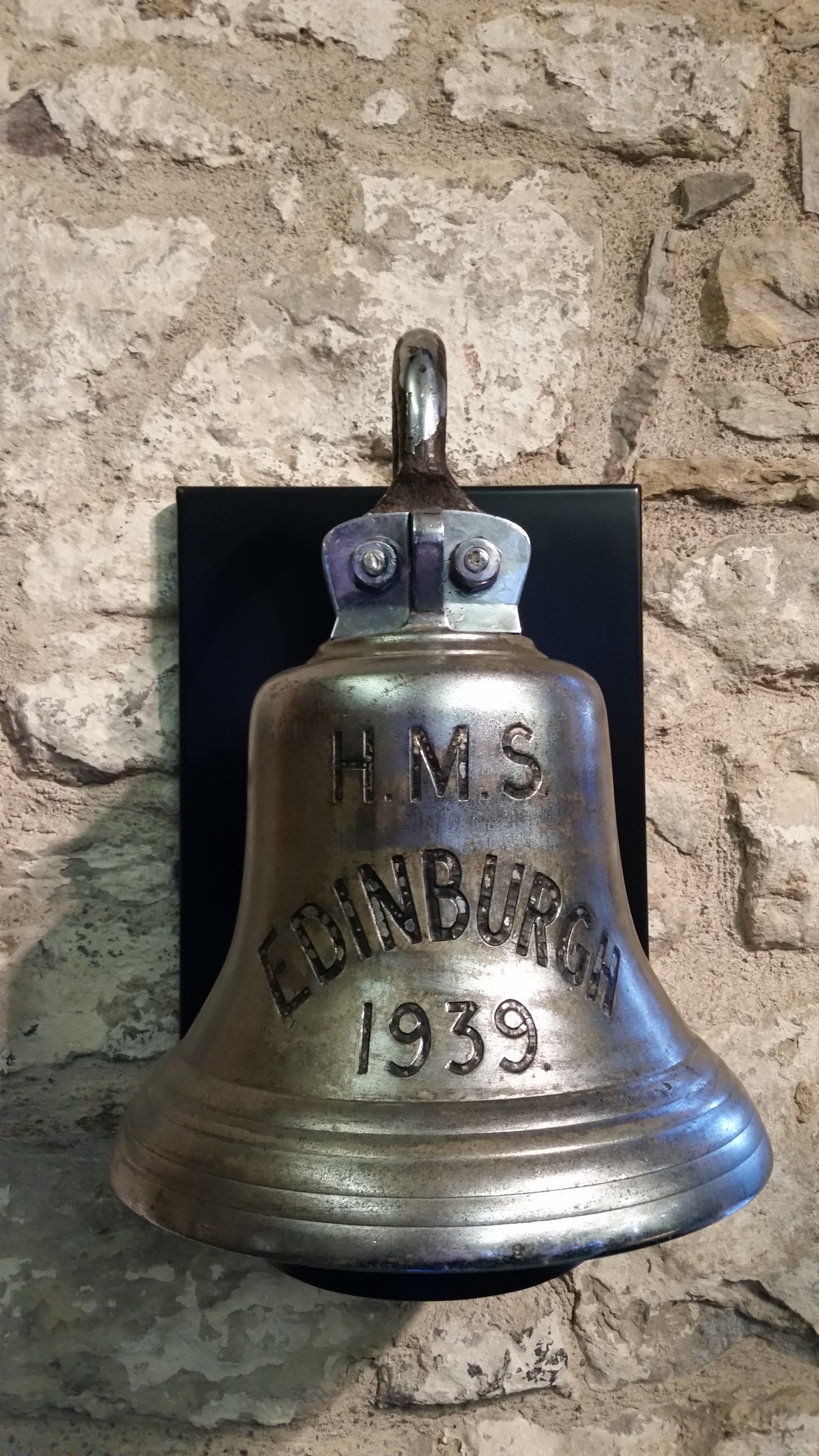
HMS Edinburgh bell on display at Edinburgh Castle

Edinburgh cast off the tow, so that she started to sail in circles. Although her guns were in disarray, she fired on the attacking German ships. Edinburgh's second salvo hit Hermann Schoemann, leaving her in a sinking condition. Edinburgh's escorts drove off Z24 and Z25 but she was struck by a torpedo that had missed another ship. The torpedo struck Edinburgh amidships, opposite the first torpedo hit from U-456. She was now held together only by the deck plating and keel, which was likely to fail at any time, so the crew abandoned ship. Gossamer took off 440 men and Harrier about 400. Two officers and 56 ratings were killed in the attacks. The vigorous action of the minesweepers led the Germans to mistake the power of the force they were facing.

Harrier tried to scuttle Edinburgh with 4-inch gunfire, but twenty rounds did not sink her. Depth charges dropped alongside also failed. Finally, Foresight sank Edinburgh with her last torpedo (the others having been expended against the German destroyers), the torpedo being fired by David Loram (later to become Vice-Admiral Sir David Loram).

== Gold salvage ==
On the return journey, Edinburgh was carrying 4.5 long tons (4,570 kg) of gold bullion back to Britain. The consignment, which had a value of about £1.5 million sterling in 1942 (£61 million in 2025 without taking into account the increase in the value of gold) was part-payment by the USSR for the supplies of war material and military equipment from the Western Allies. The ship had 465 gold ingots in 93 wooden boxes stored in the bomb-room just aft of where the first torpedo, fired from U-456, struck.

Nine years after the Second World War, the British government offered the salvage rights on Edinburgh to the British salvage company, Risdon Beazley Ltd., in 1954. The project had to wait because of strained political relations with the Soviet Union. In 1957, the wreck was designated as a war grave, which further complicated any recovery attempts because of the limitations in salvage techniques of the era. In the late 1970s, the British government became increasingly anxious to recover the gold; not only because of its value but also because there was a growing concern that the wreck might be looted by unscrupulous salvagers or by the Soviet Union.

In the early 1980s, seasoned diver Keith Jessop's company Jessop Marine, with the full guidance and support of Wharton Williams Ltd – a global diving company, and OSA – a German specialist shipping company, won a contract to attempt a recovery. Cutting into the wreck by divers was deemed more appropriate for a war grave than the traditional 'smash and grab' explosives methods. The consortium of specialist companies for the project was then formed: Wharton Williams as managers, OSA and Decca. This group was contracted to Jessop Marine to attempt a recovery of the gold.

In April 1981, the OSA survey ship Dammtor, with Decca surveyors embarked under the direction of former Royal Naval Survey officer John Clarke, began searching for the wreck in the Barents Sea. The area was approximately 150 miles (240 km) north of the coast of the USSR and Norway. After less than 48 hours, Decca discovered the wreck at 72°N 35°E, about 400 kilometres (250 mi) NNE off the Soviet coast at the Kola Inlet. The depth was 245 metres (800 ft). Deploying a Scorpio ROV, Dammtor took detailed film of the wreck, which allowed Wharton Williams and OSA to evaluate a recovery project. The survival of her twin sister ship Belfast lying in the Thames, permitted management and later the diving team to inspect and absorb the layout of the compartments surrounding the bomb room and the scale of the challenge in cutting into the ship 800 feet down in a hostile and remote location.

Later that year, on 30 August, the German VTG dive-support vessel Stephaniturm steamed to the site from Peterhead and the diving operation began in earnest under the leadership of former RN Clearance Diving Officer, Mike Stewart. On 15 September 1981, diver John Rossier found the first bar of gold. By 7 October, when bad weather finally forced the cessation of the diving operation, 431 of 465 ingots had been recovered. At the time the haul was worth in excess of £40,000,000 sterling (in 2020 worth around £140,000,000).

A further 29 bars were brought up in 1986 by the Consortium, bringing the total to 460, leaving five unaccounted for.

The 1981 salvage of the gold on HMS Edinburgh at 256m was the first commercial use of helium reclaim systems.
