= HMS Foresight (H68) =

British F-class destroyer

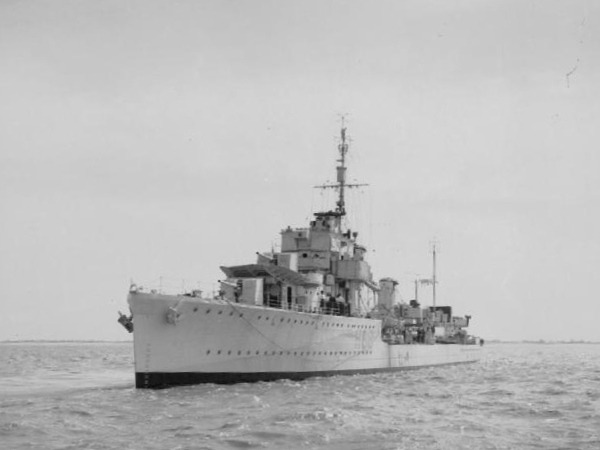
- Foresight in 1942

History

United Kingdom
- Name: Foresight
- Ordered: 17 March 1933
- Builder: Cammell Laird, Birkenhead
- Laid down: 31 July 1933
- Launched: 29 June 1934
- Completed: 15 May 1935
- Identification: Pennant number: H68
- Fate: Sunk, 13 August 1942

General characteristics (as built)
- Class & type: F-class destroyer
- Displacement: 1,405 long tons (1,428 t) (standard)
- Length: 329 ft (100.3 m) o/a
- Beam: 33 ft 3 in (10.13 m)
- Draught: 12 ft 6 in (3.81 m) (deep)
- Installed power: 3 × Admiralty 3-drum boilers; 36,000 shaft horsepower (27,000 kW)
- Propulsion: 2 × shafts; 2 × geared steam turbines
- Speed: 35.5 knots (65.7 km/h; 40.9 mph)
- Range: 6,350 nmi (11,760 km; 7,310 mi) at 15 knots (28 km/h; 17 mph)
- Complement: 145
- Sensors & processing systems: ASDIC
- Armament: 4 × single 4.7 in (120 mm) guns; 2 × quadruple 0.5 in (12.7 mm) machine guns; 2 × quadruple 21 in (533 mm) torpedo tubes; 20 × depth charges, 1 rack and 2 throwers

HMS Foresight was one of nine F-class destroyers built for the Royal Navy during the 1930s. She was assigned to the Home Fleet upon completion. Unlike her sister ships, she does not appear to have been attached to the Mediterranean Fleet in 1935–36 during the Abyssinia Crisis, nor did she enforce the arms blockade imposed by Britain and France on both sides of the conflict the Spanish Civil War of 1936–1939. The ship escorted the larger ships of the fleet during the early stages of World War II and played a minor role in the Norwegian Campaign of 1940. Foresight was sent to Gibraltar in mid-1940 and formed part of Force H where she participated in the attack on Mers-el-Kébir and the Battle of Dakar. The ship escorted numerous convoys to Malta in 1941 and Arctic convoys during 1942. Later that year, Foresight participated in Operation Pedestal, another convoy to Malta. She was torpedoed by an Italian aircraft on 12 August and had to be scuttled the next day.

== Description ==
The F-class ships were repeats of the preceding E-class destroyers. They displaced 1,405 long tons (1,428 t) at standard load and 1,940 long tons (1,970 t) at deep load. The ships had an overall length of 329 feet (100.3 m), a beam of 33 feet 3 inches (10.1 m) and a draught of 12 feet 6 inches (3.8 m). They were powered by two Parsons geared steam turbines, each driving one propeller shaft, using steam provided by three Admiralty three-drum boilers. The turbines developed a total of 36,000 shaft horsepower (27,000 kW) and gave a maximum speed of 35.5 knots (65.7 km/h; 40.9 mph). Foresight carried a maximum of 470 long tons (480 t) of fuel oil that gave her a range of 6,350 nautical miles (11,760 km; 7,310 mi) at 15 knots (28 km/h; 17 mph). The ships' complement was 145 officers and ratings.

The ships mounted four 4.7-inch (120 mm) Mark IX guns in single mounts, designated 'A', 'B', 'X', and 'Y' in sequence from front to rear. For anti-aircraft (AA) defence, they had two quadruple Mark I mounts for the 0.5 inch Vickers Mark III machine gun. The F class was fitted with two above-water quadruple torpedo tube mounts for 21-inch (533 mm) torpedoes. One depth charge rack and two throwers were fitted; 20 depth charges were originally carried, but this increased to 38 shortly after the war began.

=== Wartime modifications ===
Between October 1940 and April 1941, Foresight had her rear torpedo tubes replaced by a 12-pounder AA gun. Around this time, she probably had two single 20 mm (0.8 in) Oerlikon light AA guns installed abreast the bridge. By July 1942, a Type 286 short-range surface search radar was fitted as was a HF/DF radio direction finder mounted on a pole mainmast.

== Construction and career ==
Foresight was ordered on 17 March 1933 from Cammell Laird and was laid down at their Birkenhead shipyard on 31 July, launched on 29 June 1934, and completed on 15 May 1935. The ship cost 245,428 pounds, excluding government-furnished equipment such as the armament. All of the F-class destroyers were assigned to the 6th Destroyer Flotilla (DF) of the Home Fleet, and, Foresight, unlike her sisters, did not leave home waters during the 1930s. The 6th DF was renumbered the 8th Destroyer Flotilla in April 1939, and Foresight remained assigned to it until July 1940. World War II began in September and she was tasked to escort the larger ships of the fleet during this time. She played a minor role in the Norwegian Campaign in early 1940.

In late June, the 8th DF was ordered to Gibraltar where they were to form the escorts for Force H. A few days later, they participated in the attack on Mers-el-Kébir against the Vichy French ships stationed there. On 13 September, Force H rendezvoused with a convoy that was carrying troops intended to capture Dakar from the Vichy French. Ten days later, they attacked Dakar where Foresight and the destroyer Inglefield sank the French submarine Persée and Foresight sank the submarine Bévéziers on the 25th. She returned home for a refit after the battle and was damaged by a near-miss during a German air raid on Liverpool on the night of 21/22 December.

On 31 January 1941, Force H, including Foresight, departed Gibraltar to carry out Operation Picket, an unsuccessful night torpedo attack by eight of Ark Royal's Fairey Swordfish on the Tirso Dam in Sardinia. The British ships returned to Gibraltar on 4 February and began preparing for Operation Grog, a naval bombardment of Genoa, that was successfully carried out five days later. Two months later, Foresight escorted the aircraft carrier Ark Royal as she flew off aircraft for the beleaguered island of Malta near Sicily on 3 April and again on the 27th. The following month she was part of the escort screen, with five other destroyers, for the battleship Queen Elizabeth and the light cruisers Naiad, Fiji and Gloucester which were joining the Mediterranean Fleet. This was part of Operation Tiger which included a supply convoy taking tanks to Egypt and the transfer of warships to and from the Mediterranean Fleet. Foresight and her sisters had their Two-Speed Destroyer Sweep (TSDS) minesweeping gear rigged to allow them to serve as fast minesweepers en route to Malta. Despite this, one merchant ship was sunk by mines and another damaged. Later that month, she escorted the capital ships of Force H as they searched for the German battleship Bismarck and the heavy cruiser Prinz Eugen in the North Atlantic after the Battle of the Denmark Strait on 23 May. Foresight escorted another flying-off mission to Malta on 14 June; two days later, after German blockade runners reached France, Force H sortied into the Atlantic on a failed search for more blockade runners. Together with her sisters Faulknor, Fearless, Forester and Foxhound, Foresight helped to sink the German submarine U-138 on 18 June. The ship participated in another Malta convoy in late July, during which she had to scuttle her sister Fearless, after she had been crippled by an airborne torpedo on 23 July. Foresight continued to escort the ships of Force H until October, after she participated in another convoy to Malta, Operation Halberd. During this operation, the ship again served as a fast minesweeper, albeit more successfully than the last time she had done so.

The 8th DF returned to Britain after Halberd and resumed their previous task of escorting the ships of Home Fleet for the next six months. In early April 1942, Foresight, Forester and the light cruiser Edinburgh were part of the close escort for Convoy PQ 14, bound for Murmansk. The trio were then the close escort for Convoy QP 11, returning from Murmansk to Iceland, when Edinburgh was torpedoed on 29 April. The two hits disabled her steering and she had to be towed by the sisters. Two days later, they were attacked by three German destroyers which badly damaged the two destroyers and put another torpedo into Edinburgh, crippling her. Foresight had eight men killed and eleven wounded during the battle. The two destroyers took off the survivors from the cruiser and Foresight scuttled the cruiser with a torpedo. Temporarily repaired at Murmansk, the sisters were part of the light cruiser Trinidad's escort home in May. She had to be scuttled on 15 May by the destroyer Matchless after she was set on fire by a German bomber. Foresight spent June under repair.

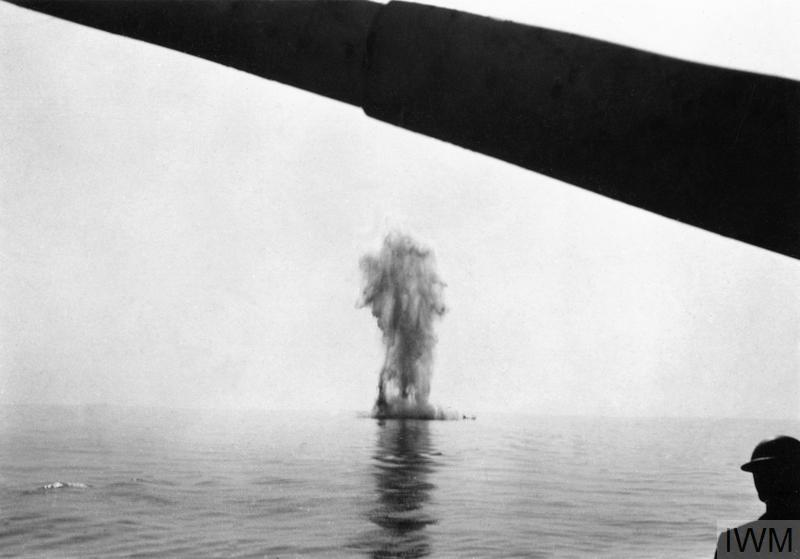
Foresight being scuttled by Tartar's torpedoes

Foresight was assigned to the convoy escort force for Operation Pedestal, a heavily escorted convoy to Malta in August. On the 12th, she was torpedoed by an Italian Savoia-Marchetti SM.79 bomber at 18:45; the hit broke her back, knocked out her steering, and killed one officer and three ratings. By the time the destroyer HMS Tartar arrived, Foresight could only steam at two knots (3.7 km/h; 2.3 mph) and a towline was secured by 19:30. Shortly afterwards, the towing wire fouled Tartar's starboard propeller; another wire was rigged by 20:40, but it had to be slipped when an unknown force of one cruiser and two destroyers was spotted at close range. Around 22:30, Foresight was secured alongside Tartar until 05:15 the following day when the cables snapped. Another tow wire was rigged at 06:10, but it was dropped when a submarine periscope was spotted at 09:30 and Tartar dropped depth charges as a precautionary measure even though her ASDIC had not detected any submarines. Around that same time several Axis shadowing aircraft were seen and Tartar's commander thought the likelihood of attack was now too high to proceed. He took off the 181 surviving crew and scuttled Foresight with torpedoes at 09:55 at coordinates (37°40′N 10°00′E).

== Bibliography ==
- Admiralty Historical Section (2002). The Royal Navy and the Mediterranean. Whitehall histories., Naval Staff histories. Vol. 2, November 1940–December 1941. London: Whitehall History in association with Frank Cass. ISBN 0-7146-5205-9.
- English, John (1993). Amazon to Ivanhoe: British Standard Destroyers of the 1930s. Kendal, England: World Ship Society. ISBN 0-905617-64-9.
- Evans, Arthur S. (2010). Destroyer Down: An Account of HM Destroyer Losses 1939–1945. Barnsley, South Yorkshire, UK: Pen & Sword Maritime. ISBN 978-1-84884-270-0.
- Friedman, Norman (2009). British Destroyers From Earliest Days to the Second World War. Annapolis, Maryland: Naval Institute Press. ISBN 978-1-59114-081-8.
- Haarr, Geirr H. (2010). The Battle for Norway: April–June 1940. Barnsley, UK: Seaforth Publishing. ISBN 978-1-84832-057-4.
- Lenton, H. T. (1998). British & Empire Warships of the Second World War. Annapolis, Maryland: Naval Institute Press. ISBN 1-55750-048-7.
- Rohwer, Jürgen (2005). Chronology of the War at Sea 1939–1945: The Naval History of World War Two (Third Revised ed.). Annapolis, Maryland: Naval Institute Press. ISBN 1-59114-119-2.
- Whitley, M. J. (1988). Destroyers of World War Two: An International Encyclopedia. Annapolis, Maryland: Naval Institute Press. ISBN 0-87021-326-1.
