= Convoy QP 11 =

- Part of the Arctic convoys of the Second World War
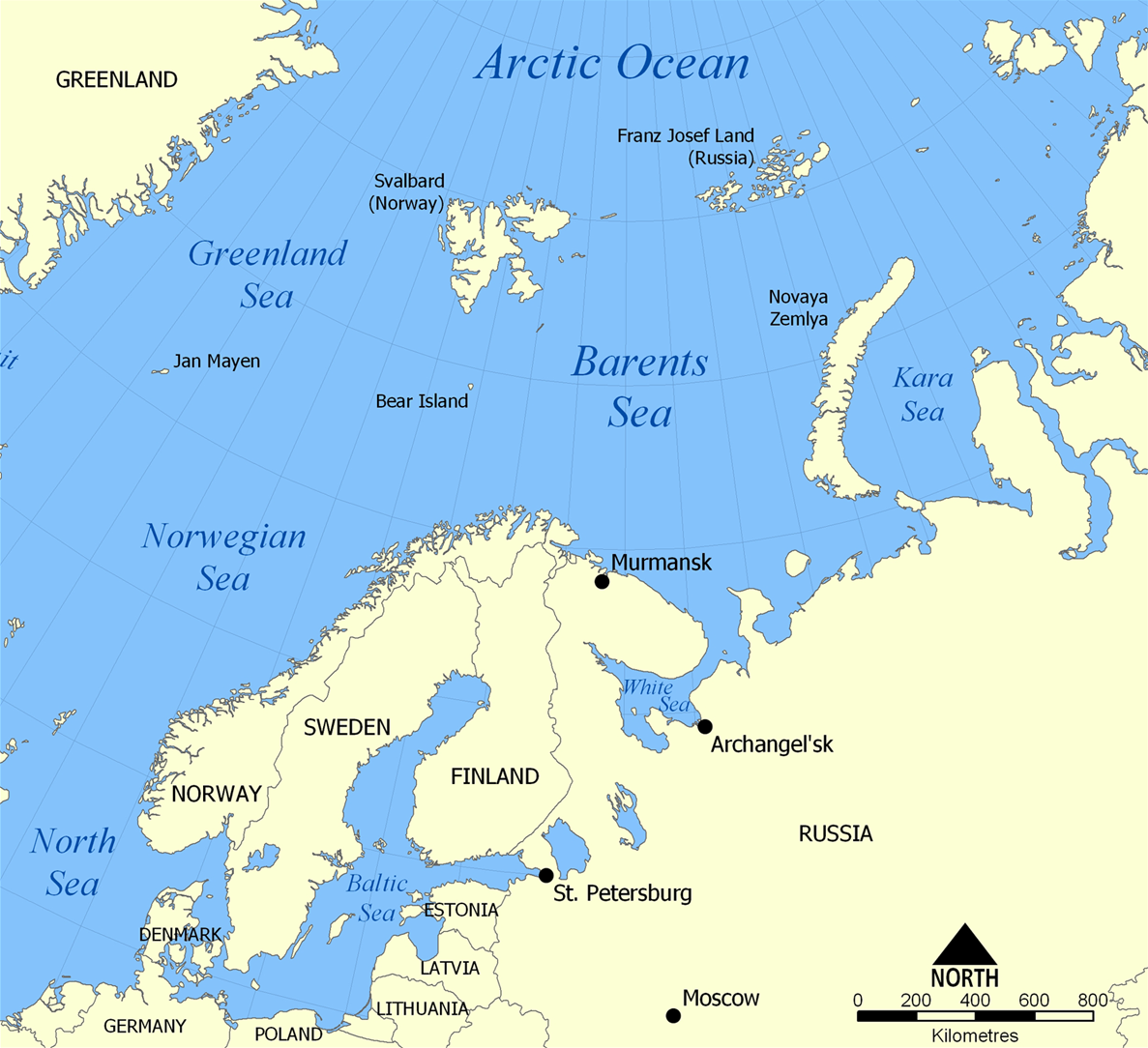
- The location of the Norwegian Sea and the Barents Sea
Date	28 April – 7 May 1942
Location	Norwegian Sea–Barents Sea

Belligerents
Luftwaffe; Kriegsmarine	United Kingdom; Soviet Union; United States

Commanders and leaders
Hermann Boehm; Hubert Schmundt; Alfred Schulze-Hinrichs	Convoy commodore: W. H. Lawrence; Convoy escort: Maxwell Richmond

Strength
3 destroyers; 2 U-boats	1 cruiser; 6 destroyers; 4 minesweeper; 1 guard-ship

Casualties and losses
6 men killed (incomplete); 45 wounded; 1 destroyer sunk	85 men killed (incomplete); 1 cruiser sunk; 3 destroyers damaged; 1 freighter sunk

Convoy QP 11 (28 April – 7 May 1942) was an Arctic convoy of the Second World War, of merchant ships returning from the Soviet Union to Iceland. The convoy consisted of 13 merchant ships, escorted by 18 warships in relays. The convoy was attacked by German destroyers and submarines, losing one merchant ship to the destroyers. The light cruiser HMS Edinburgh was torpedoed by U-456. The British destroyer escorts managed to hold off the German destroyers that attacked the convoy five times before they disengaged to search for Edinburgh.

The German flotilla attacked Edinburgh and Z7 Hermann Schoemann was severely damaged by Edinburgh. Hermann Schoemann was scuttled, after the two remaining German destroyers took off the crew. Edinburgh was hit by a torpedo from Z25 opposite the site of the first hit and its survivors were taken off by the minesweepers HMS Gossamer and HMS Harrier, then HMS Foresight sank Edinburgh with a torpedo. The convoy reached Iceland on 7 April, having suffered only the loss of the Soviet vessel Tsiolkovski, despite more engagements with a torpedo-bomber and several U-boats.

On 13 May, after temporary repairs, HMS Trinidad sailed from Murmansk with four destroyer escorts, to rendezvous with elements of the Home Fleet. On 15 May the cruiser was bombed, caught fire and was then scuttled by HMS Matchless, the destroyers then making for the cruiser rendezvous, attacked by Junkers Ju 88 bombers. When the masts of big ships were seen, there was apprehension that they were German ships but they turned out to be the British cruisers. The ships reached Iceland and then Scapa Flow to land the wounded.

Admirals Stuart Bonham Carter, John Tovey, the commander of the Home Fleet and the First Sea Lord, Admiral Dudley Pound, were concerned that the recent German convoy operations foreshadowed more combined-arms attacks against Arctic convoys. As the hours of daylight increased, the weather improved and the number of German U-boats and Luftwaffe aircraft increased, they predicted that convoy losses could only increase. They also acknowledged that the political necessity of supporting the Soviet Union meant that the convoys must continue.

== Background ==
=== Lend-lease ===
The Soviet leaders needed to replace the colossal losses of military equipment lost after the German invasion, especially when Soviet war industries were being moved out of the war zone and emphasised tank and aircraft deliveries. Machine tools, steel and aluminium was needed to replace indigenous resources lost in the invasion. The pressure on the civilian sector of the economy needed to be limited by food deliveries. The Soviets wanted to concentrate the resources that remained on items that the Soviet war economy had the greatest comparative advantage over the German economy. Aluminium imports allowed aircraft production to a far greater extent than would have been possible using local sources and tank production was emphasised at the expense of lorries and food supplies were squeezed by reliance on what could be obtained from lend–lease. At the Moscow Conference, it was acknowledged that 1.5 million tons of shipping was needed to transport the supplies of the First Protocol and that Soviet sources could provide less than 10 per cent of the carrying capacity.

The British and Americans accepted that the onus was on them to find most of the shipping, despite their commitments in other theatres. The Prime Minister, Winston Churchill, made a promise to send a convoy to the Arctic ports of the USSR every ten days and to deliver 1,200 tanks a month from July 1942 to January 1943, followed by 2,000 tanks and another 3,600 aircraft more than already promised. In November, the US president, Franklin D. Roosevelt, ordered Admiral Emory Land of the US Maritime Commission and then the head of the War Shipping Administration that deliveries to Russia should only be limited by 'insurmountable difficulties'. The first convoy was due at Murmansk around 12 October and the next convoy was to depart Iceland on 22 October. A motley of British, Allied and neutral shipping loaded with military stores and raw materials for the Soviet war effort would be assembled at Hvalfjörður in Iceland, convenient for ships from both sides of the Atlantic.

From Operation Dervish to Convoy PQ 11, the supplies to the USSR were mostly British, in British ships defended by the Royal Navy. A fighter force that could defend Murmansk was delivered that protected the Arctic ports and railways into the hinterland. Before September 1941 the British had dispatched 450 aircraft, 22,000 long tons (22,000 t) of rubber, 3,000,000 pairs of boots and stocks of tin, aluminium, jute, lead and wool. In September representatives from Britain and the United States travelled to Moscow to study Soviet requirements and their ability to meet them. The representatives of the three countries drew up a protocol in October 1941 to last until June 1942. British supplied aircraft and tanks reinforced the Russian defences of Leningrad and Moscow from December 1941. The tanks and aircraft did not save Moscow but were important in the Soviet counter-offensive. The Luftwaffe was by then reduced to 600 operational aircraft on the Eastern Front, to an extent a consequence of Luftflotte 2 being sent to the Mediterranean against the British. Tanks and aircraft supplied by the British helped the Soviet counter-offensive force push the Germans further back than might have been possible. In January and February 1941, deliveries of tanks and aircraft allowed the Russians to have a margin of safety should the Germans attempt to counter-attack.

=== Signals intelligence ===
==== Ultra ====
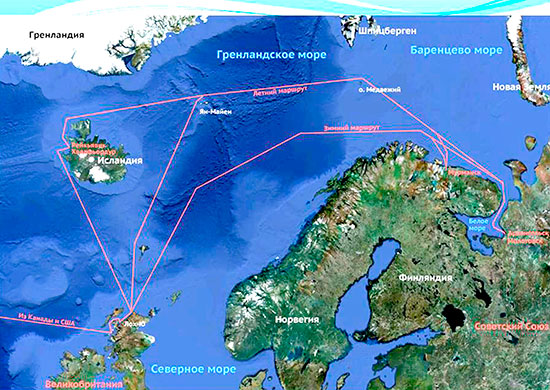
Russian map showing Arctic convoy routes from Britain and Iceland, past Norway to the Barents Sea and northern Russian ports

The British Government Code and Cypher School (GC&CS) based at Bletchley Park housed a small industry of code-breakers and traffic analysts. By June 1941, the German Enigma machine Home Waters (Heimish) settings used by surface ships and U-boats could quickly be read. On 1 February 1942, the Enigma machines used in U-boats in the Atlantic and Mediterranean were changed but German ships and the U-boats in Arctic waters continued with the older Heimish Home Hydra from 1942, Dolphin to the British). By mid-1941, British Y-stations were able to receive and read Luftwaffe W/T transmissions and give advance warning of Luftwaffe operations. In 1941, naval Headache personnel with receivers to eavesdrop on Luftwaffe wireless transmissions were embarked on warships.

=== B-Dienst ===
The rival German Beobachtungsdienst (B-Dienst, Observation Service) of the Kriegsmarine Marinenachrichtendienst (MND, Naval Intelligence Service) had broken several Admiralty codes and cyphers by 1939, which were used to help Kriegsmarine ships elude British forces and provide opportunities for surprise attacks. From June to August 1940, six British submarines were sunk in the Skaggerak using information gleaned from British wireless signals. In 1941, B-Dienst read signals from the Commander in Chief Western Approaches informing convoys of areas patrolled by U-boats, enabling the submarines to move into "safe" zones.

=== Arctic Ocean ===
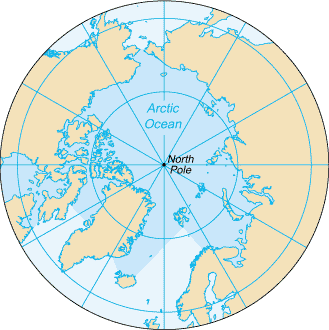
Diagram of the Arctic Ocean

Between Greenland and Norway are some of the most stormy waters of the world's oceans, 890 mi (1,440 km) of water under gales of snow, sleet and hail. The cold Arctic water was met by the Gulf Stream, warm water from the Gulf of Mexico, which became the North Atlantic Drift. Arriving at the south-west of England the drift moves between Scotland and Iceland; north of Norway the drift splits. One stream bears north of Bear Island to Svalbard and a southern stream follows the coast of Murmansk into the Barents Sea. The mingling of cold Arctic water and warmer water of higher salinity generates thick banks of fog for convoys to hide in but the waters drastically reduced the effectiveness of Asdic as U-boats moved in waters of differing temperatures and density.

In winter, polar ice can form as far south as 50 mi (80 km) off the North Cape and in summer it can recede to Svalbard. The area is in perpetual darkness in winter and permanent daylight in the summer and can make air reconnaissance almost impossible. Around the North Cape and in the Barents Sea the sea temperature rarely rises about 4 °C (39 °F) and a man in the water will die unless rescued immediately. The cold water and air makes spray freeze on the superstructure of ships, which has to be removed quickly to avoid the ship becoming top-heavy. Conditions in U-boats were, if anything, worse the boats having to submerge in warmer water to rid the superstructure of ice. Crewmen on watch were exposed to the elements, oil lost its viscosity and nuts froze and sheared off bolts. Heaters in the hull were too demanding of current and could not be run continuously.

== Prelude ==
=== Kriegsmarine ===
German naval forces in Norway were commanded by Hermann Böhm, the Kommandierender Admiral Norwegen. Two U-boats were based in Norway in July 1941, four in September, five in December and four in January 1942. Hitler contemplated establishing a unified command but decided against it. The German battleship Tirpitz arrived at Trondheim on 16 January, the first ship of a general move of surface ships to Norway. British convoys to Russia had received little attention since they averaged only eight ships each and the long Arctic winter nights negated even the limited Luftwaffe reconnaissance effort that was available.

=== Luftflotte 5 ===
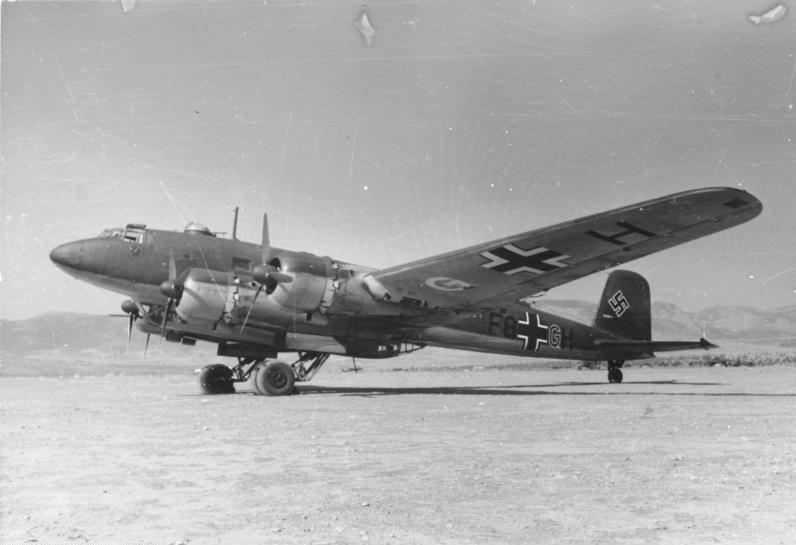
A Focke-Wulf Fw 200 Kondor of KG 40

In mid-1941, Luftflotte 5 (Air Fleet 5) had been re-organised for Operation Barbarossa with Luftgau Norwegen (Air Region Norway) headquartered in Oslo. Fliegerführer Stavanger (Air Commander Stavanger) the centre and north of Norway, Jagdfliegerführer Norwegen (Fighter Leader Norway) commanded the fighter force and Fliegerführer Kerkenes (Oberst [colonel] Andreas Nielsen) in the far north had airfields at Kirkenes and Banak. The Air Fleet had 180 aircraft, sixty of which were reserved for operations on the Karelian Front against the Red Army.

The distance from Banak to Arkhangelsk was 560 mi (900 km) and Fliegerführer Kerkenes had only ten Junkers Ju 88 bombers of Kampfgeschwader 30, thirty Junkers Ju 87 Stuka dive-bombers ten Messerschmitt Bf 109 fighters of Jagdgeschwader 77, five Messerschmitt Bf 110 heavy fighters of Zerstörergeschwader 76, ten reconnaissance aircraft and an anti-aircraft battalion. Sixty aircraft were far from adequate in such a climate and terrain where

...there is no favourable season for operations. (Earl Ziemke [1959] in Claasen [2001])

The emphasis of air operations changed from army support to anti-shipping operations only after March 1942, when Allied Arctic convoys becoming larger and more frequent coincided with the reinforcement of Norway with ships and aircraft and the less extreme climatic conditions of the Arctic summer.

=== Arctic convoys ===
A convoy was defined as at least one merchant ship sailing under the protection of at least one warship. At first the British had intended to run convoys to Russia on a forty-day cycle (the number of days between convoy departures) during the winter of 1941–1942, but this was shortened to a ten-day cycle. The round trip to Murmansk for warships was three weeks and each convoy needed a cruiser and two destroyers, which severely depleted the Home Fleet. Convoys left port and rendezvoused with the escorts at sea. A cruiser provided distant cover from a position to the west of Bear Island. Air support was limited to 330 Squadron and 269 Squadron of RAF Coastal Command from Iceland, with some help from anti-submarine patrols along the coast of Norway from RAF Sullom Voe in Shetland. Anti-submarine trawlers escorted the convoys on the first part of the outward voyage. Built for Arctic conditions, the trawlers were coal-burning ships and had sufficient endurance. The trawlers were commanded by their peacetime crews and captains with the rank of Skipper, Royal Naval Reserve (RNR) who were used to Arctic conditions, supplied by anti-submarine specialists of the Royal Naval Volunteer Reserve (RNVR). British minesweepers based at Arkhangelsk met the convoys to join the escort for the remainder of the voyage.

=== Convoy QP 11 ===
33rd meridian east (interactive map)

The convoy consisted of 13 merchant ships, four American, four British, four Panamanian-registered and one Soviet ship. Five of the vessels had sailed in Convoy PQ 13. The destroyers HMS Amazon, Beagle, Beverley, Bulldog, Foresight and Forester, the Flower-class corvettes HMS Campanula, Oxlip, Saxifrage and Snowflake, with the anti-submarine warfare trawler HMS Lord Middleton. The light cruiser HMS Edinburgh was to provide distant cover and carried 425 ingots of gold worth $20 million, in part-payment by the Soviet Union to the United States for supplies bought before Lend−Lease was extended to the Soviet Union. The convoy commodore, W. H. Lawrence, captain of SS Briarwood and the senior officer, escort, Commander Maxwell Richmond, chaired the convoy conference at Murmansk where the policy of defence against attack by German ships was laid out. The convoy would turn away with the corvettes from an attack as the destroyers kept between the Germans and the convoy.

== Voyage ==
=== 28−29 April ===
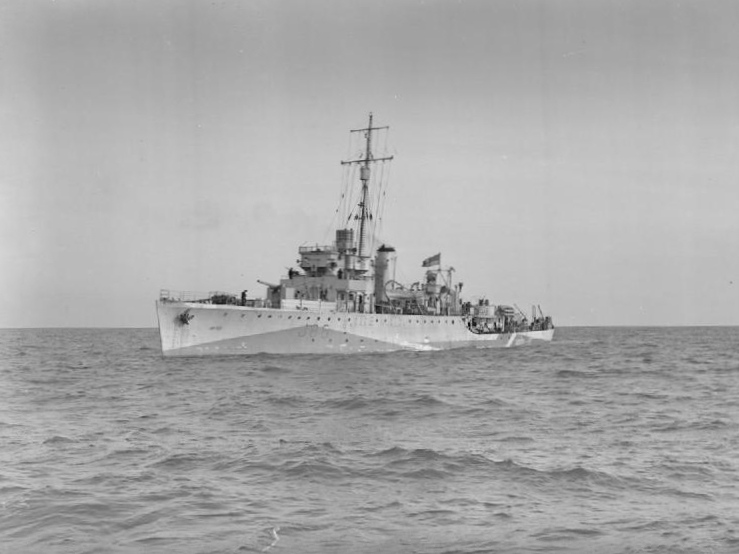
HMS Salamander an example of a Halcyon-class minesweeper photographed in 1943

Convoy QP 11 departed from the Kola Inlet on 28 April 1942 escorted by the eastern local escort of the Soviet destroyers Sokrushitelny and Valerian Kyubishev with Gossamer, Harrier, Hussar and Niger, Halcyon-class minesweepers of the 6th Minesweeper Squadron. On 29 April, the convoy was spotted by a Ju 88 reconnaissance aircraft after the Soviet Air Forces (Voenno-Vozdushnye Sily, VVS) escorts had departed, short of fuel, ahead of schedule. The Admiral Normeer, Konteradmiral Hubert Schmundt, at Kirkenes, held back the destroyers of the 8th Destroyer Flotilla (also the Zerstörergruppe Arktis [Destroyer Group Arctic]) Z7 Hermann Schoemann, Z24 and Z25 from an attack on the convoy due to the chronic fuel shortage and sent the Wolfpack gruppe Strauchritter, comprising seven U-boats instead.

=== 30 April ===
At 4:30 a.m. Huff-Duff operators on the ships detected signals from a U-boat near the convoy (possibly U-88) that was sighted behind the convoy at 7:30 a.m. and attacked, the U-boat submerging and making an ineffectual torpedo attack. U-436 was seen ahead of the convoy that changed course to dodge it. During the day there were several Asdic alarms and depth charge firings around the convoy. At 5:30 p.m. the minesweepers turned back to Murmansk. Admiral Stuart Bonham Carter, embarked on Edinburgh ordered the Captain, Hugh Faulkner, to take Edinburgh 15 nmi (28 km; 17 mi) ahead of the convoy, the ship accelerating to 19 kn (35 km/h; 22 mph) for safety. The U-boats U-436 and U-456, were waiting for the convoy on the 33rd meridian east. At about 4:15 p.m. the Asdic operator reported a contact but allegedly was told to ignore it.

U-436 fired a salvo of four torpedoes that missed Edinburgh and U-456 fired torpedoes on the starboard side of the cruiser, obtaining two hits. One hit the forward boiler room that flooded, the other hit the rear of the ship, blowing off the stern, the rudder, disabled the inner two propeller shafts and bent the quarterdeck back over Y turret. Bunker fuel and seawater entered the ship, causing it to slow, take on a list and go down at the bow. Kapitänleutnant Max-Martin Teichert, the commander of U-456, watched Edinburgh by periscope as he had run out of torpedoes. Edinburgh turned towards Murmansk, using its outer propellers. At the convoy a column of water was seen, then black smoke, followed by a signal that Edinburgh had been torpedoed. Foresight, Forester, Sokrushitelny and Valerian Kyubishev detached from the convoy, keeping the U-boats away from Edinburgh as they reported the success to the Admiral Nordmeer.

==== HMS Edinburgh (1−2 May) ====
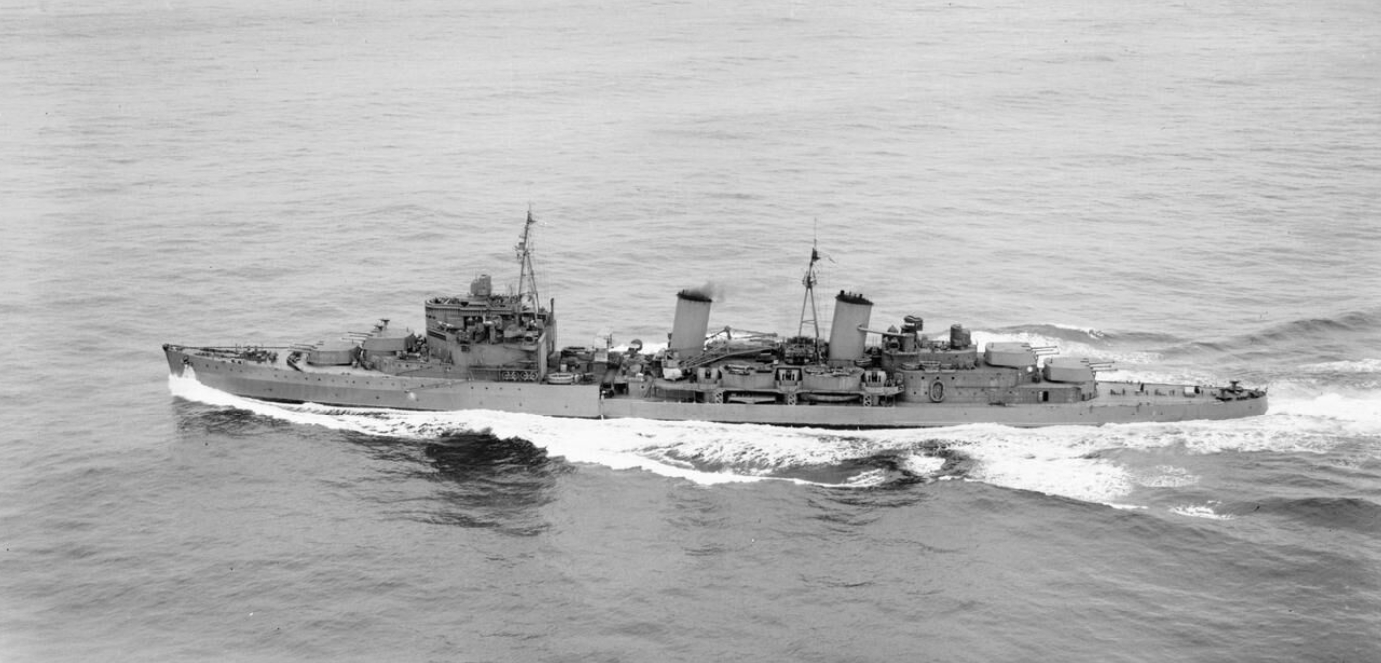
Photograph of HMS Edinburgh taken on 28 October 1941

Edinburgh was badly damaged and left the convoy to return towards Murmansk, escorted by Foresight and Forester. Several ships were sent from Murmansk to assist Edinburgh, among them the Soviet destroyers Gremyashchy and Sokrushitelny, the British minesweepers HMS Gossamer, Harrier, Hussar and Niger, the Soviet guard ship Rubin and a tug. The German flotilla found Edinburgh 250 nmi (460 km; 290 mi) east of the convoy at 6:17 a.m. on 2 May, moving at 2 kn (3.7 km/h; 2.3 mph). Edinburgh was escorted by Foresight, Forester, the four British minesweepers and Rubin. Gremyaschi and Sokrushitelny had returned to Murmansk due to a lack of fuel. For most of 30 April, there had been discussion between the Admiral Nordmeer, Marine Group Command North and the Seekriegsleitung (SLK, the Naval War Staff) whether the destroyers should attack Convoy QP 11, Edinburgh (whose guns might still be operational) or Convoy PQ 15. The three German destroyers engaged the British ships; Edinburgh was unable to manoeuvre and could only steam in circles. A snow shower separated Herman Schoemann from the other German destroyers and it attacked the British ships alone.

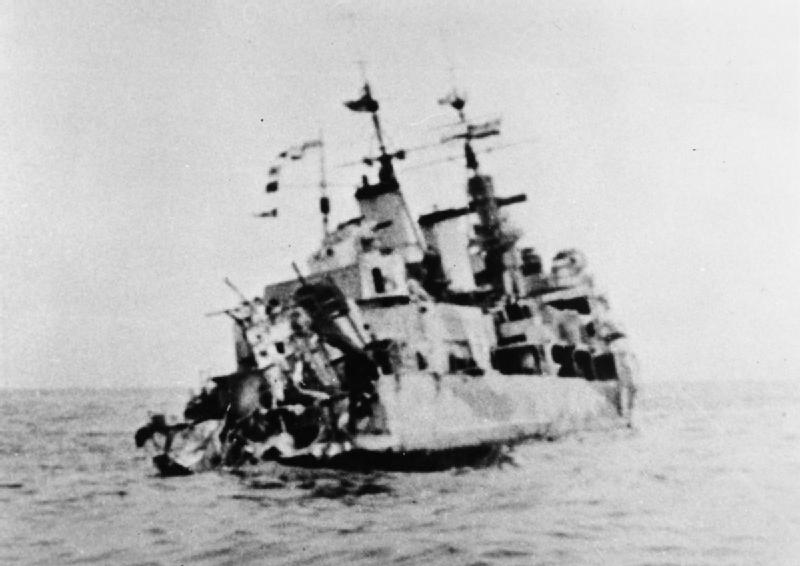
HMS Edinburgh after being torpedoed by U-456

On Edinburgh the gun laying equipment had been destroyed by the torpedo explosions but its gunners managed to hit and severely damage Hermann Schoemann with their second salvo. At 6:45 a.m., Z24 and Z25 arrived. Z25 hit and disabled Forester and then badly damaged Foresight. At 6:52 a.m. a salvo of torpedoes from one of the German destroyers missed Foresight and Forester but one of the torpedoes kept going and struck Edinburgh in the middle of the port side, opposite the hole made by U-456. The German ships soon withdrew, possibly because they had identified the British minesweepers as destroyers. At 8:15 a.m., Z24 rescued most of the crew of Hermann Schoemann who were still on the deck and then scuttled it. More survivors from Hermann Schoemann, in life rafts, were rescued later by U-88. Harrier and Gossamer took survivors off Edinburgh, which was then scuttled by a torpedo from Foresight.

=== 1 May ===
==== Action off Bear Island ====
Schmundt ordered a destroyer sortie led by Kapitän zur See Alfred Schulze-Hinrichs with the three destroyers of Zerstörergruppe Arktis (Destroyer Group Arctic) Z7 Hermann Schoemann, Z24 and Z25 to attack the convoy and HMS Edinburgh. The convoy had turned west late on 29 April and begun sailing parallel to the Polar ice, coming within 80 nmi (150 km; 92 mi) south-east of Bear Island by 5:40 a.m. As dawn began to break, six Ju 88s attacked from the south, Snowflake turned towards the bombers and opened fire, as did the other ships as the first torpedo-bomber attack on an Arctic convoy began. The Ju 88s dropped their torpedoes too soon and all missed. During the attack, Huff-Duff detected a U-boat and Amazon turned about, forcing it to submerge. Making 8 kn (15 km/h; 9.2 mph), at 7:15 a.m. the convoy turned to avoid a U-boat and at 8:40 a.m. diverted to the north-west away from another U-boat, coming close to the Polar ice. A bitter cold northerly wind blowing snowfalls led to the visibility varying between 2 and 10 nmi (3.7 and 18.5 km; 2.3 and 11.5 mi). The escorts kept close to deny U-boats nearby a gap to get at the merchant ships. At 1:45 p.m. the radar operators on Snowflake detected three ships to the south and Beverley, forward on the port side the convoy spotted destroyers to the south-west. Maxwell Richmond, the Senior Officer escort, followed the procedure discussed at the convoy conference ordering the destroyers to form on Bulldog and to lay a smokescreen.

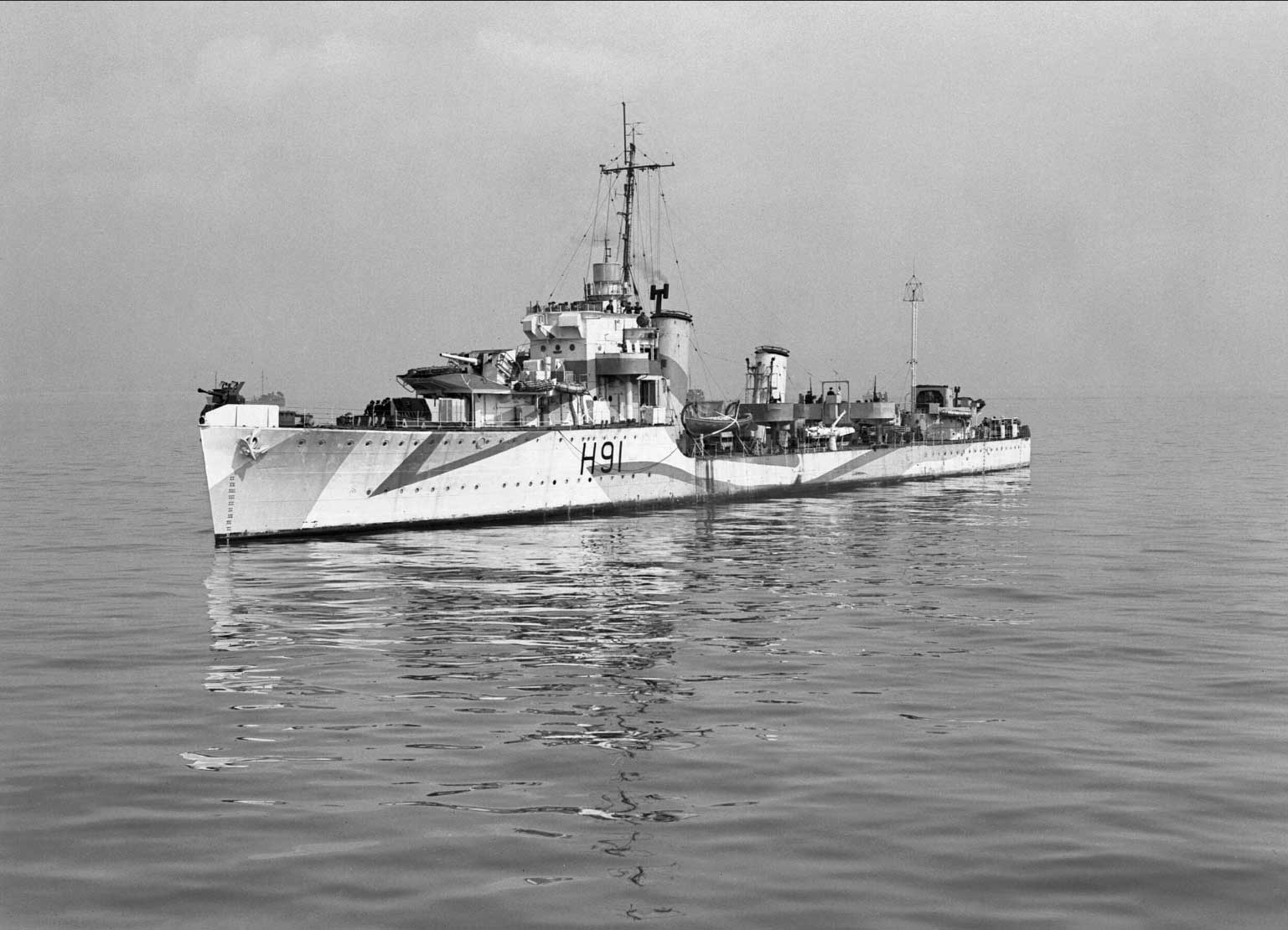
Photograph of HMS Bulldog taken in 1944

The convoy conducted an emergency turn to starboard and dropped smoke floats, the corvettes and Lord Middleton keeping close to the ships and also making smoke. In the coldness of the Arctic air, the smoke hung low on the sea, blocking the view. A U-boat sighting led the convoy to tighten the starboard turn that was achieved despite the difficulty of seeing the ships that were coming into line ahead because of the turns. The convoy entered the ice edge as the destroyers engaged the German flotilla. Hermann Schoemann carried five 12.7 cm SK C/34 naval guns, Z24 and Z25 each had five 15 cm TbtsK C/36 naval guns. Beverley had three 4-inch guns, only two of which could be fired broadside and the other destroyers carried two 4.7-inch guns (the guns aft had been removed to carry more anti-U-boat equipment).

The British destroyers formed a line with Bulldog ahead, then Beagle, Amazon and Beverley. The German destroyers had closed to 5.5 nmi (10.2 km; 6.3 mi) bearing on the convoy and turning to starboard for their rearmost guns to bear as the British destroyers turned to port for the same reason and both opened fire and launched torpedoes at 2:07 p.m. and hit Amazon, damaging its, steering gear; at 2:10 p.m. the German destroyers turned away. The British destroyers turned towards the convoy as it picked its way through the drift ice and having U-boat alarms that did not materialise due to the ice and smoke, the anti-submarine escorts and the vigorous course changes of the merchant ships. A torpedo from the German destroyers or possibly a U-boat, hit Tsiolkovsky that had fallen behind, it sinking quickly, Lord Middleton being sent to rescue survivors. Three explosions had been heard and some might have been torpedoes exploding against ice floes.

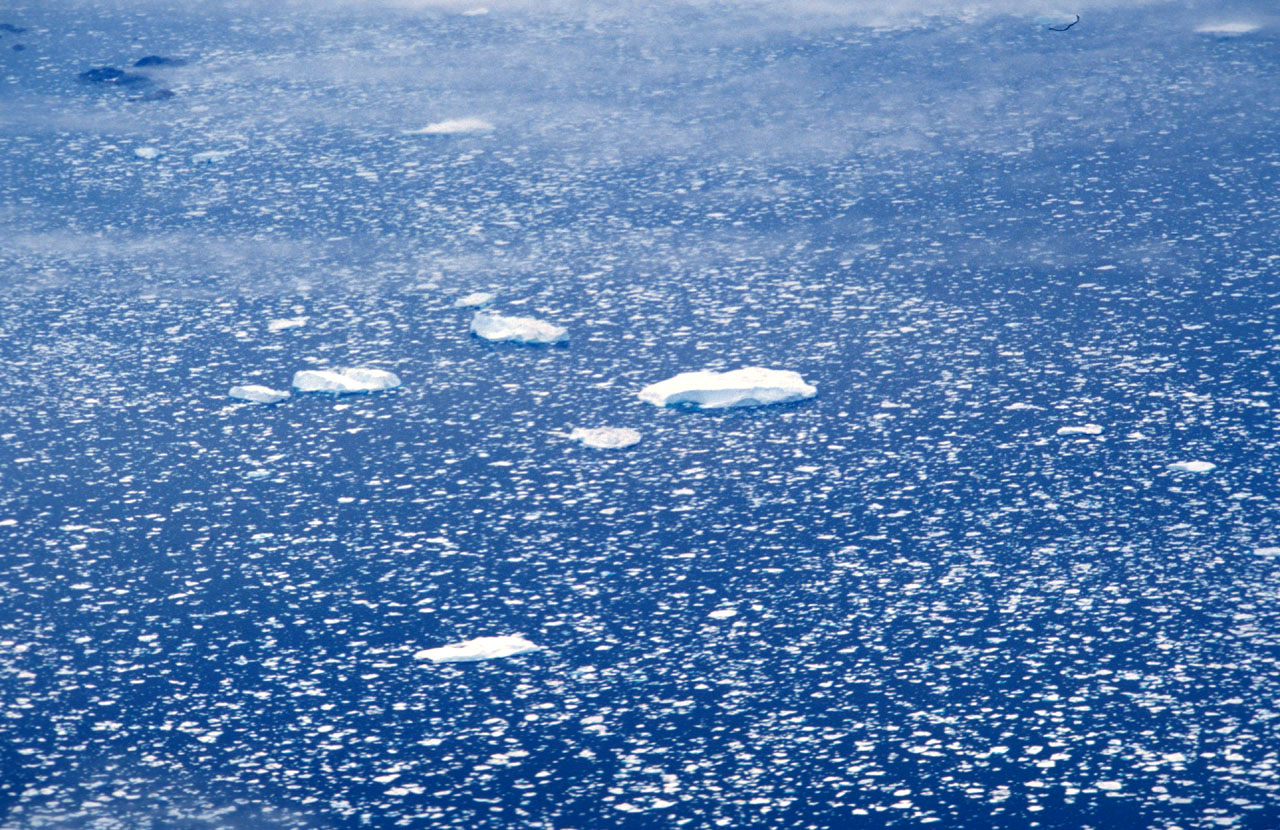
Photograph of drift ice off Greenland

The German destroyers made a second attack from the south-south-east and the British detected them at 8.5 nmi (15.7 km; 9.8 mi) the destroyers turned towards the German force, opening fire at 6.6 nmi (12.2 km; 7.6 mi) at 2:10 p.m. and this time the German destroyers turned away after five minutes and the British ships closed on the convoy where the Convoy Commodore, W. H. Lawrence reported that were waiting to attack the convoy when it left the drift ice. Richmond had to decide how to keep freedom of manoeuvre to counter another German probe, yet stay in contact with the convoy. If the German destroyers could pick off the British destroyers piecemeal, the convoy would be helpless. At 4:00 p.m. the German destroyers appeared again, this time from the east-south-east. Both sides opened fire at once, Bulldog was straddled and suffered splinter damage but after ten minutes, the German destroyers made smoke and turned away to the south.

The convoy was strung out for 7 nmi (13 km; 8.1 mi), the ships manoeuvring around the ice floes, helpless if the Germans could get round the destroyer escorts. Thirty minutes after disengaging, the German ships returned only to be detected by Snowflake at 12 nmi (22 km; 14 mi). The British destroyers formed line ahead again, opening fire at 4:58 p.m. and after exchanging fire for seven minutes the German ships made smoke and turned away. The Germans returned to the attack at 5:40 p.m., both sides managing to achieve several near-misses before the Germans turned away, pursued this time by the British, until the last German destroyer disappeared into the smoke. The British destroyers kept to the south-east of the convoy for three hours, before Richmond decided that the Germans had disengaged for good. As the destroyers rejoined the convoy, the last of the merchant ships were emerging from the ice floes. The two U-boats, thought to be waiting to attack the convoy, refrained from attacking once the destroyers returned and by 10:00 p.m. formation had been regained and the convoy was proceeding at 8.5 kn (15.7 km/h; 9.8 mph), Amazon still on emergency steering.

=== 2−7 May ===
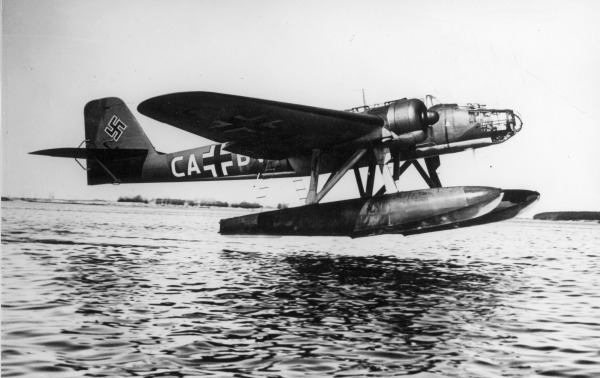
Example of a Heinkel He 115 seaplane

During the morning, the escorts depth-charged a U-boat contact. A Luftwaffe torpedo-bomber attacked some time later, missed but then circled overhead. Around mid-day the convoy crossed with Convoy PQ 15, both escort forces thwarting attacks by U-589 and U-251. Some time later a Heinkel He 115 seaplane circled the convoy but did not attack. Before noon on 3 April, Amazon and Beverley left the convoy to refuel and get the wounded to hospital. The cruisers London and Nigeria were spotted to the north and Beagle and Bulldog fired drifting mines. During the next day a Walrus amphibian came into sight and air escorts arrived overhead. Some of the escorts went to refuel and on 7 May, at 7:00 a.m. the remaining escorts detached for Hvalfjörður, the convoy terminated its voyage at Reykjavík.

== Aftermath ==
=== Analysis ===
In 1994, Richard Woodman wrote that Convoy QP 11 received the first torpedo-bomber attack by the Luftwaffe in the Arctic theatre. The defence of Convoy QP 11 by Maxwell Richmond and the destroyer escorts was all the more notable in that Forester, Foresight, with Gremyaschi and Sokrushitelny had detached on 30 April to attend Edinburgh. Bonham Carter took the view that until the long hours of darkness returned and the airfields at Banak and Bardufoss were neutralised, the convoys should be suspended. Aware of the political imperative to assist the Soviet Union and that his findings would be ignored, he told the Commander in Chief who, like the first Sea Lord also wanted to suspend convoys during the summer months,

We in the Navy are paid to do this job but it is beginning to ask too much of the men of the Merchant Navy.

It was still debatable what damage the Germans could inflict with better weather and longer hours of daylight but the vulnerability of the ships once they reached Murmansk was demonstrated on 15 April when Junkers Ju 87 dive-bombers attacked the port and damaged a submarine and a freighter.

In 2024, Andrew Boyd wrote that the German view of their operation was that it had obtained excellent results against the convoy, sinking five ships (instead of the one that really had been sunk) Edinburgh and damaging two destroyers, that in exchange for the loss of Hermann Shoemann was worth it.

Boyd wrote that with the German resources being expended against the Arctic convoys, an 8 per cent loss for the Convoy QP 11 was not severe, compared to Atlantic and Mediterranean convoys with similar opposition. The British could feel relief that the destroyer escorts for the convoy had prevented the German destroyers from destroying the convoy and because the ships assisting Edinburgh had got away, when Bonham Carter expected them to be doomed. The losses on the Arctic route had not strained Allied shipping resources too much but the escorts suffered the loss of a cruiser and its cargo gold, sufficient to pay for another cruiser, that was not recovered until 1981. Severe damage had been inflicted on four destroyers and HMS Punjabi had been lost accidentally, being run down by HMS King George V.

Hitherto, Arctic convoys usually had a cruiser to confront the German destroyers based at Kirkenes. The cruiser was independent of the close escort and had considerable freedom of manoeuvre when a convoy was east of Bear Island, scouting at a distance from the convoy and causing uncertainty to the Germans The independence was balanced by vulnerability, speed and zig-zagging not making a cruiser safe from U-boat attack. Edinburgh had sped ahead of the convoy to surprise U-boats detected by Huff-Duff to exploit its radar and depth charges but this could have been done by a destroyer.

=== Strategic assessments ===
==== German ====
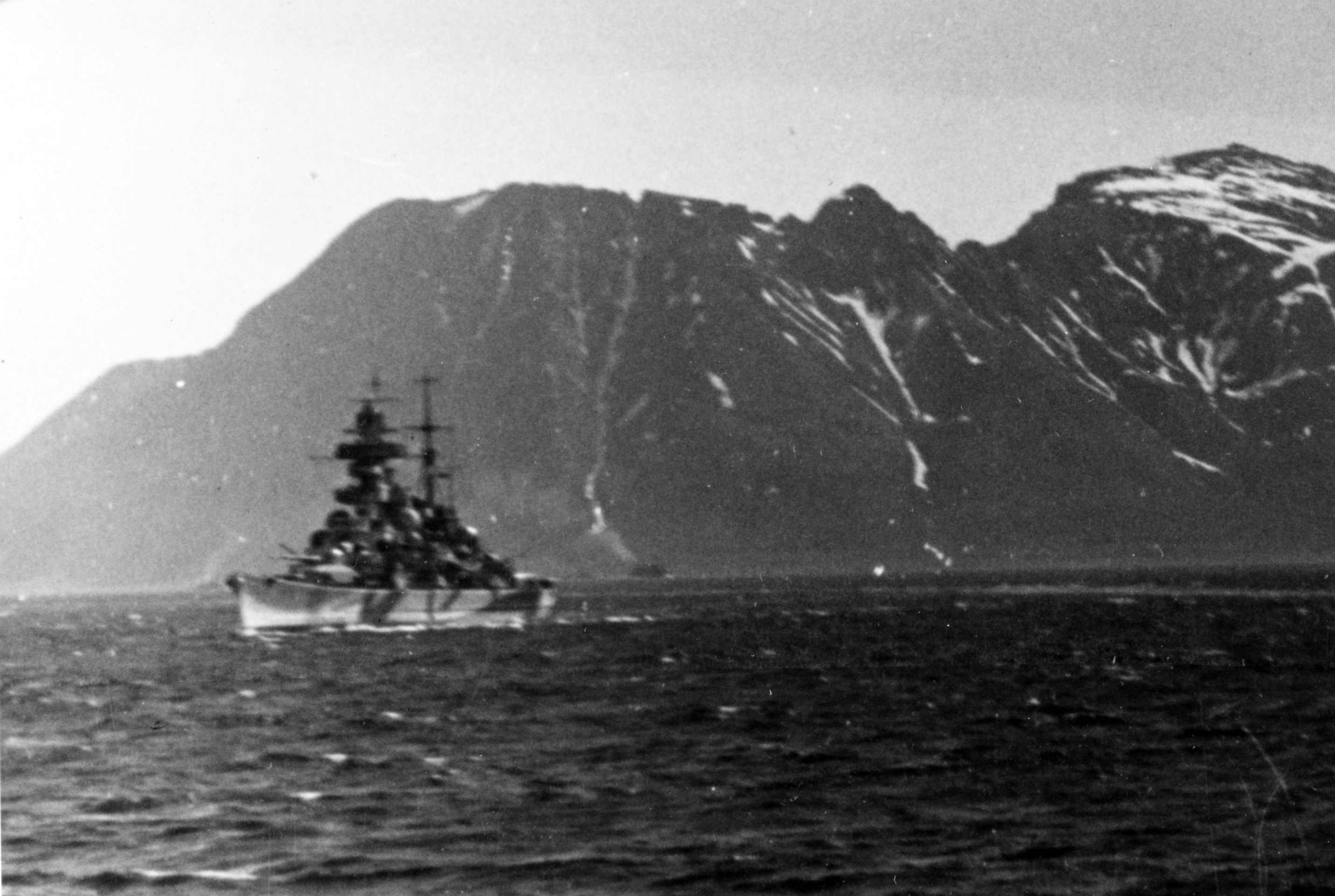
Admiral Hipper in Norway

On 12 May, SKL judged that the British and Americans were well aware of the importance of shipments to the Soviet Union, when the second German attempt to knock the USSR out of the war was due. Intelligence reports referred to much bigger convoys, along with raids and a landing in northern Norway to stop the German forces there from intervening, raids being the more likely threat. From the start of May the big ships that could sortie against a convoy comprised the battleship Tirpitz, the heavy cruisers Admiral Scheer and Admiral Hipper with six destroyers and six torpedo boats (small destroyers). The heavy cruiser Lützow was due at Trondheim in mid-May and the last ten destroyers of the Kriegsmarine would be ready for Norway in June. On 9 May, Admiral Scheer transferred from Trondheim to Narvik, closer to the convoy route, as did Schmundt with Z34 and Z35 to be followed by Lützow and another two destroyers.

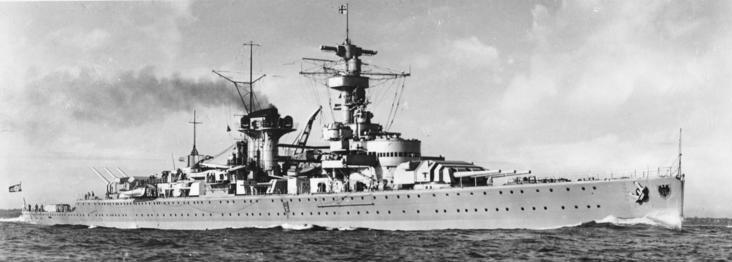
Panzerschiff Lützow at sea

As SKL prepared to for more ambitious use of its ships, the tactical limits it imposed, led to some bemusement amongst the senior officers. Less was expected the U-boat force, because night attacks, so successful in the Atlantic, were impossible in the long daylight hours of the midnight sun when it was difficult to stalk convoys and to evade attacks from escorts liable to emerge suddenly from patches of fog and rain. Until August, SKL anticipated only "minor and purely accidental" success and so it would be futile to reinforce the Artic U-boats. As usual, Rear-Admiral Karl Dönitz, the Befehlshaber der U-Boote, wanted the U-boats back in the Atlantic and equally predictably, SKL took the view that even rare sinkings were worth the diversion of U-boats to the Arctic. In the ten months to the end of April 1942, 32 U-boats operated in the Arctic, when 27 Arctic convoys of 309 ships had been run and two U-boats sunk for the loss of six ships. In north American waters, from January 1942, 25 boats had sunk 336 ships of 1.8 million GRT.

==== British ====
On 29 April, Oliver Lyttleton, the Minister of Production since 12 March, presented a review of the Arctic convoys. The review concluded that the Soviet Union would face the main German effort of 1942 and that Britain must guard against the USSR making a separate peace by making a maximum effort to deliver military equipment. Britain must choose between a Second Front in 1942 or send as much assistance to the Soviet Union, even if this was detrimental to the war economy. Britain should send its most potent weapons and ensure that they were delivered before the German summer offensive began, that a diminution of deliveries could affect the morale of the industrial workforce in Britain. The last conclusion was that the only way to get British-made tanks into action was through the Red Army (ignoring North Africa and the Far East) and that more tanks mattered more than more aircraft.

The document was rare in its emphasis the relationship between operations on the continent and support for Russia. Despite the significance of this point, discussion concentrated on whether to cut First Protocol April and May aircraft exports by 40 per cent and how to send 50 per cent more tanks and aircraft for the first half of the Second Protocol, due to begin on 1 July. Aircraft deliveries were already 136 short but crises in North Africa and the Far East could not be ignored. The danger of the looming second German attempt to defeat the USSR meant that it was most important that the First Protocol be met. The Air Ministry should meet the shortage by other means than cutting the supply of aircraft to Russia and Lyttleton thought that British tank production would fund a 50% increase in exports to the USSR and that this would placate the Russians for not increasing the number aircraft supplied but a decision was postponed. The Second Protocol (1 July 1942 to 1 July 1943) requirements from the Russians were for about 10.5 million tons of supplies, with 8.3 million tons coming from the US.

The American authorities calculated that the Russians could only import about 3 million tons in Arctic convoys. The Admiralty considered that no more than 25 ships could be escorted in one convoy and that only three convoys could be run in eight weeks. Even if some British commitments could be met by the US the British would need 10 per cent more ships and that the prospect for a big increase in Arctic deliveries above the 320,000 long tons (330,000 t) delivered offered no certainty that Soviet port facilities could handle three million tons. Ships had been carrying an average of 3,000 long tons (3,000 t) and US assumptions were based on double this and the burden of protecting Arctic and Persian Gulf convoys carrying mainly US supplies would fall on the Royal Navy, against the increasing intensity of German counter-operations, Arctic convoys had three times the number of anti-submarine escorts than comparable Atlantic convoys. The loss of Trinidad concentrated minds in the British government and Admiralty about the feasibility of convoys during the summer months. With the loss of HMS Fiji during the Battle of Crete in 1941, it was clear that even fast, manoeuvrable and well-armed warships were doomed, in waters where the Germans had air supremacy. The decision to send Convoy PQ 16 with 35 ships was taken on 20 May.

==== Soviet ====
Josef Stalin was influenced by reports from Admiral Arseny Golovko and the Soviet Naval Command that inflated the achievements of the Navy in the far north, Golovko claiming that in the first year of the war, 135 ships of 583,000 GRT had been sunk and 412 aircraft shot down. The real figures were 28 ships of around 40,000 GRT; two U-boats being sunk before the end of the war, of 44 U-boats sunk in the Arctic, 38 were due to the British. About ten per cent of the claim for aircraft was realistic, Luftflotte V not having anything like that many aircraft until mid-1942. On 5 May, Rear-Admiral Geoffrey Miles, the leader of the British Military Mission to Russia, reported that Soviet naval personnel were young, disciplined and determined fighters but had no naval tradition and a top-down command structure that stifled initiative and sneered at advice from Allied navies. During operations spectaculars were preferred to useful sailing, convoy escort being looked down on. Seamanship and navigation were poor and naval weapons were only effective in good weather. Ships spent too much time in harbour and destroyers neglected to refuel on return to base, readiness being a matter of little interest.

=== Casualties ===
Approximately 27 members of MV Tsiolkovsky were killed when it was sunk, 58 men of Edinburgh were killed and the crew of Hermann Schoemann suffered eight men killed and 45 wounded.

=== Subsequent operations ===
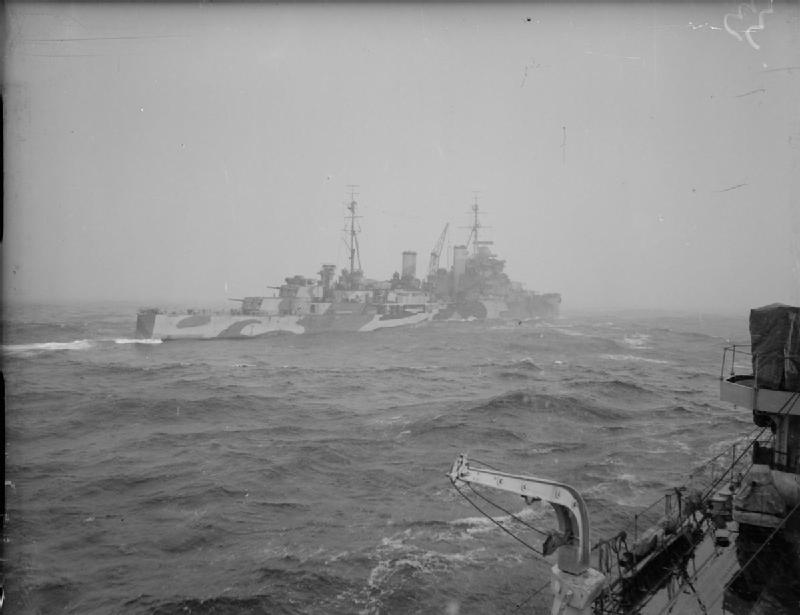
Photograph of HMS Trinidad taken in 1942 off Iceland

The cruiser HMS Trinidad, having been torpedoed on 29 March, supporting Convoy PQ 13, received running repairs at Murmansk and sailed on 13 May. Only the aft boiler room was working but Trinidad managed to reach 20 kn (37 km/h; 23 mph). The ship was bound for Iceland and then to the United States for permanent repairs. The cruiser was escorted by the destroyers Foresight and Forester also having undergone repairs after being damaged during Convoy QP 11, along with Matchless and Somali. To the west of Bear Island, the cruisers HMS Nigeria, Kent, Liverpool and Norfolk with the destroyers HMS Escapade, Icarus, Inglefield and Onslow waited in support.

The battleship HMS Duke of York, the aircraft carrier HMS Victorious, the cruisers USS Tuscaloosa and Washington and eleven destroyers of the Home Fleet cruised much further to the south-west. Air support from the VVS was lacking, only three Hurricanes of the promised six appeared and none of the Petlyakov Pe-3s. Luftwaffe aircraft found the ships on 14 May about 100 nmi (190 km; 120 mi) offshore and several began circling, homing aircraft and U-boats and at 11;00 a.m. a U-boat was spotted further north amidst ice-floes that led to the British ships turning westwards.

In Norway, Major Erich Bloedorn prepared the Ju 88 dive-bombers of KG 30 based at Banak and the Heinkel 111 (He 111) torpedo-bombers of I./Kampfgeschwader 26 (KG 26) were readied by the commander, Colonel Ernst-August Roth at Bardufoss. Towards sunset, with a breeze and a flat sea, mist patches made the perception of distance difficult. After night fell, the cooks on the British ships prepared hot food and then went back to action stations. Another U-boat was seen to the north and one to the east and at 9:00 p.m. the radar on Trinidad detected waves of aircraft coming from the south and south east at 15, 30 and 40 nmi (28, 56 and 74 km; 17, 35 and 46 mi) with another wave at 60 nmi (110 km; 69 mi) that created a great deal of apprehension among the survivors of merchant ships, those of Edinburgh and the Polish submarine ORP Jastrząb.

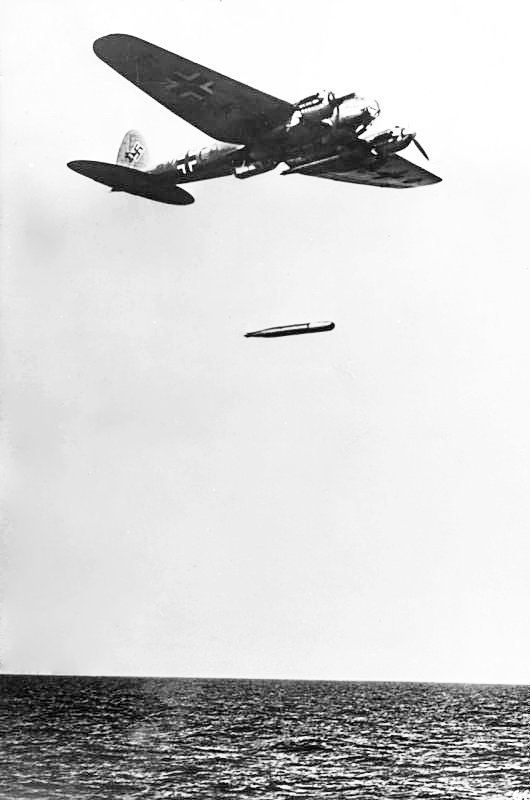
Heinkel He 111 torpedo-bomber

At 10:00 p.m. Ju 88s of KG 30 emerged from cloud cover and dive-bombed the ships, pulling out of their dives at what looked like recklessly low altitudes. The ships replied with a mass of anti-aircraft fire and none of the bombs stuck a ship, near misses sending seawater and bomb-splinters across their decks. The guns on Trinidad fired under local control and the captain junked to left and right, its temporary repairs creaking. The He 111 torpedo-bombers arrived at 10:37 p.m. and the gunners changed target to engage them, disrupting their attack. The bombers tried again but the barrage was so intense that the attack was not pressed. Not long after, a Ju 88 dived out of cloud and dropped four bombs; the starboard pom-poms hit the He 111 and shot it down in flames.

Trinidad was turning to port to comb the tracks of three torpedoes. A near-miss blew off the plates welded to the hull at Murmansk and flooded the area under B turret, another bomb exploded inside the hull and tore open the hull on the port side, starting a fire. The other two bombs exploded ahead of the ship and splinters penetrated the hull and let in more water, the bow settling. Trinidad still managed 20 kn (37 km/h; 23 mph) and although the He 111 torpedo-bombers tried to hit Trinidad again, the anti-aircraft fire from the cruiser and its destroyers kept them off and at 11:30 p.m. the bombers began to depart, enabling the cruiser to reduce speed, which was fanning the flames. The admiral, Bonham Carter and the captain, Leslie Saunders, agreed that the ship could not be saved and Matchless the destroyers took turns to take off the survivors.

A He 111 came upon the scene, attacked at wave-top height and a gun crew still on board, laid the gun by hand, hit the bomber that curved away and crashed into the sea, cheered by the crews. Matchless fired three torpedoes into Trinidad, sinking it at 1:20 a.m. on 15 May. The destroyers headed north, their speed reduced because of the damaged condition of Forester and Foresight. Another attack by Ju 88s caused splinter-damage before they turned away and hearts fell when the superstructures of big ships was seen on the horizon. Somali accelerated towards them but they turned out to be the cruisers Kent, Liverpool, Nigeria and Norfolk. Before sailing out of danger, the destroyers had a U-boat alarm and another attack by Ju 88s, 350 nmi (650 km; 400 mi) from Norway, to no effect. The destroyers fuelled at Seyðisfjörður in Iceland then sailed to Scapa Flow to land the wounded.

== Allied order of battle ==
=== Convoyed ships ===
Merchant ships
Ship	Year	Flag	GRT	Notes
MV Atheltemplar	1930	Merchant Navy	8,939	
SS Ballot	1922	Panama	6,131	
SS Briarwood	1930	Merchant Navy	4,019	Convoy Commodore
SS Dan-Y-Bryn	1940	Merchant Navy	5,117	Vice-convoy Commodore
SS Dunboyne	1919	United States	3,515	
SS El Estero	1920	Panama	4,219	
SS Eldena	1919	United States	6,900	
SS Gallant Fox	1918	Panama	5,473	
SS Mormacmar	1920	United States	5,453	
SS Stone Street	1922	Panama	6,131	
SS Trehata	1928	Merchant Navy	4,817	Damaged by ice
SS Tsiolkovsky	1935	Soviet Union	2,847	Sunk 1 May by Z24, Z25, up to c. 27†
SS West Cheswald	1919	United States	5,711	

=== Escorts ===
Escort forces
Ship	Flag	Type	Notes
Eastern local escort
Gremyaschi	Soviet Navy	Gnevny-class destroyer	28–29 April
Sokrushitelny	Soviet Navy	Gnevny-class destroyer	28–29 April
HMS Gossamer	Royal Navy	Halcyon-class minesweeper	28–29 April
HMS Hussar	Royal Navy	Halcyon-class minesweeper	28–29 April
HMS Niger	Royal Navy	Halcyon-class minesweeper	28–29 April
Submarine flank cover
ORP Jastrząb	Polish Navy	S-class submarine	
Minerve	Free French Naval Forces	Minerve-class submarine	
HMS Unison	Royal Navy	U-class submarine	
HNoMS Uredd	Royal Norwegian Navy	U-class submarine	
D-3	Soviet Navy	Dekabrist-class submarine	
K-2	Soviet Navy	Soviet K-class submarine	
K-22	Soviet Navy	Soviet K-class submarine	
K-23	Soviet Navy	Soviet K-class submarine	
Ocean escort
HMS Edinburgh	Royal Navy	Town-class cruiser	28 April – 7 May
HMS Amazon	Royal Navy	Thornycroft type destroyer	28 April – 7 May
HMS Beagle	Royal Navy	B-class destroyer	28 April – 7 May
HMS Bulldog	Royal Navy	B-class destroyer	28 April – 7 May
HMS Beverley	Royal Navy	Clemson-class destroyer	28 April – 7 May
HMS Foresight	Royal Navy	F-class destroyer	28 April – 30 April
HMS Forester	Royal Navy	F-class destroyer	28 April – 30 April
HMS Campanula	Royal Navy	Flower-class corvette	28 April – 7 May
HMS Oxlip	Royal Navy	Flower-class corvette	28 April – 7 May
HMS Saxifrage	Royal Navy	Flower-class corvette	28 April – 7 May
HMS Snowflake	Royal Navy	Flower-class corvette	28 April – 7 May
HMT Lord Middleton	Royal Navy	Admiralty trawler	28 April – 7 May
Distant cover (Home Fleet)
HMS Victorious	Royal Navy	Illustrious-class aircraft carrier	28 April – 7 May
HMS King George V	Royal Navy	King George V-class battleship	28 April – 7 May
HMS Duke of York	Royal Navy	King George V-class battleship	28 April – 7 May
HMS Kenya	Royal Navy	Fiji-class cruiser	28 April – 7 May
HMS Escapade	Royal Navy	E-class destroyer	28 April – 7 May
HMS Faulknor	Royal Navy	F-class destroyer	28 April – 7 May
HMS Inglefield	Royal Navy	I-class destroyer	28 April – 7 May
HMS Marne	Royal Navy	M-class destroyer	28 April – 7 May
HMS Martin	Royal Navy	M-class destroyer	28 April – 7 May
HMS Oribi	Royal Navy	O-class destroyer	28 April – 7 May
HMS Belvoir	Royal Navy	Hunt-class destroyer	28 April – 7 May
HMS Hursley	Royal Navy	Hunt-class destroyer	28 April – 7 May
HMS Lamerton	Royal Navy	Hunt-class destroyer	28 April – 7 May
HMS Middleton	Royal Navy	Hunt-class destroyer	28 April – 7 May
Edinburgh rescue force
HMS Foresight	Royal Navy	F-class destroyer	
HMS Forester	Royal Navy	F-class destroyer	
Gremyaschy	Soviet Navy	Gnevny-class destroyer	
Sokrushitelny	Soviet Navy	Gnevny-class destroyer	
HMS Gossamer	Royal Navy	Halcyon-class minesweeper	
Harrier	Royal Navy	Halcyon-class minesweeper	
Hussar	Royal Navy	Halcyon-class minesweeper	
Niger	Royal Navy	Halcyon-class minesweeper	
Rubin	Soviet Navy	Project 43-class guardship	Soviet Coastal Patrol
Tug	Soviet Navy	—	

== German order of battle ==
=== Kriegsmarine ===
U-boats
Boat	Captain	Flag	Type	Notes
gruppe Strauchritter
U-88	Heino Bohmann	Kriegsmarine	Type VIIC submarine	
U-251	Heinrich Timm	Kriegsmarine	Type VIIC submarine	
U-405	Rolf-Heinrich Hopman	Kriegsmarine	Type VIIC submarine	
U-436	Günther Seibicke	Kriegsmarine	Type VIIC submarine	
U-456	Max-Martin Teichert	Kriegsmarine	Type VIIC submarine	29 April, torpedoed HMS Edinburgh
U-589	Hans-Joachim Horrer	Kriegsmarine	Type VIIC submarine	
U-703	Heinz Bielfeld	Kriegsmarine	Type VIIC submarine	

=== Ships ===
German destroyers
Ship	Flag	Class	Notes
Z7 Hermann Schoemann	Kriegsmarine	Type 1934A-class destroyer	1 May, severely damaged by HMS Edinburgh, scuttled
Z24	Kriegsmarine	Type 1936A-class destroyer	1 April, Z24/Z25 torpedoed HMS Edinburgh
Z25	Kriegsmarine	Type 1936A-class destroyer	1 April, Z24/Z25 torpedoed HMS Edinburgh

== Loss of Trinidad ==
=== Allied ships ===
British flotilla
Ship	Flag	Class	Notes
Trinidad and escorts
HMS Trinidad	Royal Navy	Fiji-class cruiser	
HMS Somali	Royal Navy	Tribal-class destroyer	
HMS Foresight	Royal Navy	F-class destroyer	
HMS Forester	Royal Navy	F-class destroyer	
HMS Matchless	Royal Navy	M-class destroyer	
Home Fleet cruiser detachment
HMS Kent	Royal Navy	County-class cruiser	
HMS Norfolk	Royal Navy	County-class cruiser	
HMS Nigeria	Royal Navy	Fiji-class cruiser	
HMS Liverpool	Royal Navy	Town-class cruiser	
HMS Escapade	Royal Navy	E-class destroyer	
HMS Icarus	Royal Navy	I-class destroyer	
HMS Inglefield	Royal Navy	I-class destroyer	
HMS Onslow	Royal Navy	O-class destroyer	

=== Luftflotte 5 ===
Anti-shipping aircraft
Unit	Flag	Type	Notes
I./Kampfgeschwader 26	Luftwaffe	Heinkel He 111 H6	Torpedo-bomber, 2 LT F5b torpedoes
Kampfgeschwader 30	Luftwaffe	Junkers Ju 88	Bomber/dive-bomber

== Bibliography ==
- Allen, Tony (2020). "MV Tsiolkovsky". Wrecksite.eu.
- Boog, H.; Rahn, W.; Stumpf, R.; Wegner, B. (2001). The Global War: Widening of the Conflict into a World War and the Shift of the Initiative 1941–1943. Germany in the Second World War. Vol. VI. Translated by Osers, E.; Brownjohn, J.; Crampton, P.; Willmot, L. (Eng trans. Oxford University Press, London ed.). Potsdam: Militärgeschichtliches Forschungsamt (Research Institute for Military History). ISBN 0-19-822888-0.
  - Rahn, W. "Part III. The War at Sea in the Atlantic and in the Arctic Ocean III. The Conduct of the War in the Atlantic and the Coastal Area (b) The Third Phase, April–December 1941: The Extension of the Areas of Operations". In Boog et al. (2001).
- Boyd, Andrew (2024). Arms for Russia & the Naval War in the Arctic 1941–1945. Barnsley: Seaforth (Pen & Sword). ISBN 978-1-3990-3886-7.
- Brown, David (1995) [1990]. Warship Losses of World War Two (2nd rev. ed.). London: Arms and Armour Press. ISBN 1-85409-278-2.
- Claasen, A. R. A. (2001). Hitler's Northern War: The Luftwaffe's Ill-fated Campaign, 1940–1945. Lawrence, KS: University Press of Kansas. ISBN 0-7006-1050-2.
- Edwards, Bernard (2002). The Road to Russia: Arctic Convoys 1942. Annapolis, Maryland: Naval Institute Press. ISBN 1-59114-732-8 – via Archive Foundation.
- Hancock, W. K.; Gowing, M. M. (1949). Hancock, W. K. (ed.). British War Economy. History of the Second World War, United Kingdom Civil Series. London: HMSO. OCLC 630191560.
- Hinsley, F. H. (1994) [1993]. British Intelligence in the Second World War: Its Influence on Strategy and Operations. History of the Second World War, United Kingdom Military Series (2nd rev. abr. ed.). London: HMSO. ISBN 978-0-11-630961-7.
- Jessop, Keith; Hanson, Neil (2002). Goldfinder. Danvers, MA: John Wiley and Sons. ISBN 0-471-40733-X – via Archive Foundation.
- Jordan, Roger W. (2006) [1999]. The World's Merchant Fleets 1939: The Particulars and Wartime Fates of 6,000 Ships (2nd ed.). London: Chatham/Lionel Leventhal. ISBN 978-1-86176-293-1.
- Kahn, D. (1973) [1967]. The Codebreakers: The Story of Secret Writing (10th abr. Signet, Chicago ed.). New York: Macmillan. LCCN 63-16109. OCLC 78083316.
- Macksey, K. (2004) [2003]. The Searchers: Radio Intercept in two World Wars (Cassell Military Paperbacks ed.). London: Cassell. ISBN 978-0-304-36651-4.
- O'Hara, Vincent P. (2011). Tucker, Spencer C. (ed.). World War II at Sea: An Encyclopedia. Santa Barbara, CA: ABC-CLIO. ISBN 978-1-59884-457-3.
- Paterson, Lawrence (2016). Steel and Ice: The U-boat Battle in the Arctic and Black Sea 1941–45. Stroud: The History Press. ISBN 978-1-59114-258-4.
- Rohwer, Jürgen; Hümmelchen, Gerhard (2005) [1972]. Chronology of the War at Sea, 1939–1945: The Naval History of World War Two (3rd rev. ed.). London: Chatham. ISBN 978-1-86176-257-3.
- Ruegg, R.; Hague, A. (1993) [1992]. Convoys to Russia: Allied Convoys and Naval Surface Operations in Arctic Waters 1941–1945 (2nd rev. enl. ed.). Kendal: World Ship Society. ISBN 0-905617-66-5.
- Roskill, S. W. (1957) [1954]. Butler, J. R. M. (ed.). The War at Sea 1939–1945: The Defensive. History of the Second World War United Kingdom Military Series. Vol. I (4th impr. ed.). London: HMSO. OCLC 881709135. Archived from the original on 27 February 2022.
- Smith, William (2023). Allied Convoys to Northern Russia 1841–1945. Barnsley: Pen & Sword Maritime. ISBN 978-1-39905-473-7.
- Whitley, M. J. (1991). German Destroyers of World War Two. Annapolis, MD: Naval Institute Press. ISBN 978-1-55750-302-2.
- Woodman, Richard (1994). Arctic Convoys 1941–1945 (hbk. ed.). London: John Murray. ISBN 0-7195-5079-3.
- Woodman, Richard (2004) [1994]. Arctic Convoys 1941–1945. London: John Murray. ISBN 978-0-7195-5752-1.
- Ziemke, Earl F. (1959). The German Northern Theatre of Operations, 1940–1945. Washington, DC: Headquarters, United States Department of the Army. OCLC 610363660. 20-271.
