= HMS Forester (H74) =

Destroyer

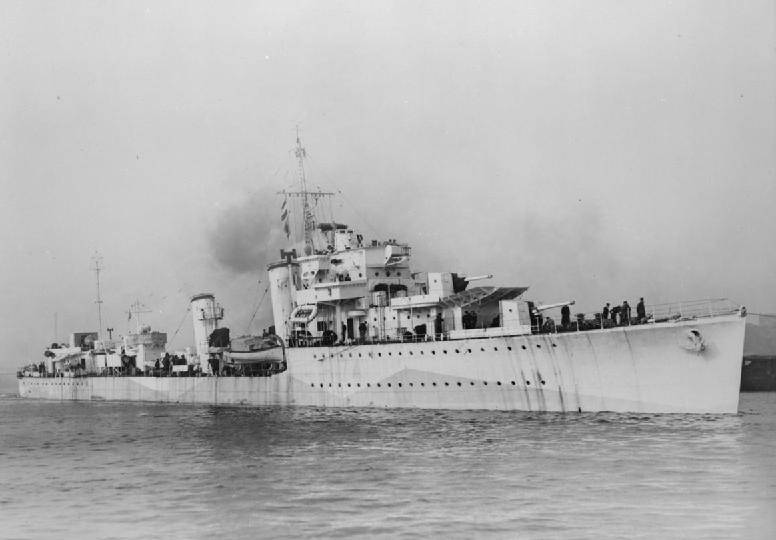
- Forester in 1942

History

United Kingdom
- Name: Forester
- Builder: J. Samuel White, Cowes
- Laid down: 15 May 1933
- Launched: 28 June 1934
- Completed: 19 April 1935
- Commissioned: 29 March 1935
- Decommissioned: September 1945
- Identification: Pennant number: H74
- Fate: Sold for scrap, January 1946

General characteristics (as built)
- Class & type: F-class destroyer
- Displacement: 1,405 long tons (1,428 t) (standard)
- Length: 329 ft (100.3 m) o/a
- Beam: 33 ft 3 in (10.13 m)
- Draught: 12 ft 6 in (3.81 m) (deep)
- Installed power: 3 × Admiralty 3-drum boilers; 36,000 shp (27,000 kW)
- Propulsion: 2 × shafts; 2 × geared steam turbines
- Speed: 35.5 knots (65.7 km/h; 40.9 mph)
- Range: 6,350 nmi (11,760 km; 7,310 mi) at 15 knots (28 km/h; 17 mph)
- Complement: 145
- Sensors & processing systems: ASDIC
- Armament: 4 × single 4.7 in (120 mm) guns; 2 × quadruple 0.5 in (12.7 mm) machine guns; 2 × quadruple 21 in (533 mm) torpedo tubes; 1 × rack, 2 × throwers for 20 depth charges

Service record
- Part of: 4th Destroyer Flotilla; 8th Destroyer Flotilla; 1st Canadian Escort Group; 115th Escort Group
- Operations: 2nd Battle of Narvik; Attack on Mers-el-Kébir; Malta Convoys; Battle of Cape Spartivento; Normandy landings
- Victories: U-27 (20 September 1939); U-138 (18 June 1941); U-845 (10 March 1944); U-413 (20 August 1944)

HMS Forester was one of nine F-class destroyers built for the Royal Navy during the early 1930s. Although assigned to the Home Fleet upon completion, the ship was attached to the Mediterranean Fleet in 1935–36 during the Abyssinia Crisis. A few weeks after the start of World War II in September 1939, she helped to sink one German submarine and then participated in the Second Battle of Narvik during the Norwegian Campaign of 1940. Forester was sent to Gibraltar in mid-1940 and formed part of Force H where she participated in the attack on the Vichy French ships at Mers-el-Kébir and the Battle of Dakar between escorting the aircraft carriers of Force H as they flew off aircraft for Malta and covering convoys resupplying and reinforcing the island until late 1941. During this time the ship helped to sink another German submarine.

Converted into an escort destroyer midway through the war, Forester was assigned to escort convoys to Russia for the next year and a half and then in the North Atlantic until mid-1944. The ship helped to sink another German submarine before she was transferred to the English Channel to protect convoys during the Normandy landings. Forester assisted in sinking a German submarine before returning to the North Atlantic for a few months. The ship was under repair for the first half of 1945 and was then reduced to reserve in November before being scrapped in early 1946.

== Description ==
The F-class ships were repeats of the preceding E class. They displaced 1,405 long tons (1,428 t) at standard load and 1,940 long tons (1,970 t) at deep load. The ships had an overall length of 329 feet (100.3 m), a beam of 33 feet 3 inches (10.1 m) and a draught of 12 feet 6 inches (3.8 m). They were powered by two Parsons geared steam turbines, each driving one propeller shaft, using steam provided by three Admiralty three-drum boilers. The turbines developed a total of 36,000 shaft horsepower (27,000 kW) and gave a maximum speed of 35.5 knots (65.7 km/h; 40.9 mph). Forester carried a maximum of 470 long tons (480 t) of fuel oil that gave her a range of 6,350 nautical miles (11,760 km; 7,310 mi) at 15 knots (28 km/h; 17 mph). The ships' complement was 145 officers and ratings.

The ships mounted four 4.7-inch (120 mm) Mark IX guns in single mounts, designated 'A', 'B', 'X', and 'Y' in sequence from front to rear. For anti-aircraft (AA) defence, they had two quadruple Mark I mounts for the 0.5 inch Vickers Mark III machine gun. The F class was fitted with two above-water quadruple torpedo tube mounts for 21-inch (533 mm) torpedoes. One depth charge rack and two throwers were fitted; 20 depth charges were originally carried, but this increased to 35 shortly after the war began.

=== Wartime modifications ===
Forester had her rear torpedo tubes replaced by a 12-pounder (76 mm) AA gun when she returned to England in October 1941. In April–June 1943, she was converted into an escort destroyer. A Type 286 short-range surface search radar was fitted and a Type 271 target indication radar was installed above the bridge, replacing the director-control tower and rangefinder. The ship also received a HF/DF radio direction finder mounted on a pole mainmast. Her short-range AA armament was augmented by four 20 mm (0.8 in) Oerlikon guns and the .50-calibre machine guns were replaced by a pair of Oerlikons. A split Hedgehog anti-submarine spigot mortar was installed abreast 'A' gun and stowage for a total of 70 depth charges meant that 'Y' gun and the 12-pounder had to be removed to compensate for their weight. By 1944 the ship carried 115 depth charges. (Note: Sources are often contradictory about when these changes were made. For example, a photograph in English, dated April 1943, clearly shows the ship with all four guns and no Hedgehog. But the account given in the Admiralty Historical Section of the battle against the three German destroyers, says that German shells disabled two of her three guns. Perhaps the photo is misdated and English is correct in stating that she was converted to an escort destroyer between November 1941 and April 1942.)

== Construction and career ==
Forester was built by J. Samuel White at its Cowes shipyard under the 1932 Naval Programme. The ship was laid down on 15 May 1933, launched on 28 June 1934, as the eleventh ship to carry the name, and completed on 19 April 1935. The ship cost 248,898 pounds, excluding Admiralty supplied equipment such as armaments and communications sets. Forester was initially assigned to the 6th Destroyer Flotilla (DF) of the Home Fleet, but was sent to reinforce the Mediterranean Fleet, together with most of her sister ships, during the Abyssinian crisis in June and remained here until February 1936. She was deployed to protect neutral shipping to the Bay of Biscay from April to September 1937, during the Spanish Civil War. On 6 April, she escorted the British-flagged freighter Jenny to Santander assisted by the heavy cruiser HMS Shropshire. On 27 April, Forester attempted to shepherd the British merchant Consett to Santander, but the cargo ship was shelled by the battleship España and forced out of the territorial waters. Forester accomplished the same mission off Gibraltar in September–October of the same year. The ship then returned home and spent the next two years with the 6th DF. The flotilla was renumbered the 8th Destroyer Flotilla in April 1939, five months before the start of World War II. Forester remained assigned to it until June 1940, escorting the larger ships of the fleet.

After a pair of fishing trawlers were sunk by a submarine off the Hebrides after the start of World War II in September 1939, the 6th and 8th DFs were ordered to sweep the area on 19 September. The following day, Forester and three of her sisters sank the German submarine U-27 and then resumed their normal escort duties. On 11 February 1940, she helped to tow the damaged tanker MV Imperial Transport to port after she was torpedoed by U-53. Two months later, Forester escorted the battleship Warspite during the Second Battle of Narvik on 13 April and engaged several German destroyers. Only lightly damaged herself, she escorted the badly damaged destroyer Cossack to Skjelfjord for temporary repairs after the battle. Two days later, Forester was one of the screen for the battleship Rodney and the battlecruiser Renown as they sailed back to Scapa Flow to refuel. In early June, the ship was escorting the battlecruiser Repulse and two cruisers as they searched for illusory German commerce raiders off Iceland; they were recalled to Norwegian waters on 9 June after the Germans launched Operation Juno, an attack on the Allied convoys evacuating Norway, but the Germans had already returned to base by the time the ships arrived.

=== Force H ===
In late June, the 8th DF was ordered to Gibraltar where they were to form the escorts for Force H. A few days later, they participated in the attack on Mers-el-Kébir against the Vichy French ships stationed there. During Operation MA 5, a planned air attack on Italian airfields in Sardinia, the destroyer Escort was torpedoed by the Italian submarine Guglielmo Marconi on 11 July after the attack had been cancelled due to lack of surprise. The torpedo blew a large hole in the ship, but the British tried to salvage her. Despite their efforts, she foundered later that morning after Forester and the flotilla leader Faulknor took off the survivors. A month later Forester was one of the escorts for Force H during Operation Hurry, a mission to fly off fighter aircraft for Malta and conduct an airstrike on Cagliari on 2 August. On 13 September, Force H rendezvoused with a convoy that was carrying troops intended to capture Dakar from the Vichy French. Ten days later, they attacked Dakar, but were driven off by the Vichy French defences. In early October, Forester escorted a troop convoy from Freetown, Sierra Leone, to French Cameroon.

She then returned to Gibraltar and escorted the aircraft carriers Argus and Ark Royal during Operations Coat and White in November. On 21 November, the light cruiser Despatch, Forester and Faulknor intercepted the Vichy French blockade runner MV Charles Plumier and escorted her to Gibraltar. The ship escorted Force F to Malta during Operation Collar later in the month and participated in the inconclusive Battle of Cape Spartivento on 27 November. In early January, she screened Force H during Operation Excess and rescued the crew of a shot-down Italian bomber on 9 January.

Later that month, Forester and Faulknor temporarily relieved some of the escorts for Convoy WS 5B bound for Egypt via the Cape of Good Hope and stayed with the convoy to Freetown. Before arriving there on 26 January, they were detached from Force H to reinforce the Freetown Escort Force. This did not last long as they were ordered to escort Convoy SL 67 and the battleship Malaya en route back to Gibraltar. On 7 March, the German battleships Gneisenau and Scharnhorst spotted the convoy, but Admiral Günther Lütjens declined to attack when Malaya was spotted. Their report caused attacks by two U-boats that sank five ships from the convoy before Force H rendezvoused with it three days later. The following month Forester was part of the escort screen, with five other destroyers, for the battleship Queen Elizabeth and the light cruisers Naiad, Fiji and Gloucester which were joining the Mediterranean Fleet. This was part of Operation Tiger which included a supply convoy taking tanks to Egypt and the transfer of warships to and from the Mediterranean Fleet. Forester and her sisters had their Two-Speed Destroyer Sweep (TSDS) minesweeping gear rigged to allow them to serve as a fast minesweepers en route to Malta. Despite this, one merchant ship was sunk by mines and another damaged. Later that month, she participated in Operation Splice, another mission in which the carriers Ark Royal and Furious flew off fighters for Malta.

Force H was ordered to join the escort of Convoy WS 8B in the North Atlantic on 24 May, after the Battle of the Denmark Strait on 23 May, but they were directed to search for the German battleship Bismarck and the heavy cruiser Prinz Eugen on 25 May. Heavy seas increased fuel consumption for all of the escorts and Forester was forced to return to Gibraltar to refuel later that day before rejoining the capital ships of Force H on 29 May, after Bismarck had been tracked down and sunk. In early June the destroyer participated in two more aircraft delivery missions to Malta (Operations Rocket and Tracer). While returning to Gibraltar to refuel, after covering another WS convoy west of Gibraltar, she participated in the sinking of U-138, together with four of her sisters on 18 June. In late June, Forester screened Ark Royal and Furious as they flew off more fighters for Malta in Operation Railway.

On 23 July, during a Malta supply convoy (Operation Substance), Forester rescued survivors from her sister Fearless, which had been attacked by Italian torpedo-bombers, and then sank the wrecked and burning ship with torpedoes. A week later she screened the capital ships of Force H as they covered another Malta convoy (Operation Style). Over the next several months, Forester participated in Operation Halberd, another Malta convoy and escorted Ark Royal and Furious as they made several trips to fly off aircraft for Malta (Operations Status, Status II and Callboy). Upon her return to the UK on 26 October, the destroyer was briefly assigned to the 11th Escort Group before rejoining the Home Fleet at Scapa Flow in November. She then began a lengthy refit and work up that lasted until April 1942.

=== Russian convoys, 1942 ===
In mid-April, Forester was part of the close cover for Convoy PQ 14 to Murmansk. On 28 April, Forester joined the escort of returning Convoy QP 11, and two days later, when the light cruiser Edinburgh was torpedoed, she and her sister Foresight were detached to escort the crippled cruiser back to Murmansk. On 1 May Edinburgh and her escorts were attacked by the German destroyers Z24, Z25 and Z7 Hermann Schoemann. Forester fired her torpedoes at Z25, but was almost simultaneously hit by three shells. They disabled 'B' and 'X' guns and the hit in No. 1 boiler room temporarily disabled her propulsion machinery. Twelve crewmen were killed, including her captain, and nine were wounded. Foresight was also temporarily disabled and the Germans put another torpedo into Edinburgh, crippling her, before breaking off the engagement to rescue the crew of the crippled Z7 Hermann Schoemann. The two British destroyers took off the survivors from the cruiser and Foresight scuttled the cruiser with a torpedo before heading back to Murmansk for temporary repairs. She sailed on 13 May with Foresight and the destroyers Somali and Matchless as escorts for the light cruiser Trinidad that had been damaged while escorting Convoy PQ 13. The next day the ships came under heavy air attack, and Trinidad was further damaged and set on fire. Forester took off the wounded and other survivors, and Trinidad was sunk by Matchless. Forester arrived at Scapa Flow on 18 May and immediately took passage to a shipyard on the Tyne for repairs that lasted until October. That month, she rejoined the 8th DF and resumed escorting convoys to Russia until April 1943. The ship was then refitted at Leith until June.

=== Later service, 1943–45 ===
In June 1943, Forester joined the 1st Canadian Escort Group for Atlantic convoy duty. On 10 March 1944, while escorting Convoy SC 154, Forester, along with the destroyer HMS Cygnet, the frigate HMCS Swansea and the corvette HMCS Owen Sound sank the U-845. The ship remained on convoy duty in the North Atlantic until 29 May when she was transferred to the English Channel to support the Normandy landings for the next several months. On 20 August, Forester, and the destroyers Wensleydale and Vidette sank the U-413 off Beachy Head. The next day she engaged and drove off E-boats with the destroyers Melbreak and Watchman while defending a Channel coastal convoy. In October, the ship was transferred to the 14th Escort Group at Londonderry Port for convoy defence. On 1 December 1944 Forester arrived at Liverpool for repairs, returning to service in May 1945, and joining the Rosyth Escort Force. Forester was paid off in August and reduced to reserve at Dartmouth on 2 November. She was turned over to the British Iron & Steel Corporation on 22 January 1946 for disposal and arrived at Rosyth to be broken up for scrap on 26 February by Metal Industries, Limited.

== Bibliography ==
- Admiralty Historical Section (2007). The Royal Navy and the Arctic Convoys. Naval Staff Histories. Abingdon, UK: Whitehall History in association with Routledge. ISBN 978-0-7146-5284-9.
- Alcofar Nassaes, José Luis (1976). La marina italiana en la guerra de España (in Spanish). Editorial Euros. ISBN 978-84-7364-051-0.
- Colledge, J. J.; Warlow, Ben (2006) [1969]. Ships of the Royal Navy: The Complete Record of All Fighting Ships of the Royal Navy from the 15th Century to the Present (3rd Rev ed.). London: Chatham Publishing. ISBN 978-1-86176-281-8. OCLC 67375475.
- English, John (1993). Amazon to Ivanhoe: British Standard Destroyers of the 1930s. Kendal, England: World Ship Society. ISBN 0-905617-64-9.
- Friedman, Norman (2009). British Destroyers From Earliest Days to the Second World War. Annapolis, Maryland: Naval Institute Press. ISBN 978-1-59114-081-8.
- Haarr, Geirr H. (2010). The Battle for Norway: April–June 1940. Barnsley, UK: Seaforth Publishing. ISBN 978-1-84832-057-4.
- Haarr, Geirr H. (2009). The German Invasion of Norway, April 1940. Annapolis, Maryland: Naval Institute Press. ISBN 978-1-59114-323-9.
- Lenton, H. T. (1998). British & Empire Warships of the Second World War. Annapolis, Maryland: Naval Institute Press. ISBN 1-55750-048-7.
- March, Edgar J. (1966). British Destroyers: A History of Development, 1892–1953; Drawn by Admiralty Permission From Official Records & Returns, Ships' Covers & Building Plans. London: Seeley Service. OCLC 164893555.
- Rohwer, Jürgen (2005). Chronology of the War at Sea 1939–1945: The Naval History of World War Two (Third Revised ed.). Annapolis, Maryland: Naval Institute Press. ISBN 1-59114-119-2.
- Smith, Peter C. (2004). Destroyer Leader: The Story of HMS Faulknor 1935–46 (3rd revised and expanded ed.). Barnsley, South Yorkshire, UK: Pen & Sword Maritime. ISBN 1-84415-121-2.
- Whitley, M. J. (1988). Destroyers of World War Two: An International Encyclopedia. Annapolis, Maryland: Naval Institute Press. ISBN 0-87021-326-1.
