= Barents Sea submarine campaign (1941) =

1941 submarine operation in the Barents Sea during the Second World War

Barents Sea submarine campaign in 1941
- Part of Arctic naval operations of World War II
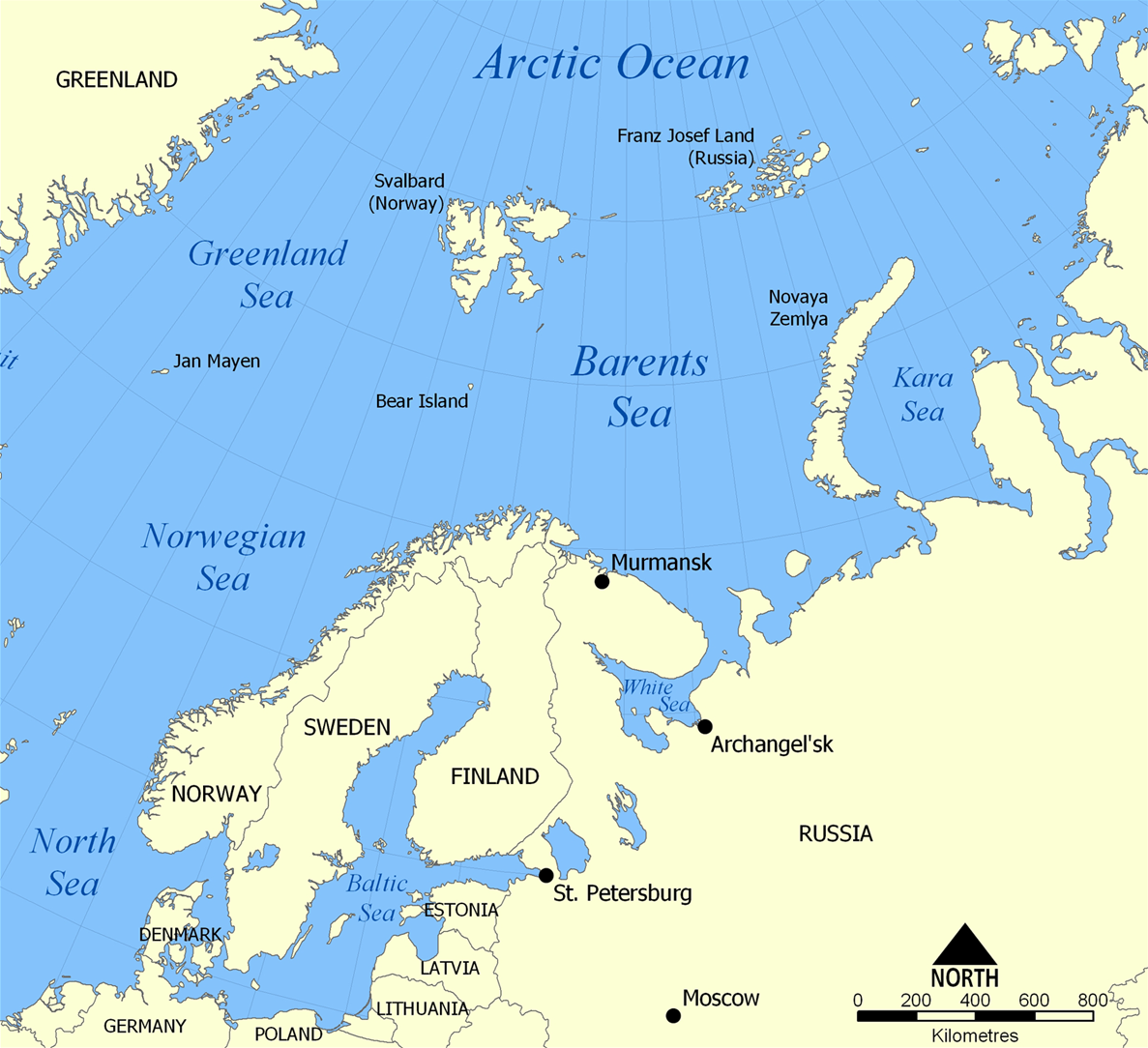
- The Barents Sea, north of Russia and Norway
Date	22 June–December 1941
Location	Barents Sea 69°12′N 33°28′E
Result	Allied victory

Belligerents
(Soviet Union) Soviet Navy (United Kingdom) Royal Navy	Kriegsmarine

Strength
23 Soviet submarines 4 British submarines	Anti-submarine forces

Casualties and losses
	1 Minesweeper damaged; 2 ASW vessels sunk; 1 ASW vessel damaged; 1 tanker sunk; 11 cargo ships sunk; 1 cargo ship damaged; 2 fishing vessels sunk
- Naval base of the Soviet Northern Fleet

The Barents Sea campaign in 1941 was a submarine operation in the Arctic waters of the Barents Sea during the Second World War. The operation was conducted by Soviet and British submarines. The submarines were based at Polyarny in the Soviet Union, to attack German shipping along the Norwegian coast.

The Soviet submarines suffered no losses but achieved only modest results, because of the Arctic climate and inexperience. The British submarines, with experienced crews, had more success. The Kriegsmarine was forced to suspend coastal traffic and send supplies through the Baltic Sea and overland through Finland, substantially hampering German land operations in the far north.

== Background ==
=== Soviet Northern Fleet ===
The Stalin purges of 1936 to 1938 removed many senior officers from the Northern Fleet. Admiral Arseny Golovko, the Commander-in-Chief (1940–1946) was 35 years old; his staff officers and submarine captains were also lacking in experience. The Soviet system of command was rigid, commissars were reinstated during the purge and on 16 July 1941 a commissar was appointed to almost every naval vessel. Commissars wore uniforms and were under the authority of their commanding officers but had the power independently to report through Party channels. Deviation from operational orders was dangerous and Divisional Commanders, also lacking in experience, sailed on operations to supervise submarine captains. Sixteen submarines were operational in the Arctic on 22 June 1941. Three submarines began defensive patrols around the Rybachy Peninsula, two off the Kola Inlet and four went on offensive patrols between Petsamo and the North Cape to observing shipping movements; no attacks were made on German shipping until mid-July.

=== Operation Barbarossa ===
At the beginning of the German invasion of the Soviet Union, the Northern Fleet operated fifteen submarines from Polyarny near Murmansk, later augmented by eight vessels of the Baltic Fleet. The British Operation EF (30 July 1941) was an attack by the aircraft carriers HMS Victorious and HMS Furious on the ports of Kirkenes and Liinakhamari in Petsamo, was something of a fiasco, sixteen aircraft being lost for the sinking of one ship and a coaster. On 12 July the Admiralty ordered the Home Fleet to prepare a force of ships to operate in the Arctic with the Russians under the command of Rear-Admiral Philip Vian but his reconnaissance to Murmansk was not optimistic; the lack of fighters made Murmansk unsafe as an offensive base and that the prospect of attacks on German shipping was not encouraging.

=== Prelude ===
Map of the Rybachy (Fisher) Peninsula

The Admiralty insisted on a show of support to the Russians and ships of the Home Fleet sailed on 27 July to Svalbard to assess the possibility of using it as a base, Vian reporting that it was not a viable alternative to Murmansk. Operations close to Norway were far too vulnerable to the Luftwaffe, two approaches being quickly detected by German reconnaissance aircraft. The Admiralty conducted Operation Gauntlet (25 August – 3 September 1941) to evacuate Norwegian and Soviet civilians from Svalbard, demolish the coal mines and to stop weather reports from the local wireless transmitter. Colliers were requested from the mainland and the three which arrived were sailed to Britain.

The force sailed close to Norway on the return journey and sank a training ship on 7 September. Two troop transports managed to escape and the cruiser HMS Nigeria suffered damage in the bow from a mine or a torpedo. During the first British convoy to the USSR, Operation Dervish, the concurrent Operation Strength (30 August – 14 September) took place. The aircraft carrier HMS Argus escorted by a heavy cruiser and three destroyers, ferried pilots, 24 Hurricanes and personnel of 151 Wing RAF to Russia. The Hurricanes were flown off Argus direct to Vaenga airfield, near Murmansk, for Operation Benedict, air operations in defence of the port.

== Allied submarine operations ==
=== August 1941 ===
Diagram of a Soviet K-class submarine

In August 1941, the Admiralty sent the submarines HMS Tigris and HMS Trident to Polyarny to attack the German coastal traffic. The Soviet submarines Shch-421, M-175, Shch-401, Shch-402, M-174 and the K-2 patrolled of the Arctic coast of Norway, K-2 making an abortive attack off Tanafjord against the steamers Hans and Lübeck on 13 August. M-173 reconnoitred Petsamo Fjord. On 21 August, M-172 entered the fjord, attacked and missed a ship moored at Liinakhamari and missed Alexander von Humboldt, a hospital ship, on 22 August off Petsamofjord. On 11 August, Tigris that had transferred to Polyarny began operations and on 16 August, Trident also began operations. Tigris operated off the Sværholt Peninsula and Trident off Lopphavet, a 70 km (43 mi)-wide stretch of open sea between the island of Sørøya and the islands of Arnøya and Nord-Fugløya. On 17 August Tigris sank the coaster Haakon Jarl (1,482 GRT) and on 19 August, Trident damaged the steamer Levante (4,769 GRT) with its deck gun. In attacks on convoys, Trident sank Ostpreussen (3,030 GRT) on 22 August and sank Donau (2,931 GRT) and Bahia Laura (8,561 GRT) on 30 August.

=== September 1941 ===
The D-3, Shch-403, M-173, K-1, Shch-422, M-174, K-2, Shch-401, M-171, M-172 and M-175 continued the patrols by the Soviet navy off the north Norwegian coast. K-1 spent 28 days off Vestfjorden but had no success but on 10 September, K-2 laid the first Soviet Arctic minefield, off the island of Vardøya, off the Varanger Peninsula. K-2 attacked Lofoten (1,517 GRT) off Persfjord on the north-eastern coast of the Varanger Peninsula with its deck gun but the ship escaped. Shch-422 made abortive attacks on 3 and 5 September, then on 12 September sank Ottar Jarl (1,459 GRT) off Tanafjord. On 13 and 14 September the submarines M-171 missed a ship off Liinamahari and M-172 failed to hit a ship off Bosfjord. M-173 carried 13 agents and landed them on the Varanger Peninsula; off Breisund, Tigris sank Richard With (905 GRT) and attacked ships in convoy on 15 and 17 September near Lopphavet, to no effect. The submarines K-3, K-22, L-20, L-22, S-101 and S-102 reached Belomorsk on the White Sea coast, via the White Sea Canal and joined the Northern Fleet on 15 September but L-20, L-22, S-101 and S-102 were incomplete and did not begin operations until 1942.

=== September–October 1941 ===
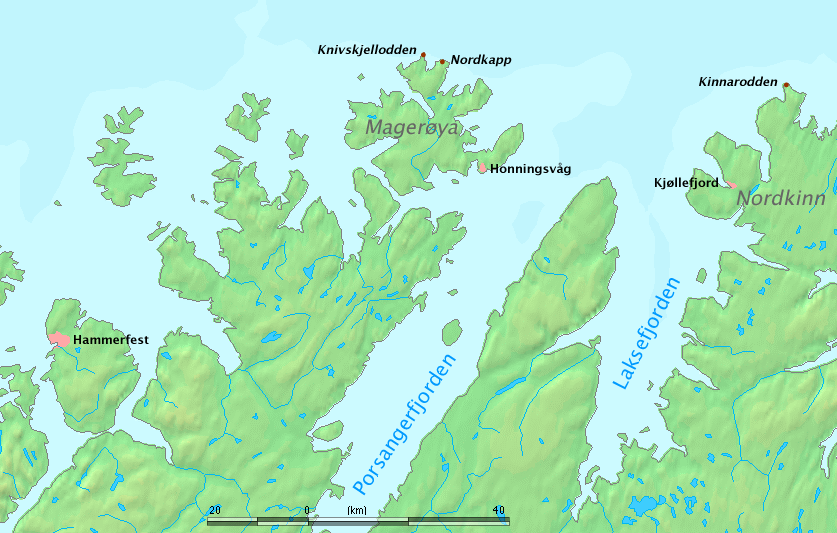
Map showing the Svaerholt Peninsula between Porsangerfjorden and Lakefjorden

Off the island of Rolvsøya, Trident attacked and missed Weser on 23 September and attacked Birka, a hospital ship, on 30 September to no effect. The anti-submarine vessel UJ 1201 was sunk convoying ships on 27 September. Shch-401 patrolled Svaerholt for a month but had no success. D-3 made attacks on 26, 27 and 30 September, 1 and 11 October but either missed its targets or its torpedoes hit cliffs. The submarines M-171, M-172, M-173, M-174, M-175 and M-176 conducted 6–8-day patrols around Varangerfjord. M-174 entered Petsamofjord on 26 September and went as far as Liinamahaari, followed by M-171 on 2 October but were only able to damage the pier. When M-176 tried to get into Bokfjord on 30 September, it fouled a net and had to return. On 3 October, M-176 attacked and missed a ship in Varangerfjord as did M-175 on 8 October. K-3, S-101 and S-102 reached Molotovsk from Belomorsk and made their way to Polyarny by November; L-20, L-22 were not ready and stayed in the White Sea.

=== October–November 1941 ===
Shch-402, Shch-404, Shch-422, M-172 and M-175 conducted more 6–8-day patrols off northern Norway. M-175 attacked and missed a ship on 8 October off Vardøya and on 17 October, Shch-402 sank Vesteraalen (682 GRT) returning from patrol on 25 October. Tigris, K-2, M-171, M-173 and M-174 patrolled between 14 and 20 October; Tigris attacked and missed ships in convoys off the Sværholt Peninsula on 11 and 14 October; Tigris beginning its return voyage to Britain on 20 October. S-101, S-102, Shch-401 and Shch-422 patrolled from 21 October to 16 November, Shch-421 attacked Joao Pessoa on 2 November and attacked Weissenburg on 9 and 19 November, both to no effect. M-172, M-174 and M-176 made short patrols off Varangerfjord, followed by M-173, M-172 and M-111. M-171, made a failed attack on 15 October and on 27 October the K-1 laid mines off Magerøysund and off Breisund on 29 October; Flottbek (1,930 GRT) was sunk on the first field on 8 November. K-23 laid mines of Kirkenes on 29 October, which sank the minesweeper M 22 on 5 November and the Norwegian Birk (3,664 GRT) on 15 February 1942.

=== November–December 1941 ===
Soviet S-class submarine

K-22 made an abortive patrol and K-21 attacked and missed ships on 9, 10 and 12 November in the Lopphavet seaway, between Sørøya and the islands of Arnøya and Nord-Fugløya. On 11 November, K-21 laid another minefield off Hammerfest, sinking Bessheim (1,774 GRT) on 21 November and the anti-submarine vessel UJ 1110 (510 GRT) on 9 July 1942. Trident sank the anti-submarine ship UJ 1213/Rau IV (354 GRT) on 3 November, attacked and missed Altkirch later that day and the minesweeper MRS 3/Bali on 7 November. Trident began its return to Britain on 16 November, replaced by Sealion that arrived on 6 November and Seawolf, arriving on 10 November. Sealion and Seawolf begin patrolling and Sealion surfaces and sank Vesco, a small tanker, with gunfire on 18 November. Seawolf made three attacks on convoys off Syltefjorden on 22 and 24 November but failed to obtain hits and Shch-402, K-2, M-174 and M-176 also fail to inflict losses.On the night of 19/20 November, K-23 planted four minefields off Kvaenangenfjord; K-3 laid two small mine barrages on 23 November off Hammerfest for no result. on 26 November, K-3 surfaced to fire on the Norwegian fishing boat Start and caused splinter wounds to seven members of the crew.

=== December 1941 ===
Off Rolvsøy on 3 December, K-3 attacked a convoy which included Altkirch but was depth-charged by the ASW vessels UJ 1403, UJ 1416 and UJ 1708, causing damage to the submarine and forcing it to the surface. In an exchange of fire, UJ 1708 (470 GRT) was hit and sunk; the other two vessels had only a 20 mm anti-aircraft armament against two 100 mm and two 45 mm guns on K-3 and fled. D-3, in Porsangerfjord, attacked shipping on 28 November, 5 and 6 December but failed to obtained torpedo hits. Sealion, patrolling off Tanafjord, sank Island (638 GRT) a Norwegian ship on 5 December and on the same day, M-171 attacked and missed a tanker in Varangerfjord; M-174 landed agents on the coast of Varanger. Shch-402, K-2, M-174, Shch-403 and M-176 patrolled but found nothing; Shch-421 fired at and missed a ship. K-22 sailed on 6 December and on 9 December, mined Rolvsøy Sound and attacked a Norwegian vessel which escaped. On 12 December, K-22 bombarded small vessels being towed near Mylingen, Hammerfest.

== Aftermath ==
=== Analysis ===
In Arctic conditions, torpedoes froze in their tubes when submarines were on the surface and they had to dive periodically at night to clear ice from the superstructure, which slowed battery charging. Guns froze; lubricating oil solidified; main vents jammed; periscope glass cracked; lookouts struggled to hold binoculars, which froze over; periscopes were hard to turn and canvas mats laid on the conning tower floor to prevent watch-keepers from slipping, tended to jam hatches. Visibility could change suddenly and the sea went from glassy smooth, sometimes with a heavy swell, which made depth-keeping awkward and ran the batteries down, to storms and high waves which blew up without warning. Faced with these difficulties, it is possible that the Soviet submarines had failed to sink anything by the time that Tigris and Trident commenced operations from Murmansk in the second half of August 1941. The British submarines sank four German ships of approximately 16,000 gross register tons (GRT) in a few days.

The Kriegsmarine lacked sufficient escorts adequately to protect its coastal traffic, which was vital to German army units operating in the far north and the British–Soviet campaign forced the suspension of the coastal traffic. The Germans had to send supplies through the Baltic Sea and overland through Finland, substantially hampering German land operations in the far north. The Senior British Naval Officer, North Russia, Captain Richard Bevan (1941–1942) reported that the captains of the small Soviet M-class submarines consistently showed dash and offensive spirit but that staff officers displayed "lack of offensive, excessive caution, concentration on minor details and a lack of commonsense, practical sense and foresight . . .". Lack of training and inexperience led Russian captains to fire one torpedo or a loose salvo and poor ship recognition led M-172 to fire two torpedoes at a tanker judged to be carrying 8,000 long tons (8,100 t) tons of fuel. One torpedo hit the ship because it was running too shallow; the ship was Vesco of 331 GRT.

The British were optimistic for D-3 which had adopted British salvo-firing methods and D-3 claimed four successes from 26 September to 11 October but D-3 hit no German ships and might have attacked Allied ships instead. Captain Lieutenant V. Utkin (K-3) claimed a 6,000 GRT ship with one hit from a salvo of four torpedoes, the sinking by gunfire of an armed trawler and an MTB but German records showed that the torpedo salvo missed. K-3 carried two 100 mm guns and outgunned the anti-submarine warfare (ASW) vessel UJ-1708 that carried one 88 mm and two 20 mm guns, the other escorts had only 20 mm weapons. At 9,800 ft (3,000 m) a hit caused the depth charges on UJ-1708 to explode and sink the vessel; the other boats made smoke and escaped. Soviet submariners made radio signals freely and B-Dienst the Kriegsmarine monitoring service, was easily able to establish what submarines were at sea. The Germans did not have sufficient ASW ships for counter-submarine operations but the Soviet submarine threat was limited and wireless intelligence was of little value to the Germans.

== Allied order of battle ==
=== Allied submarines ===
Allied submarines
Name	Flag	Type	Notes
HMS Sealion	Royal Navy	British S-class submarine	Anti-shipping
HMS Seawolf	Royal Navy	British S-class submarine	Anti-shipping
HMS Tigris	Royal Navy	British T-class submarine	Anti-shipping
HMS Trident	Royal Navy	British T-class submarine	Anti-shipping
D-3 Krasnogvardyeyets	Soviet Navy	Dekabrist-class submarine	Minelayer
K-1	Soviet Navy	Soviet K-class submarine	Cruiser submarine
K-2	Soviet Navy	Soviet K-class submarine	Cruiser submarine
K-3	Soviet Navy	Soviet K-class submarine	Cruiser submarine
K-21	Soviet Navy	Soviet K-class submarine	Cruiser submarine
K-22	Soviet Navy	Soviet K-class submarine	Cruiser submarine
K-23	Soviet Navy	Soviet K-class submarine	Cruiser submarine
L-20	Soviet Navy	Leninets-class submarine	Minelayer
L-22	Soviet Navy	Leninets-class submarine	Minelayer
M-171	Soviet Navy	Soviet M-class submarine	Small attack submarine
M-172	Soviet Navy	Soviet M-class submarine	Small attack submarine
M-173	Soviet Navy	Soviet M-class submarine	Small attack submarine
M-174	Soviet Navy	Soviet M-class submarine	Small attack submarine
M-175	Soviet Navy	Soviet M-class submarine	Small attack submarine
M-176	Soviet Navy	Soviet M-class submarine	Small attack submarine
S-101	Soviet Navy	Soviet S-class submarine	Medium ocean-going submarine
S-102	Soviet Navy	Soviet S-class submarine	Medium ocean-going submarine
ShCh-401	Soviet Navy	Shchuka-class submarine	Medium submarine
ShCh-402	Soviet Navy	Shchuka-class submarine	Medium submarine
ShCh-403	Soviet Navy	Shchuka-class submarine	Medium submarine
ShCh-404	Soviet Navy	Shchuka-class submarine	Medium submarine
ShCh-421	Soviet Navy	Shchuka-class submarine	Medium submarine
ShCh-422	Soviet Navy	Shchuka-class submarine	Medium submarine

== German order of battle ==
=== Merchant ships sunk ===
Merchant ships
Name	Year	Flag	GRT	Notes
Haakon Jarl	1904	Norway	1,482	Sunk, 17 August, HMS Tigris
Levante	1939	Nazi Germany	4,769	Sunk, 19 August, HMS Trident
Ostpreussen	1920	Nazi Germany	3,030	Sunk, 22 August, 70°12'N, 21°05'E, HMS Trident
Donau	1939	Nazi Germany	2,931	Sunk, 30 August, 70°35'N, 21°45'E, HMS Trident, 250 killed
Bahia Laura	1918	Nazi Germany	8,561	Sunk, 30 August, 70°35'N, 21°45'E, HMS Trident, 450 killed
Ottar Jarl	1921	Norway	1,459	Sunk, 12 September, off Tanafjord, Soviet submarine ShCh-422
Richard With	1909	Norway	905	Sunk, 13 September, off Breisund, HMS Tigris
Vesteraalen	1891	Norway	682	Sunk, 17 October, Soviet submarine ShCh-402
Flottbek	1926	Nazi Germany	1,930	Sunk 8 November, 70°56'N, 35°43'E Soviet submarine K-1, mine
Vesco	1926	Norway	331	Sunk, 18 November, HMS Seawolf
Altkirch		Nazi Germany	4,713	Survived torpedo attack 18 November
Island	1918	Norway	638	Sunk, 5 December, HMS Seawolf

=== Naval ships sunk ===
Kriegsmarine ship losses
Name	Flag	Type	Notes
UJ-1201	Kriegsmarine	Submarine chaser	Sunk, 27 September, by HMS Trident
UJ-1213/Rau IV	Kriegsmarine	Submarine chaser	Sunk, 3 September, by HMS Trident
UJ-1708	Kriegsmarine	Submarine chaser	Sunk, 3 December, by K-3
