= Soviet submarine K-56 =

Soviet submarine K-56 may refer to one of the following submarines of the Soviet Navy:

- Soviet submarine K-56 (1940), a K-class submarine; completed after World War II; sunk in nuclear tests in 1957
- Soviet submarine K-56 (1965), an Echo II-class (or Project 675) nuclear submarine; collided with merchant ship in June 1973, killing 27 men aboard
