= KLV (disambiguation) =

KLV is key-length-value, a data encoding standard

KLV or variant, may also refer to:

- Maskelynes language (ISO 639 language code klv)
- Karlovy Vary Airport (IATA airport code KLV), Karlovy Vary, Bohemia, Czechia
- Kelve Road railway station (station code KLV), Kelve Road, Palghar, Konkan, Maharashtra, India; see List of railway stations in India
- Key leader vehicle; see List of the United States military vehicles by model number
- Kinderlandverschickung (KLV, German: Verschickung der Kinder auf das Land, lit. 'relocation of children to the countryside'), the evacuations of children in Germany during World War II to the countryside
- Kolovratite (mineral code Klv), see List of mineral symbols
- KLV-TV (Karl-Lorimar Video), a home video brand
- KLV polynomial (Kazhdan–Lusztig–Vogan)

== See also ==
- K. L. V. Vasantha (1923–2008), Indian actress
- KLVS (107.3 FM), Livermore, California, USA
- Las Vegas Municipal Airport (ICAO airport code: KLVS), Las Vegas, San Miguel County, New Mexico, USA
- KL5
- K55 (disambiguation)
- KIV (disambiguation)
