= K56 =

K56 or K-56 may refer to:

- K-56 (1927–1937 Kansas highway), an historical designation of Kansas state highway K-52
- K-56 (1937–1957 Kansas highway), an historical designation of Kansas state highway K-98
- HMS Asphodel (K56), a British Royal Navy Flower-class corvette
- Potassium-56 (K-56 or ^{56}K), an isotope of potassium
- Soviet submarine K-56, various submarines of the Soviet Navy

== See also ==
- Koolhoven F.K.56, a 1930s Dutch aircraft
