= Convoy PQ 12 =

Arctic convoy sent to aid the Soviet Union during World War II

- Part of the Arctic Convoys of the Second World War
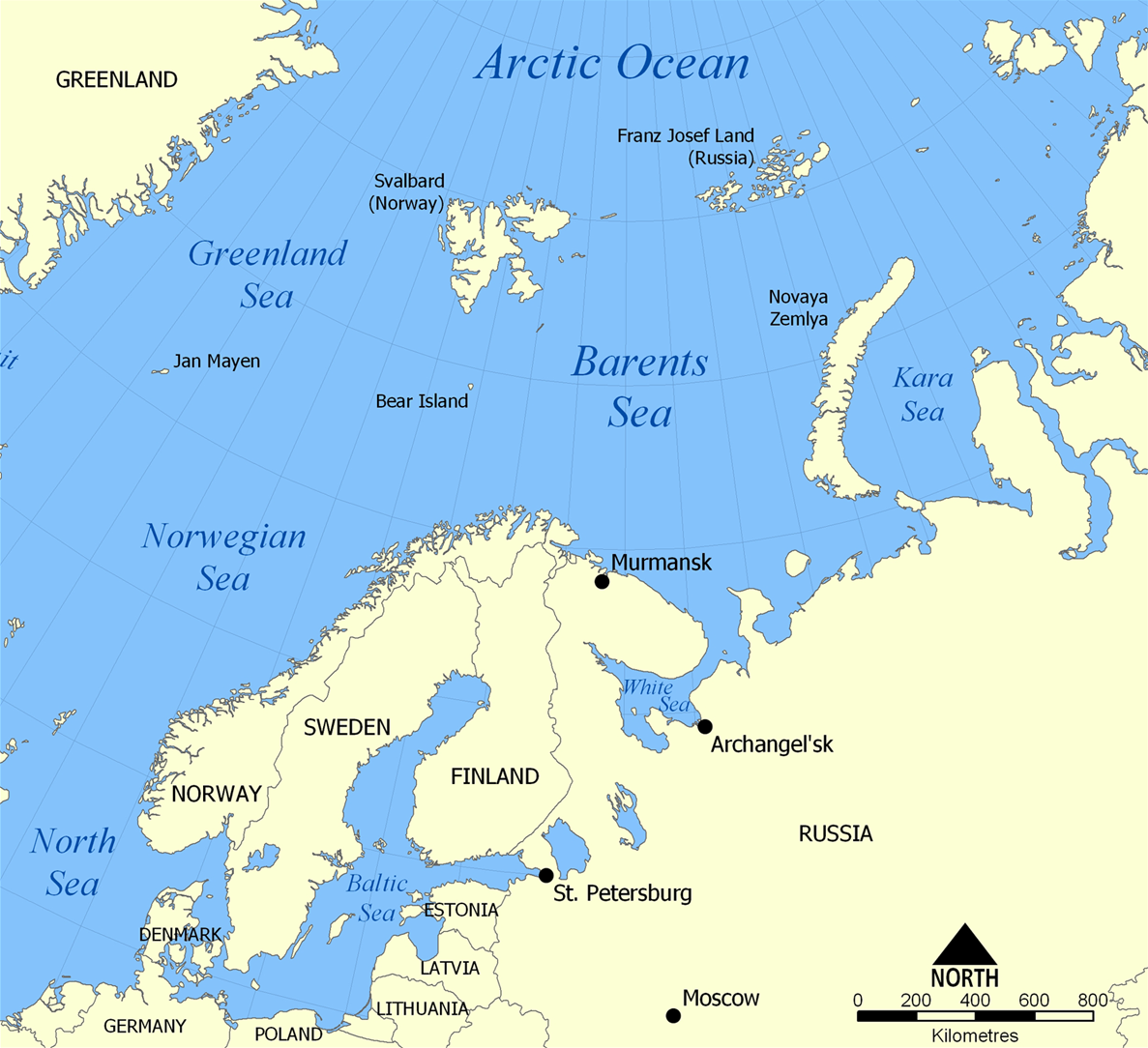
- The Norwegian and the Barents seas, site of the Arctic convoys
Date
Location
1–12 March 1942
- Norwegian Sea
- Barents Sea

Belligerents
United Kingdom; Soviet Union	Germany

Commanders and leaders
Convoy Commodore: Hubert Hudson; Escorts: John McBeath	Otto Ciliax

Strength
15 Merchant ships; Escort forces	1 Battleship; 4 Destroyers

Casualties and losses
1 Whaler; 3 survivors	1 Aircraft

Convoy PQ 12 (1–12 March 1942) was an Arctic convoy sent from Reykjavík in Iceland by the Allies to Murmansk, to supply the Soviet Union during the Second World War. The Germans conducted Operation Sportpalast with the battleship Tirpitz and three destroyers against the convoys but found neither.

The Home Fleet attempted to intercept the German flotilla but in the fog and storms both sides lacked the air reconnaissance necessary to find their opponents during the passage of the convoys. The British managed an air attack with Albacore torpedo-bombers on Tirpitz as it returned to base but were unable to hit it and lost two of the bombers.

The convoy reached Murmansk for no loss but HMS Oribi suffered ice damage to its bow on the night of 6/7 March and had to be detached from the convoy. On 9 March, one of the escorts, the whaler HMS Shera, capsized in a storm after ice formed on the superstructure, all but three of the crew being lost.

Both sides pondered their prospects after the convoy operation. Tovey thought that concentrating the Home Fleet in seas patrolled by U-boats was too risky and that making a maximum effort to sink German ships mattered more than attacking a convoy. The Admiralty took the view that protecting a convoy was the best way to bring the German ships to battle.

Seekriegsleitung (SKL, the command staff of the Kriegsmarine) thought that Tirpitz had, by luck, narrowly escaped severe damage at least and it did not sail against a convoy for three months. With the responsibility of protecting Norway from invasion and attacking convoys, SKL decided to reserve the big ships for anti-invasion operations and to attack convoys with destroyers.

== Background ==
=== Lend-lease ===
The Soviet leaders needed to replace the colossal losses of military equipment lost after the German invasion, especially when Soviet war industries were being moved out of the war zone and emphasised tank and aircraft deliveries. Machine tools, steel and aluminium was needed to replace indigenous resources lost in the invasion. The pressure on the civilian sector of the economy needed to be limited by food deliveries. The Soviets wanted to concentrate the resources that remained on items that the Soviet war economy had the greatest comparative advantage over the German economy. Aluminium imports allowed aircraft production to a far greater extent than would have been possible using local sources and tank production was emphasised at the expense of lorries and food supplies were squeezed by reliance on what could be obtained from lend–lease. At the Moscow Conference, it was acknowledged that 1.5 million tons of shipping was needed to transport the supplies of the First Protocol and that Soviet sources could provide less than 10 per cent of the carrying capacity.

The British and Americans accepted that the onus was on them to find most of the shipping, despite their commitments in other theatres. The Prime Minister, Winston Churchill, made a promise to send a convoy to the Arctic ports of the USSR every ten days and to deliver 1,200 tanks a month from July 1942 to January 1943, followed by 2,000 tanks and another 3,600 aircraft more than already promised. In November, the US president, Franklin D. Roosevelt, ordered Admiral Emory Land of the US Maritime Commission and then the head of the War Shipping Administration that deliveries to Russia should only be limited by 'insurmountable difficulties'. The first convoy was due at Murmansk around 12 October and the next convoy was to depart Iceland on 22 October. A motley of British, Allied and neutral shipping loaded with military stores and raw materials for the Soviet war effort would be assembled at Hvalfjörður in Iceland, convenient for ships from both sides of the Atlantic.

From Operation Dervish to Convoy PQ 11, the supplies to the USSR were mostly British, in British ships defended by the Royal Navy. A fighter force that could defend Murmansk was delivered that protected the Arctic ports and railways into the hinterland. Before September 1941 the British had dispatched 450 aircraft, 22,000 long tons (22,000 t) of rubber, 3,000,000 pairs of boots and stocks of tin, aluminium, jute, lead and wool. In September representatives from Britain and the United States travelled to Moscow to study Soviet requirements and their ability to meet them. The representatives of the three countries drew up a protocol in October 1941 to last until June 1942. British supplied aircraft and tanks reinforced the Russian defences of Leningrad and Moscow from December 1941. The tanks and aircraft did not save Moscow but were important in the Soviet counter-offensive. The Luftwaffe was by then reduced to 600 operational aircraft on the Eastern Front, to an extent a consequence of Luftflotte 2 being sent to the Mediterranean against the British. Tanks and aircraft supplied by the British helped the Soviet counter-offensive force push the Germans further back than might have been possible. In January and February 1941, deliveries of tanks and aircraft allowed the Russians to have a margin of safety should the Germans attempt to counter-attack.

=== Signals intelligence ===
==== Ultra ====
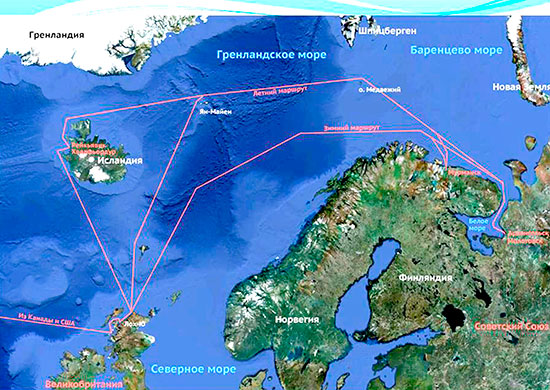
Russian map showing Arctic convoy routes from Britain and Iceland, past Norway to the Barents Sea and northern Russian ports

The British Government Code and Cypher School (GC&CS) based at Bletchley Park housed a small industry of code-breakers and traffic analysts. By June 1941, the German Enigma machine Home Waters (Heimish) settings used by surface ships and U-boats could quickly be read. On 1 February 1942, the Enigma machines used in U-boats in the Atlantic and Mediterranean were changed but German ships and the U-boats in Arctic waters continued with the older Heimish Home Hydra from 1942, Dolphin to the British). By mid-1941, British Y-stations were able to receive and read Luftwaffe W/T transmissions and give advance warning of Luftwaffe operations. In 1941, naval Headache personnel with receivers to eavesdrop on Luftwaffe wireless transmissions were embarked on warships.

==== B-Dienst ====
The rival German Beobachtungsdienst (B-Dienst, Observation Service) of the Kriegsmarine Marinenachrichtendienst (MND, Naval Intelligence Service) had broken several Admiralty codes and cyphers by 1939, which were used to help Kriegsmarine ships elude British forces and provide opportunities for surprise attacks. From June to August 1940, six British submarines were sunk in the Skaggerak using information gleaned from British wireless signals. In 1941, B-Dienst read signals from the Commander in Chief Western Approaches informing convoys of areas patrolled by U-boats, enabling the submarines to move into "safe" zones. B-Dienst had broken Naval Cypher No 3 in February 1942 and by March was reading up to 80 per cent of the traffic, which continued until 15 December 1943. By coincidence, the British lost access to Atlantic U-boat signals when the Shark cypher was introduced and had no information to send in Cypher No 3 that might compromise Ultra.

By February 1942, German naval intelligence had established the evolution of Arctic convoys; PQ convoys departed from Iceland (possibly Seyðisfjörður) heading to the south of Bear Island (Bjørnøya) then eastwards to around 38°40′E, turning south to 70°N then dividing for Murmansk and Arkhangelsk. The reciprocal QP convoys went more to the south or east, ships bound for Britain heading direct for Scotland. The convoys had departed at eight-to-ten day intervals but recently had appeared to be operating on a fifteen-day cycle, voyages lasting nine to ten days, with about ten to fifteen ships apiece. Until the end of February, the British had lost only one ship (SS Waziristan).

=== Arctic Ocean ===
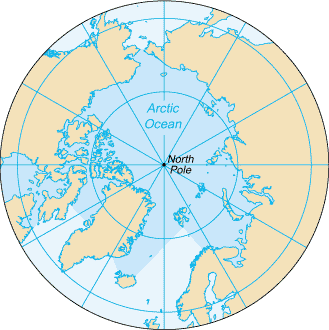
Diagram of the Arctic Ocean

Between Greenland and Norway are some of the most stormy waters of the world's oceans, 890 mi (1,440 km) of water under gales of snow, sleet and hail. The cold Arctic water was met by the Gulf Stream, warm water from the Gulf of Mexico, which became the North Atlantic Drift. Arriving at the south-west of England the drift moves between Scotland and Iceland; north of Norway the drift splits. One stream bears north of Bear Island to Svalbard and a southern stream follows the coast of Murmansk into the Barents Sea. The mingling of cold Arctic water and warmer water of higher salinity generates thick banks of fog for convoys to hide in but the waters drastically reduced the effectiveness of Asdic as U-boats moved in waters of differing temperatures and density.

In winter, polar ice can form as far south as 50 mi (80 km) off the North Cape and in summer it can recede to Svalbard. The area is in perpetual darkness in winter and permanent daylight in the summer and can make air reconnaissance almost impossible. Around the North Cape and in the Barents Sea the sea temperature rarely rises about 4 °C (39 °F) and a man in the water will die unless rescued immediately. The cold water and air makes spray freeze on the superstructure of ships, which has to be removed quickly to avoid the ship becoming top-heavy. Conditions in U-boats were, if anything, worse the boats having to submerge in warmer water to rid the superstructure of ice. Crewmen on watch were exposed to the elements, oil lost its viscosity and nuts froze and sheared off bolts. Heaters in the hull were too demanding of current and could not be run continuously.

== Prelude ==
=== Kriegsmarine ===
Kriegsmarine in red, Luftwaffe in blue, North Cape in green

Two U-boats were based in Norway in July 1941, four in September, five in December and two in January 1942, seven in February, nine in March and one in April, 23 boats in all, a number maintained for the rest of the year. Hitler contemplated establishing a unified command but decided against it. The German battleship Tirpitz arrived at Trondheim on 16 January, the first ship of a general move of battleships and cruisers to Norway. British convoys to Russia had received little attention in 1941, since they averaged only eight ships each and the long Arctic winter nights negated even the limited Luftwaffe reconnaissance effort that was available. After Tirpitz, the cruisers Prinz Eugen and Admiral Scheer arrived on 23 February. On 21 March the cruiser Admiral Hipper arrived and on 26 May Lutzow joined the fleet. The U-boats reinforcements to Norway in 1942, along with the big ships, allowed the Kriegsmarine to contemplate more ambitious operations against Arctic convoys.

The arrival of more ships in Norway was of little use without fuel and in November 1941 the oil reserve of the Kriegsmarine stood at 380,000 long tons (390,000 t) with a monthly use of 100,000 long tons (100,000 t) and another 100,000 long tons (100,000 t) delivered to the Regia Marina and a monthly allotment of 84,000 long tons (85,000 t). In February the fuel reserve had declined to 150,000 long tons (150,000 t) and deliveries down to 50,000 long tons (51,000 t), the Channel Dash consuming 20,000 long tons (20,000 t). In March the fuel crisis was such that "fleet operations of any importance [were] absolutely out of the question". In April the fuel shortage worsened with receipts of 8,000 long tons (8,100 t) of fuel from Rumania instead of the expected 46,000 long tons (47,000 t) causing a suspension of operations, even by light forces. (The British followed this crisis through Ultra decrypts with great interest.)

Seekriegsleitung (SKL, Naval Warfare Command) of the Oberkommando der Marine (OKM) had been given contradictory instructions by Adolf Hitler, to hold the ships in Norway ready to repulse a British invasion attempt and to attack Allied Arctic convoys. Defence against an invasion needed the big ships to remain operational when attacks against convoys courted damage and losses, leaving the Kriegsmarine short of ships to counter an invasion. Either way, the navy needed the cooperation of Luftflotte 5 to reconnoitre the convoy route through the Greenland Sea, Norwegian Sea and the Barents Sea and to attack ships at long distance from Norway. Before these matters had been agreed and SKL had issued instructions for the use of Tirpitz and Hipper, General Admiral Rolf Carls, the head of Marinegruppenkommando Nord (MGK Nord) approached Grand Admiral Erich Raeder, the head of OKM, for permission to attack the next Arctic convoy with Tirpitz and three destroyers.

=== Luftflotte 5 ===
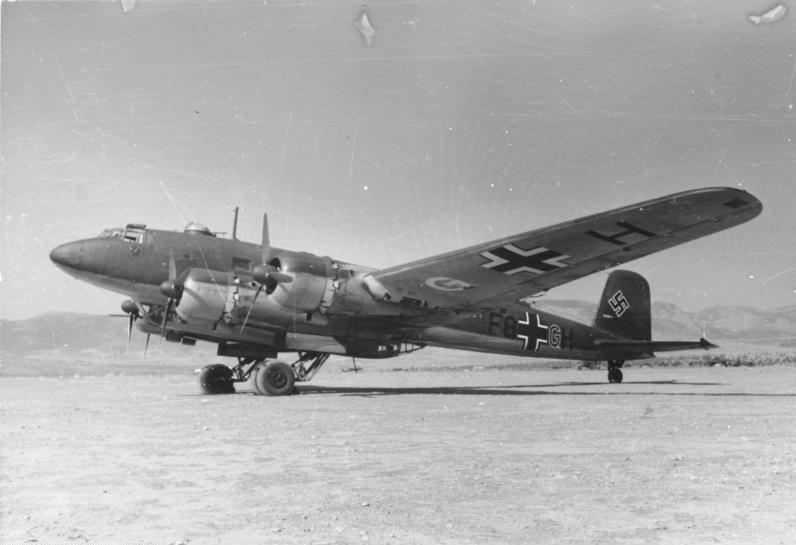
A Focke-Wulf Fw 200 Kondor of KG 40

In mid-1941, Luftflotte 5 (Air Fleet 5) had been re-organised for Operation Barbarossa with Luftgau Norwegen (Air Region Norway) headquartered in Oslo. Fliegerführer Stavanger (Air Commander Stavanger) the centre and north of Norway, Jagdfliegerführer Norwegen (Fighter Leader Norway) commanded the fighter force and Fliegerführer Kerkenes (Oberst [colonel] Andreas Nielsen) in the far north had airfields at Kirkenes and Banak. The Air Fleet had 180 aircraft, sixty of which were reserved for operations on the Karelian Front against the Red Army.

The distance from Banak to Arkhangelsk was 560 mi (900 km) and Fliegerführer Kerkenes had only ten Junkers Ju 88 bombers of Kampfgeschwader 30, thirty Junkers Ju 87 Stuka dive-bombers ten Messerschmitt Bf 109 fighters of Jagdgeschwader 77, five Messerschmitt Bf 110 heavy fighters of Zerstörergeschwader 76, ten reconnaissance aircraft and an anti-aircraft battalion. Sixty aircraft were far from adequate in such a climate and terrain where

...there is no favourable season for operations. (Earl Ziemke [1959] in Claasen [2001])

The emphasis of air operations changed from army support to anti-shipping operations only after March 1942, when Allied Arctic convoys becoming larger and more frequent coincided with the reinforcement of Norway with ships and aircraft and the less extreme climatic conditions of the Arctic summer. On 22 January 1942, Hitler ordered Hermann Goering to reinforce Luftflotte 5 and by the end of the month a new bomber wing was added to the order of battle, with three Staffeln (squadrons) of Heinkel He 111 torpedo-bombers, after the Luftwaffe had overcome opposition from the Kriegsmarine and by July there were 77 torpedo-bombers, about half being Junkers Ju 88s but the first unit did not arrive in the Arctic until late April.

=== Arctic convoys ===
A convoy was defined as at least one merchant ship sailing under the protection of at least one warship. At first the British had intended to run convoys to Russia on a forty-day cycle (the number of days between convoy departures) during the winter of 1941–1942 but this was shortened to a ten-day cycle. The round trip to Murmansk for warships was three weeks and each convoy needed a cruiser and two destroyers, which severely depleted the Home Fleet. Convoys left port and rendezvoused with the escorts at sea. A cruiser provided distant cover from a position to the west of Bear Island. Air support was limited to the Norwegian 330 Squadron RNoAF and 269 Squadron RAF of Coastal Command from Iceland, with some help from anti-submarine patrols along the coast of Norway from RAF Sullom Voe in Shetland. Anti-submarine trawlers escorted the convoys on the first part of the outward voyage. Built for Arctic conditions, the trawlers were coal-burning ships and had sufficient endurance. The trawlers were commanded by their peacetime crews and captains with the rank of Skipper, Royal Naval Reserve (RNR) who were used to Arctic conditions, supplied by anti-submarine specialists of the Royal Naval Volunteer Reserve (RNVR). British minesweepers based at Arkhangelsk met the convoys to join the escort for the remainder of the voyage.

In February 1942, the Germans continued the assembly of a force of battleships and heavy cruisers in Norway and the British 10th Cruiser Squadron (Rear-Admiral Harold Burrough) continued its patrols between Bear island and Kola Inlet, a fjord on the Barents Sea and the route to the port of Murmansk. Burrough urged the Soviet naval authorities to implement anti-submarine patrols and provide air cover for convoys, that the Admiralty believed was well within the capacity of the Soviet Navy and Soviet Air Forces to conduct. Tovey, in his analysis of the reinforcement of German navy and air forces in Norway, predicted attacks by the German ships between Jan Mayen and Bear Island, with attacks by U-boats and aircraft east of Bear Island. To increase the effect of the British ships, Tovey wanted the next outbound convoy and its reciprocal return convoy to sail at the same time. The returning 15 ships of Convoy QP 8 were held back on the Kola Inlet for four days and sailed on 1 March as the 18 ships of Convoy PQ 12 sailed from Iceland, the first convoy to have distant cover from the Home Fleet. Coastal Command increased its patrols over Trondheim and B-24 Liberators flew reconnaissance sorties north-eastwards from Iceland.

=== Convoy PQ 12 ===
5th meridian west (interactive map)
14th meridian east (interactive map)

The convoy consisted of 16 ships under the command of the Convoy Commodore, Hubert Hudson with the western local escort of the anti-submarine warfare (ASW) trawlers HMT Angle, Chiltern, Notts County and Stella Capella. The convoy was to be joined by five former whalers of the Royal Norwegian Navy (Sjøforsvaret) HMS Shera, Shusa, Stefa, Sulla and Svega. The close escort comprised the minesweeper HMS Gossamer and the whalers. On 5 March the Ocean Escort of the destroyers HMS Oribi (Commander John McBeath, Senior Officer escort) and Offa was to join.

=== Home Fleet ===
Tovey intended for his deputy, Vice-Admiral Alban Curteis, to provide the heavy cover for the convoys between the 5th meridian west and the 14th meridian east, with the battleship HMS Duke of York, the battlecruiser HMS Renown, HMS Kenya and the destroyers HMS Echo, Eclipse, Eskimo, Faulknor, Fury and Punjabi. Admiral John Tovey intended to stay at Scapa Flow with the battleship HMS King George V, the aircraft carrier HMS Victorious, the cruiser HMS Berwick and the destroyers HMS Ashanti, Bedouin, Icarus, Intrepid, Lookout and Onslow, convenient to intercept a sortie by German ships into the Atlantic or to join Curteis, depending on events. The ships at Scapa would sail if the German ships sailed or if air reconnaissance over Trondheim failed. Coastal Command flew extra patrols during Arctic convoys but these were not as useful as hoped, due to a lack of aircraft and the weather, that often made reconnaissance impossible.

Tovey doubted that Tirpitz would take on the ships led by Curteis and the force at Scapa Flow might be able to get between Tirpitz and the Norwegian coast to force battle. Tovey was concerned to conserve the Home Fleet after the Channel Dash by the German battleships Scharnhorst and Gneisenau assumed to be intended to join the big ships based in Norway. If all of the ships of the Home Fleet were engaged on Arctic convoy operations, the loss of opportunities for leave and refits would lead to a decline in efficiency. The Admiralty demurred, wanting to guarantee superiority over the Germans ships and to have the benefit of air cover from the aircraft carrier, despite the lack of aircraft in Luftflotte 5 and Tovey having ordered Curteis to keep at least 250 nmi (460 km; 290 mi) from the Norwegian coast, unless chasing the big German ships. The Admiralty took "full responsibility for any break-out of German ships which may occur while you are covering PQ and QP convoys". Curteis was to sail from Hvalfjörður (Whale Fjord, near Reykjavík) on 3 March and Tovey from Scapa Flow on the next day, to meet during the morning of 6 March at 71°N, 3°E, when Convoy PQ 12 was anticipated to be north of the position and cruise about 50 nmi (93 km; 58 mi) south of the convoy.

== Voyage ==
=== 1−6 March ===
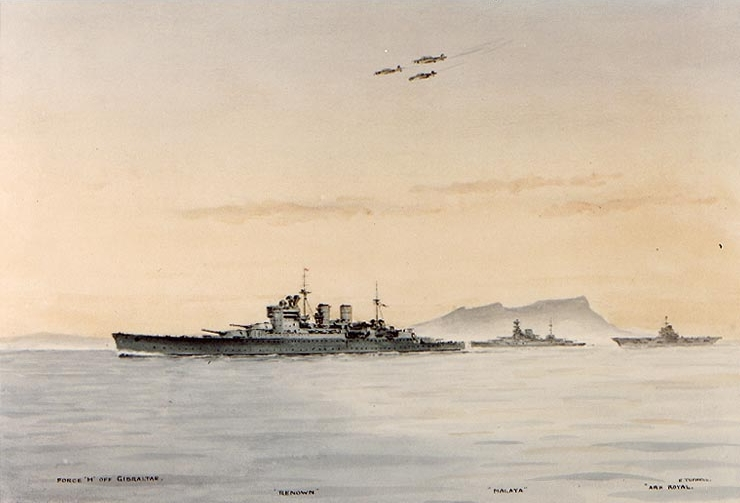
HMS Renown painted in 1941

On 1 March 1942, Convoy PQ 12 sailed from Reykjavík with 15 ships and an oiler; Convoy QP 8 departed from Murmansk. Convoy PQ 12 was accompanied by a western local escort of four ASW trawlers. The five whalers were due to join the convoy on 4 March but only two arrived; two had turned back and one made an independent voyage to the USSR; SS Bateau turned back to Iceland. The ocean escort of the destroyers Offa and Oribi (Commander John McBeath, Senior Officer escort) rendezvoused with the convoy on the same day about 100 nmi (190 km; 120 mi) south of Jan Mayen.

The ocean escort relieved the western local escort; Kenya (Captain Michael Denny) arrived later in the day, after being detached by Curteis. When about 75 nmi (139 km; 86 mi) to the south-east of Jan Mayen, the convoy was spotted by a Fw 200 Kondor. Also at sea was the covering force (Vice-Admiral Alban Curteis) from Reykjavík, having sailed on 3 March and the rest of the Home Fleet (Admiral John Tovey) from Scapa Flow on 4 March. On 6 March, Kenya detached from the convoy but returned after Curteis and Tovey rendezvoused.

=== 7 March ===
The convoys crossed at noon, 200 nmi (370 km; 230 mi) to the south-west of Bear Island. When the captain of HMS Hazard, from Convoy QP 8, compared positions with Kenya, a difference of 95 nmi (176 km; 109 mi) was found, not unusual that close to the North Pole and after a lack of celestial and solar sights. Convoy QP 8 was advised to steer more to the south to avoid the ice that had hampered Convoy PQ 12. Wireless transmissions suggested action but no-one realised how close Convoy QP 8 had been to the German ships. Convoy PQ 12 sailed on and during the afternoon, Kenya sped to investigate smoke on the horizon, that had become visible at 30 nmi (56 km; 35 mi), because of the abrupt changes in visibility that far north. The ship turned out to be a merchant ship that had straggled from Convoy QP 8 (probably Ijora).

Soon afterwards, Denny received a signal from the Admiralty, that German ships might be near and he turned the convoy to the north, then received a signal thatIjora was under attack. Uncertain of the position given by the ship, after the discrepancy of position revealed earlier in the day, Denny consulted with Hudson and McBeath in Oribi, who had lost two men overboard. As night began to fall, the convoy turned east-north-east and the Walrus amphibian from Kenya was sent to reconnoitre, with orders not to give away the position of the convoy. Nothing was spotted to the south-west and the convoy turned north-east, to get closer to the course that it had deviated from due to the ice.

==== Unternehmen Sportpalast ====
The Kriegsmarine headquarters received the Kondor reconnaissance report without surprise, having expected convoys in both directions in early March and had received other reconnaissance reports that the big ships seen off Murmansk on 27 February were not there on 1 March. An air search to the north-west of Norway was undertaken by Luftflotte 5, as fair as its limited number of aircraft allowed. After obtaining permission from Adolf Hitler, Tirpitz sortied from Trondheim at 11:00 a.m. on 6 March with the destroyers Z7 Hermann Schoemann, Z14 Friedrich Ihn and Z25, to begin Unternehmen Sportpalast (Operation Sports Palace) to destroy Convoy PQ 12 and its reciprocal, Convoy QP 8. After departing Trondheim, Ciliax received no more sighting reports of Convoy PQ 12. At 8:30 a.m. on 7 March, Ciliax detached the destroyers to reconnoitre to the north-north-west, on a bearing of 342°, towards the position that Convoy QP 12 was assumed to be at 3:00 p.m. An hour later when at about 70°28′N, 11°30′E Tirpitz also turned to the north-west. The convoy was about 95 nmi (176 km; 109 mi) in front of the destroyers on a heading of 343° and the Home Fleet was 110 nmi (200 km; 130 mi) to the west of Tirpitz on a heading of 360°, both forces on a converging course.

The weather prevented Ciliax from sending the two seaplanes on Tirpitz to reconnoitre at 11:00 a.m. The German ships passed 60 nmi (110 km; 69 mi) to the east of the Home Fleet at 1:00 p.m., then turned further northwards and the gap between the two forces increased again. The two convoys had crossed over at noon and this took Convoy PQ 12 out of immediate danger from the German ships. Convoy QP 8 was heading west-south-west, 50 nmi (93 km; 58 mi) north-east of Tirpitz and much closer to the destroyers, that were heading north-north-west at about 5 nmi (9.3 km; 5.8 mi) intervals; Z25 might have come within 10 nmi (19 km; 12 mi) of the convoy at 2:00 p.m. At 3:45 p.m., smoke was spotted from the ship SS Ijora that had straggled; the crew managed to broadcast a distress call at 4:32 p.m. giving its position at 72°35′N, 10°50′E. The ship was sunk by Friedrich Ihn at 5:13 p.m. The German account put the sinking at 72°40′N, 10°30′E. Tirpitz turned towards the destroyers, the ships united at 5:28 p.m. and turned eastwards. The destroyers were running short of fuel and due to fuel from Tirpitz that night. The ships turned south to find waters free of ice, to no avail and the ships turned to 86°. Friedrich Ihn was sent back to Tromsö to fuel at 8:35 p.m. and at 4:00 a.m. on 8 March, the other destroyers were also sent to Tromsö, Tirpitz remaining to search for a convoy.

=== 8 March ===
At 4:00 a.m. Convoy PQ 12 was about 90 nmi (170 km; 100 mi) south-west of Bear Island, heading towards it on a bearing of 40°. Tirpitz was 90 nmi (170 km; 100 mi) to the south-east, was heading east, about to turn north to search for the convoy south and west of the island. The Home Fleet was about 250 nmi (460 km; 290 mi) to the south-west of Tirpitz, soon to turn for Iceland as Tirpitz had apparently abandoned its operation. Convoy QP 8 was about 270 nmi (500 km; 310 mi) west-south-west of Tirpitz, heading west at about 9 kn (17 km/h; 10 mph). At 7:00 a.m. Tirpitz turned north, to sweep the estimated convoy route and at 10:45 a.m. was at about 73°23′N, 20°9′E and began to zig-zag either side of a heading of 255°; Tirpitz passed south of Bear Island at noon. Convoy PQ 12 was heading north, about 75 nmi (139 km; 86 mi) to the north-west of Tirpitz. Nothing had been heard of SS Ijora or Tirpitz overnight but the Admiralty sent orders to pass to the north of Bear Island, ice permitting.

At dawn the convoy turned north but Denny cautioned the Commodore, Hubert Hudson, not to lead the destroyers into the ice. The weather and the ice soon convinced them that the Admiralty instructions were impractical. The convoy turned south-east just after noon, to pass south of Bear Island after dark. Around 3:30 p.m. the island became visible through the snowfalls about 40 nmi (74 km; 46 mi) to the north-east, along with the ice field and at 5:00 p.m. the ships ran into the edge of the ice and then spent three hours working their way free and regaining formation. Apprehensive about Oribi, with its damaged bow, Denny ordered it to detach and make an independent voyage to Murmansk and it arrived two days later on 10 March. The convoy hugged the ice-edge and at 8:00 p.m. was still 40 nmi (74 km; 46 mi) south-south-west of Bear Island and about 110 nmi (200 km; 130 mi) north-east of Tirpitz.

=== 9–14 March ===
The convoy had a quiet journey after extricating itself from the ice field. Offa detected an aircraft by radar but sea smoke of unusual thickness cloaked the ships and a two-hour course change evaded the aircraft and an intercepted signal about the attack on Tirpitz near the Lofoten Islands suggested that the threat of attack by ships was at an end. Shera (William Bulmer, RNR) with Svega, had followed the convoy route after never catching up with it but Shera capsized during the day through icing and storms, only three members of the crew being rescued; Svega arriving at Murmansk on 11 March. The eastern local escort of the Soviet destroyer Gremyashchiy and the British Halcyon-class minesweepers Gossamer, Harrier, Hussar and Speedwell joined the convoy also on 11 March. The bulk of the convoy arrived at Murmansk on 12 March. Kiev had lost touch with the convoy on 3 March, El Occidente in the ice-field met on 6 March and Sevzaples on 11 March when the convoy ran into ice again. Kiev and El Occidente reached Iokanka on 10 March. Sevzaples joined with Stefa another whaler that had straggled on 6 May. When about 100 nmi (190 km; 120 mi) from Murmansk on 13 March, Sevzaples was attacked by an aircraft but Stefa shot it down; both arrived on 14 March.

== Aftermath ==
=== Royal Navy ===
Denny wrote later that the weather was excellent for an unobserved passage and the Arctic sea smoke (fog that forms over areas of open water amidst sea ice) had made it difficult for U-boats to find the convoy and that low cloud had made bombing impossible. In his report, Hudson wrote that many of the merchant captains were disturbed to hear the BBC report that an Arctic convoy was en route to Russia. At Murmansk, complaints were made that cargoes loaded in the US were in much better condition than those loaded in Britain, due to poor ballasting and inadequately packed and secured items. Apparently British dockworkers loaded the heaviest items first that put them lower than the longitudinal centre of gravity, acting like a pendulum in stormy seas, causing wire cables to cut packing and damage the contents. In the post-war staff history, Lewis Pitcairn-Jones wrote that Tovey called the passage of the convoy "an example of the virtue of keeping wireless silence", the only sighting of the convoy having been obtained by the Kondor on 5 March, near Jan Mayen.

Tovey reported to the Admiralty on 14 March that he thought that the concentration of German ships in Norway was for defence against an invasion and had rules of engagement that forbade battle with the big ships of the Home Fleet. Tovey wanted to retain the instructions that he issued before the Admiralty message of 3 March, that protection of the convoy had priority and that he must have fighter cover when within reach of shore-based aircraft. Tovey felt that operating the big ships together was too risky, with so many U-boats in Arctic waters. Tovey called his instructions a 'severe embarrassment' because he viewed the sinking of Tirpitz to be far more important than the protection of a convoy. When notified that Tirpitz had sailed, Tovey wanted a free hand to sink it. Tovey thought that the real threat to convoys was from U-boats and aircraft and that the present arrangements against them were insufficient. The Admiralty thought it unwise to base a plan on an assumption that an opponent was reluctant to engage and wondered if two battleships were sufficient, considering the fate of HMS Hood the year previous. The Admiralty concurred with Tovey that the fleet should stay west of the 14th meridian east, if it was not screened by destroyers and ruled that the destruction was paramount but this would best be achieved by closely supporting the convoys.

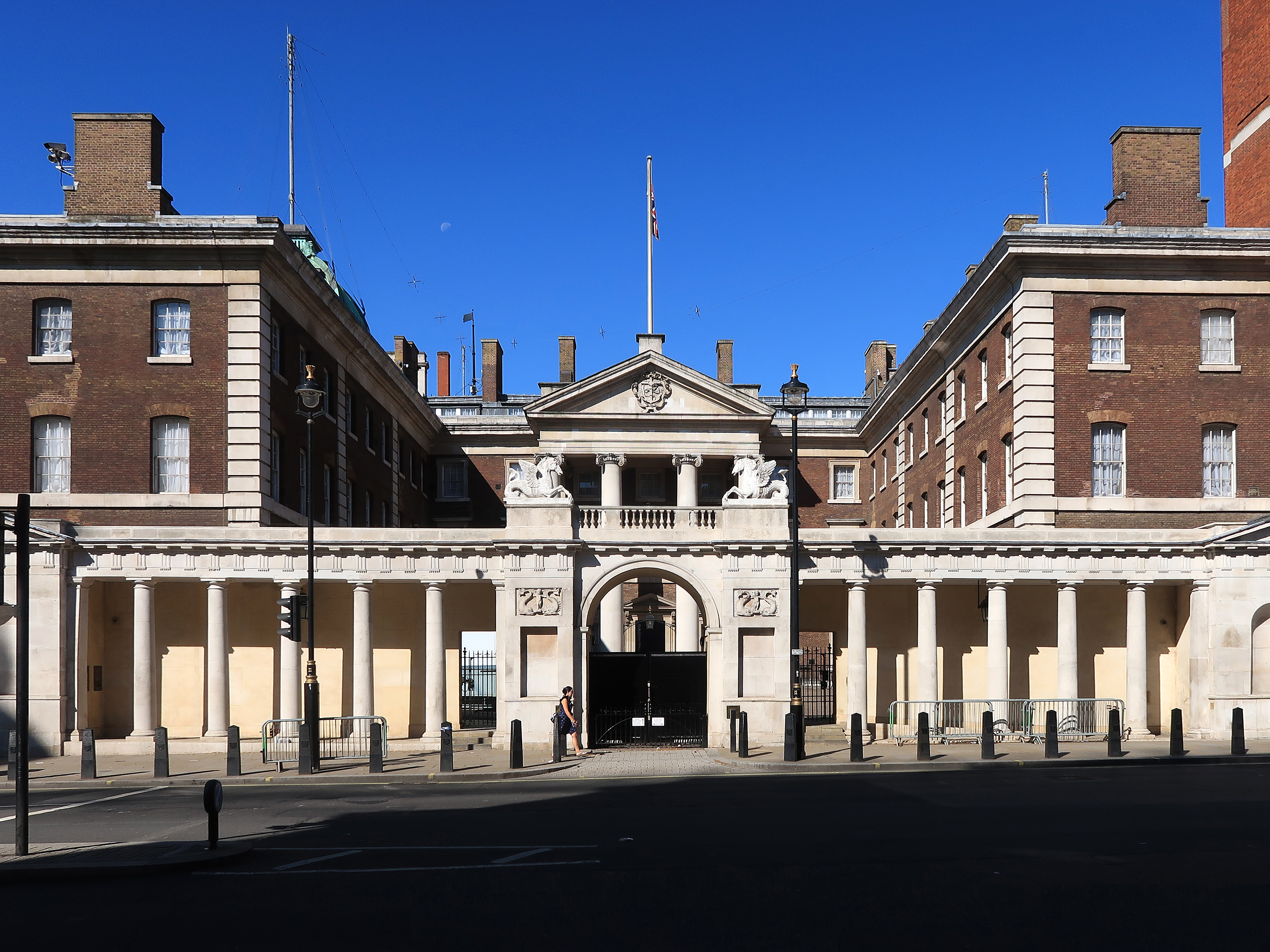
The Admiralty, Whitehall

In 2024, Andrew Boyd wrote that the post convoy analysis by the Admiralty revealed that events had been dominated by chance and stormy weather. The exploitation of intelligence and the means of communication when atmospheric conditions made wireless communication difficult and Tovey complained about Admiralty meddling and lack of clarity in the intelligence provided to him. Boyd wrote that Tovey had underestimated the difficulties the Admiralty staff were in when wireless silence left the Admiralty ignorant of the position of the Home Fleet and attempts to communicate were made more difficult because of problems with reception in the Arctic. The staff did manage to convince the operations staff of the danger Tirpitz posed to the convoy and got it diverted to the north on 8 March.

=== SKL ===
In 1954, the author of the naval staff history, Lewis Pitcairn-Jones wrote that the analysis of SKL in Berlin arrived at similar conclusions to the British about Tirpitz and it was three months before is sailed against another convoy, hamstrung by fighting instructions so restrictive that it was hardly likely that it would achieve anything. SKL thought that it was by good luck rather than judgement that Tirpitz had escaped unscathed from the British torpedo-bombers and submarines. Ciliax took the view that one big ship operating in waters dominated by the Home Fleet offered few prospects for success and great risk. Raeder noted that the lack of an aircraft carrier and the inadequate number of aircraft made him wonder if any operation against a convoy could be conducted and still maintain the defence against an invasion. Great caution was necessary if the anti-invasion priority was to be upheld at all. Hitler knew that the supplies delivered by the Arctic convoys were having an effect on the Eastern Front and wanted reinforcements for Luftflotte 5, an intensification of the U-boat offensive and the completion of the first German aircraft carrier, Graf Zeppelin to be expedited. The Kriegsmarine found itself with paradoxical objectives, to stand ready to defeat an invasion attempt and make a maximum effort against the convoys. SKL decided that Tirpitz would be kept ready for an invasion and the other ships, the destroyers in particular, would attack convoys.

In 2024, Andrew Boyd wrote that the events of Convoy PQ 12 made plain the maritime and aviation inadequacy of the Germans in Norway. The British could oppose every German effort with far more powerful forces including aircraft carriers, the most potent naval weapons. The British had been able to close on the Norwegian coast and lack of destroyer escorts meant that the big Germans hips were deprived of protection against attack on sea and in the air. MGK Nord had delivered a "damning assessment" that the Luftwaffe in Norway was not even "roughly up to requirements" and had led to

....the grotesque picture of the enemy chasing us in out own coastal waters, while himself sailing there unchallenged.

Ciliax criticised the naval operation for being amateurish in planning and execution, considering it pointless to sail an un-escorted battleship into waters dominated by the enemy. SKL acknowledged that the Royal Navy kept wireless silence, maintained air reconnaissance and the torpedo attack on Tirpitz was efficiently executed, that submarine surveillance was good and that the system of command was effective, allowing combined operations. More aircraft were necessary if the Kriegsmarine was to prevail against an invasion attempt or on a convoy operation and proposed a utopian fleet of two battleships, an aircraft carrier, two heavy cruisers and twelve destroyers, meaningless without the resources to create it.

=== Casualties ===
No merchant ships were sunk but the escort suffered the loss of a whaler, Shera, capsized by ice on the superstructure during a storm, with the loss of all but three of the crew. Oribi was damaged in the bow by pack ice.

=== Subsequent events ===
On 24 March, Lancaster Castle was dive-bombed while at the quay in Murmansk and ten men were killed. The ship was towed out and moored in the river, the crew remaining on board. A few days later it was dive-bombed again and received five hits, there were no casualties but the crew moved to shore. Convoy PQ 12 provided valuable military equipment and other materials for the Soviet war effort. The distribution of equipment and supplies delivered with the convoy was the subject of a Soviet State Defence Committee decree.

== Allied order of battle ==
=== Merchant ships ===
Ships convoyed (Note: Convoys had a standard formation of short columns, number 1 to port in the direction of travel. Each position in the column was numbered; position number 11 was the first ship in column 1, 12 was the second ship in the column; position number 21 was the first ship in column 2.)
Name	Year	Flag	GRT	No.	Notes
SS Artigas	1920	Panama	5,613	12	
SS Ballot	1922	Panama	6,131	41	Did not sail, dynamo defects
SS Bateau	1926	Panama	4,687	23	Turned back
SS Beaconstreet	1927	Merchant Navy	7,467	32	
SS Belomorcanal	1936	Soviet Union	2,900	43	
SS Capulin	1920	Panama	4,977	52	
SS Dneprostroi	1919	Soviet Union	4,756	42	
SS Earlston	1941	Merchant Navy	7,195	53	
SS El Coston	1924	Panama	7,286	33	
SS El Occidente	1910	Panama	6,008	22	
SS Empire Byron	1941	Merchant Navy	6,645	51	Vice-Convoy Commodore
SS Kiev	1917	Soviet Union	5,823	13	
SS Lancaster Castle	1937	Merchant Navy	5,172	63	Sunk Luftwaffe, Murmansk, 9† 48 surv
SS Llandaff	1937	Merchant Navy	4,825	31	Convoy commodore Captain Hubert Hudson
SS Navarino	1937	Merchant Navy	4,825	21	Rear-Convoy Commodore
SS Sevzaples	1932	Soviet Union	3,974	62	
SS Stone Street	1922	Panama	6,131	11	
SS Temple Arch	1940	Merchant Navy	5,138	61	

=== Convoy escorts ===
Convoy escorts (in relays)
Name	Flag	Type	Notes
Western local escorts
HMT Angle	Royal Navy	ASW trawler	1–4 March 1942
HMT Chiltern	Royal Navy	ASW trawler	1–4 March 1942
HMT Notts County	Royal Navy	ASW trawler	1–4 March 1942
HMT Stella Capella	Royal Navy	ASW trawler	1–4 March 1942
Close cover
HMS Kenya	Royal Navy	Crown Colony-class cruiser	Detached to convoy 6–12 March 1942
HMS Offa	Royal Navy	O-class destroyer	4–12 March 1942
HMS Oribi	Royal Navy	O-class destroyer	4–10 March 1942
HMS Shera	Royal Navy	ASW whaler	4–9 March 1942 capsized in storm, 3 survivors
HMS Shusa	Royal Navy	ASW whaler	4–12 March 1942
HMS Stefa	Royal Navy	ASW whaler	4–6 March 1942, lost contact (Note: Joined Sevzaples 10 March, shot down aircraft on 12 March.)
HMS Sulla	Royal Navy	ASW whaler	4–12 March 1942
HMS Svega	Royal Navy	ASW whaler	4–11 March 1942, arrived independently
Distant cover
HMS Duke of York	Royal Navy	King George V-class battleship	6–10 March 1942
HMS Renown	Royal Navy	Renown-class battlecruiser	6–10 March 1942
HMS Punjabi	Royal Navy	Tribal-class destroyer	6–11 March 1942, 11–12 March sortied against Tirpitz
HMS Tartar	Royal Navy	Tribal-class destroyer	9–10 March 1942, 11–12 March sortied against Tirpitz
HMS Echo	Royal Navy	E-class destroyer	6–10 March 1942
HMS Eclipse	Royal Navy	E-class destroyer	6–10 March 1942
HMS Eskimo	Royal Navy	E-class destroyer	6–10 March 1942, 11–12 March sortied against Tirpitz
HMS Faulknor	Royal Navy	F-class destroyer	6–10 March 1942, 11–12 March sortied against Tirpitz
HMS Fury	Royal Navy	F-class destroyer	6–11 March 1942, 11–12 March sortied against Tirpitz
HMS Inconstant	Royal Navy	I-class destroyer	10 March 1942
HMS Javelin	Royal Navy	J-class destroyer	10 March 1942
HMS Lancaster	Royal Navy	Town-class destroyer	10 March 1942
HMS Wells	Royal Navy	Town-class destroyer	10 March 1942
HMS Verdun	Royal Navy	V-class destroyer	10 March 1942
HMS Woolston	Royal Navy	W-class destroyer	10 March 1942
HMS Grove	Royal Navy	Hunt-class destroyer	10 March 1942
HMS Ledbury	Royal Navy	Hunt-class destroyer	10 March 1942
Home Fleet
HMS King George V	Royal Navy	King George V-class battleship	6–10 March 1942
HMS Victorious	Royal Navy	Illustrious-class aircraft carrier	6–10 March 1942
HMS Berwick	Royal Navy	County-class cruiser	6–10 March 1942
HMS Ashanti	Royal Navy	Tribal-class destroyer	6–10 March 1942
HMS Bedouin	Royal Navy	Tribal-class destroyer	6–10 March 1942, 11–12 March sortied against Tirpitz
HMS Icarus	Royal Navy	I-class destroyer	6–11 March 1942, 11–12 March sortied against Tirpitz
HMS Intrepid	Royal Navy	I-class destroyer	6–11 March 1942, 11–12 March sortied against Tirpitz
HMS Lookout	Royal Navy	L-class destroyer	6–11 March 1942
HMS Onslow	Royal Navy	O-class destroyer	6–10 March 1942
Eastern local escort
Gremyashchiy	Soviet Navy	Gnevny-class destroyer	11–12 March 1942
HMS Gossamer	Royal Navy	Halcyon-class minesweeper	4–10 March 1942
HMS Harrier	Royal Navy	Halcyon-class minesweeper	11–12 March 1942
HMS Hussar	Royal Navy	Halcyon-class minesweeper	11–12 March 1942
HMS Speedwell	Royal Navy	Halcyon-class minesweeper	11–12 March 1942
Allied submarines
HMS Sealion	Royal Navy	S-class submarine	
HMS Seawolf	Royal Navy	S-class submarine	
HMS Trident	Royal Navy	Triton-class submarine	
HNoMS Uredd	Royal Norwegian Navy	U-class submarine	
Junon	Free French Naval Forces	Minerve-class submarine	
D-3	Soviet Navy	Dekabrist-class submarine	South flank convoy cover
K-21	Soviet Navy	Soviet K-class submarine	South flank convoy cover
K-23	Soviet Navy	Soviet K-class submarine	South flank convoy cover
S-102	Soviet Navy	Soviet S-class submarine	South flank convoy cover
Shch-403	Soviet Navy	Shchuka-class submarine	South flank convoy cover
Shch-422	Soviet Navy	Shchuka-class submarine	South flank convoy cover

== German order of battle ==
=== Kriegsmarine ===
U-boats and ships
Name	Flag	Class	Notes
U-boats
U-134	Kriegsmarine	Type VIIC submarine	
U-377	Kriegsmarine	Type VIIC submarine	
U-403	Kriegsmarine	Type VIIC submarine	
U-584	Kriegsmarine	Type VIIC submarine	
Ships
Tirpitz	Kriegsmarine	Bismarck-class battleship	
Z5 Paul Jacobi	Kriegsmarine	Type 1934A-class destroyer	
Z7 Hermann Schoemann	Kriegsmarine	Type 1934A-class destroyer	
Z14 Friedrich Ihn	Kriegsmarine	Type 1934A-class destroyer	
Z25	Kriegsmarine	Type 1936A-class destroyer	

== Bibliography ==
- Boog, H.; Rahn, W.; Stumpf, R.; Wegner, B. (2001). The Global War: Widening of the Conflict into a World War and the Shift of the Initiative 1941–1943. Germany in the Second World War. Vol. VI. Translated by Osers, E.; Brownjohn, J.; Crampton, P.; Willmot, L. (Eng trans. Oxford University Press, London ed.). Potsdam: Militärgeschichtliches Forschungsamt (Research Institute for Military History). ISBN 0-19-822888-0.
  - Rahn, W. "Part III. The War at Sea in the Atlantic and in the Arctic Ocean. III. The Conduct of the War in the Atlantic and the Coastal Area (b) The Third Phase, April–December 1941: The Extension of the Areas of Operations". In Boog et al. (2001).
- Boyd, Andrew (2024). Arms for Russia & the Naval War in the Arctic 1941–1945. Barnsley: Seaforth (Pen & Sword). ISBN 978-1-3990-3886-7.
- Budiansky, S. (2000). Battle of Wits: The Complete Story of Codebreaking in World War II. New York: The Free Press (Simon & Schuster). ISBN 0-684-85932-7 – via Archive Foundation.
- Claasen, A. R. A. (2001). Hitler's Northern War: The Luftwaffe's Ill-fated Campaign, 1940–1945. Lawrence, KS: University Press of Kansas. ISBN 0-7006-1050-2.
- Hague, Arnold (2000). The Allied Convoy System 1939–1945. London: Chatham. ISBN 978-1-55125-033-5.
- Hancock, W. K.; Gowing, M. M. (1949). Hancock, W. K. (ed.). British War Economy. History of the Second World War, United Kingdom Civil Series. London: HMSO. OCLC 630191560.
- Hill, Alexander (2006). "The Allocation of Allied "Lend-Lease" Aid to the Soviet Union arriving with Convoy PQ 12, March 1942 – A State Defense Committee Decree". The Journal of Slavic Military Studies. 19 (4). Philadelphia, PA: Taylor and Francis. doi:10.1080/13518040601028545. ISSN 1351-8046. S2CID 144712146.
- Hinsley, F. H.; et al. (1981). British Intelligence in the Second World War: Its Influence on Strategy and Operations. History of the Second World War. Vol. II. London: HMSO. ISBN 978-0-11-630934-1.
- Hinsley, F. H. (1994) [1993]. British Intelligence in the Second World War: Its Influence on Strategy and Operations. History of the Second World War, United Kingdom Military Series (2nd rev. abr. ed.). London: HMSO. ISBN 978-0-11-630961-7.
- Jordan, Roger W. (2006) [1999]. The World's Merchant Fleets 1939: The Particulars and Wartime Fates of 6,000 Ships (2nd ed.). London: Chatham/Lionel Leventhal. ISBN 978-1-86176-293-1.
- Kahn, D. (1973) [1967]. The Codebreakers: The Story of Secret Writing (10th abr. Signet, Chicago ed.). New York: Macmillan. LCCN 63-16109. OCLC 78083316.
- Kindell, Don (2025). "Convoy PQ.12". Arnold Hague Convoy Database.
- Macksey, K. (2004) [2003]. The Searchers: Radio Intercept in two World Wars (Cassell Military Paperbacks ed.). London: Cassell. ISBN 978-0-304-36651-4.
- Paterson, Lawrence (2016). Steel and Ice: The U-boat Battle in the Arctic and Black Sea 1941–45. Stroud: The History Press. ISBN 978-1-59114-258-4.
- Pitcairn-Jones, Lewis (2014) [1954]. Llewellyn-Jones, Malcolm (ed.). The Royal Navy and the Arctic Convoys: A Naval Staff History. Naval Staff Histories. London: Whitehall Publishing in association with Routledge. ISBN 978-0-415-86177-9.
- Rohwer, Jürgen; Hümmelchen, Gerhard (2005) [1972]. Chronology of the War at Sea, 1939–1945: The Naval History of World War Two (3rd rev. ed.). London: Chatham. ISBN 978-1-86176-257-3.
- Roskill, S. W. (1957) [1954]. Butler, J. R. M. (ed.). The War at Sea 1939–1945: The Defensive. History of the Second World War United Kingdom Military Series. Vol. I (4th impr. ed.). London: HMSO. OCLC 881709135. Archived from the original on 27 February 2022.
- Ruegg, R.; Hague, A. (1993) [1992]. Convoys to Russia: Allied Convoys and Naval Surface Operations in Arctic Waters 1941–1945 (2nd rev. enl. ed.). Kendal: World Ship Society. ISBN 0-905617-66-5.
- Smith, William (2023). Allied Convoys to North Russia 1941–1945: Politics, Strategy and Tactics. Barnsley and Philadelphia: Pen & Sword Maritime. ISBN 978-1-39905-473-7.
- Woodman, Richard (1994). Arctic Convoys 1941–1945 (hbk. ed.). London: John Murray. ISBN 0-7195-5079-3.
- Woodman, Richard (2004) [1994]. Arctic Convoys 1941–1945. London: John Murray. ISBN 978-0-7195-5752-1.
- Ziemke, Earl F. (1959). The German Northern Theatre of Operations, 1940–1945. Washington, DC: Headquarters, United States Department of the Army. OCLC 610363660. 20-271.
