= K51 =

K-51 or K51 may refer to:

- K-51 (Kansas highway)
- HMS Rockrose (K51), a corvette of the Royal Navy
- Junkers K 51, a German aircraft design study
- La finta semplice, by Wolfgang Amadeus Mozart
- Potassium-51, an isotope of potassium
- Russian submarine Verkhoturye (K-51)
- Soviet submarine K-51
- Toyota K51 transmission
