= Soviet submarine K-3 (1938) =

- Profile drawing of the class

History

Soviet Union
- Name: K-3
- Builder: Zavod No. 194, Leningrad
- Laid down: 27 December 1936
- Launched: 31 July 1938
- Completed: 27 November 1940
- Commissioned: 19 December 1940
- Fate: Sunk around 21 March 1943

General characteristics
- Class & type: Soviet K-class submarine
- Displacement: 1,490 t (1,470 long tons) (surfaced); 2,104 t (2,071 long tons) (submerged)
- Length: 97.7 m (320 ft 6 in) (o/a)
- Beam: 7.4 m (24 ft 3 in)
- Draught: 4.5 m (14 ft 9 in) (full load)
- Installed power: 8,400 PS (6,200 kW) (diesel); 2,400 PS (1,800 kW) (electric)
- Propulsion: 2-shaft diesel electric
- Speed: 21 knots (39 km/h; 24 mph) (surfaced); 10.3 knots (19.1 km/h; 11.9 mph) (submerged)
- Range: 7,500 nmi (13,900 km; 8,600 mi) at 10.3 knots (19.1 km/h; 11.9 mph) (surfaced); 176 nmi (326 km; 203 mi) at 3.1 knots (5.7 km/h; 3.6 mph) (submerged)
- Test depth: 80 m (260 ft)
- Complement: 66
- Sensors & processing systems: Tamir-51 sonar
- Armament: 6 × bow 533 mm (21 in) torpedo tubes; 4 × stern 533 mm (21 in) torpedo tubes (2 internal, 2 external); 2 × 100 mm (3.9 in) deck guns; 2 × 45 mm (1.8 in) deck guns; 20 × mines

K-3 was one of a dozen double-hulled K-class submarine cruisers built for the Soviet Navy during the late 1930s. Commissioned in 1940 into the Baltic Fleet, the boat was initially used for tests. After the Axis powers invaded the Soviet Union in June 1941 (Operation Barbarossa), she made one war patrol before being transferred to the Northern Fleet. There K-3 made nine more patrols, including one minelaying mission. She failed to return from her patrol in March 1943, possibly sunk by German submarine chasers or hitting a mine.

== Design and description ==
Despite the unsuccessful Pravda class built in the early 1930s, the Soviet Navy still dreamed of cruiser submarines capable of attacking enemy ships far from Soviet territory. In 1936 it received approval to build them with the addition of minelaying capability (Project 41). The boats displaced 1,490 metric tons (1,470 long tons) surfaced and 2,104 t (2,071 long tons) submerged. They had an overall length of 97.7 meters (321 ft), a beam of 7.4 meters (24 ft 3 in), and a draft of 4.5 meters (15 ft) at full load. The boats had a maximum operating depth of 80 m (260 ft). Their crew numbered 66 officers and crewmen.

For surface running, the K-class boats were powered by a pair of 9DKR diesel engines, one per propeller shaft. The engines produced a total of 8,400 metric horsepower (6,178 kW), enough to give them a speed of 21 knots (39 km/h; 24 mph). When submerged each shaft was driven by a PG11 1,200-metric-horsepower (883 kW) electric motor for 10.3 knots (19.1 km/h; 11.9 mph). The boats had a surface endurance of 7,500 nautical miles (13,900 km; 8,600 mi) at 10.3 knots (19.1 km/h; 11.9 mph) and 176 nmi (326 km; 203 mi) at 3.1 knots (5.7 km/h; 3.6 mph) submerged.

They were armed with six 533-millimeter (21 in) torpedo tubes in the bow and four were in the stern, two internal and two external. They carried a dozen reloads. A dual-purpose minelaying/ballast tank was located under the conning tower that housed 20 chutes for EP-36 mines which also served as outlets for the ballast tank's Kingston valves. This arrangement proved problematic as this was the location of the greatest structural loads in the hull and the mines were sometimes pinched in the chutes as the hull flexed. Another issue was that the chutes would sometimes jam when debris was drawn in with ballast water. The boats were also equipped with a pair of 100-millimeter (3.9 in) B-24PL deck guns fore and aft on the conning tower and a pair of 45-millimeter (2 in) 21-K guns above them.

== Construction and career ==
K-3 was laid down on 27 December 1936 by Zavod No. 194 in Leningrad, launched on 31 July 1938, and completed on 27 November 1940. After she was commissioned into the Baltic Fleet on 19 December, the boat was used for trials until the invasion. The submarine attempted to lay a minefield off Bornholm Island on 26 July, but had to abort the mission due to technical difficulties. She departed Leningrad for Belomorsk via the White Sea–Baltic Canal on 21 August. K-3 arrived on 9 September and joined the Northern Fleet. The submarine was transferred to Molotovsk (now Severodvinsk) on 25 September and later to Polyarny.

On 23 November K-3 laid two small minefields off Hammerfest, Occupied Norway, and attacked a Norwegian fishing trawler with her guns two days later, wounding seven crewmen. On 3 December, after a failed torpedo attack, the submarine was damaged by depth charges from the German submarine chasers UJ-1403, UJ-1416, and UJ-1708. K-3 was forced to surface and engaged in a gun battle with the three German ships, sinking UJ-1708 and forcing the other two ships to withdraw. The submarine was one of five boats tasked to screen the southern flank of Convoys QP 10 and PQ 14 in March-April 1942. K-3 made uneventful patrols in November 1942 and early January 1943; later that month the boat screened Convoy JW 52. The boat and her sister K-22 made a coordinated attack for the first time on two German submarine chasers on 5 February; K-3 sank UJ-1108, but impeded K-22's attack. The boat made a total of nine war patrols in the Arctic. K-3 was sunk on 21 March by depth charges from the German submarine chasers UJ-1102, UJ-1106, and UJ-1111, or possibly by a mine in the Porsangerfjorden

== Claims ==
Ships sunk by K-3
Date	Ship	Flag	Tonnage	Notes
3 December 1941	UJ-1708	(Nazi Germany)	470 GRT	Submarine chaser (artillery)
30 January 1942	Ingøy	(Norway)	327 GRT	Freighter (mine)
9 July 1942	UJ-1110	(Nazi Germany)	527 GRT	Submarine chaser (mine) (also claimed by K-21)
5 February 1943	UJ-1108	(Nazi Germany)	462 GRT	Submarine chaser (torpedo)
12 February 1943	Fechenheim	(Nazi Germany)	8,116 GRT	Freighter (mine) (damaged beyond repair)
Total:			9,902 GRT	

== Bibliography ==
- Budzbon, Przemysław; Radziemski, Jan & Twardowski, Marek (2022). Warships of the Soviet Fleets 1939–1945. Vol. I: Major Combatants. Annapolis, Maryland: Naval Institute Press. ISBN 978-1-68247-877-6.
- Polmar, Norman & Noot, Jurrien (1991). Submarines of the Russian and Soviet Navies, 1718–1990. Annapolis, Maryland: Naval Institute Press. ISBN 0-87021-570-1.
- Rohwer, Jürgen (2005). Chronology of the War at Sea 1939–1945: The Naval History of World War Two (Third Revised ed.). Annapolis, Maryland: Naval Institute Press. ISBN 1-59114-119-2.
