= Soviet submarine K-56 (1965) =

Soviet nuclear submarine of Cold War era

History

Soviet Union
- Name: K-56
- Builder: Amur Shipbuilding Plant
- Laid down: 30 May 1964
- Launched: 10 August 1965
- Commissioned: 26 August 1966
- Decommissioned: 1992
- Fate: Scrapped

General characteristics
- Class & type: Echo-class submarine
- Displacement: 5,000 long tons (5,080 t) surfaced; 6,000 long tons (6,096 t) submerged
- Length: 115 m (377 ft 4 in)
- Beam: 9 m (29 ft 6 in)
- Draught: 7.5 m (24 ft 7 in)
- Propulsion: 2 × pressurized water nuclear reactors, 30,000 shp (22,400 kW) turbines, two shafts
- Speed: 20 knots (37 km/h; 23 mph) surfaced; 23 knots (43 km/h; 26 mph) submerged
- Complement: about 90 officers and men
- Armament: 8 × SS-N-3 "Shaddock" cruise missiles; 6 × 21 in (533 mm) torpedo tubes forward; 4 × 16 in (406 mm) torpedo tubes aft

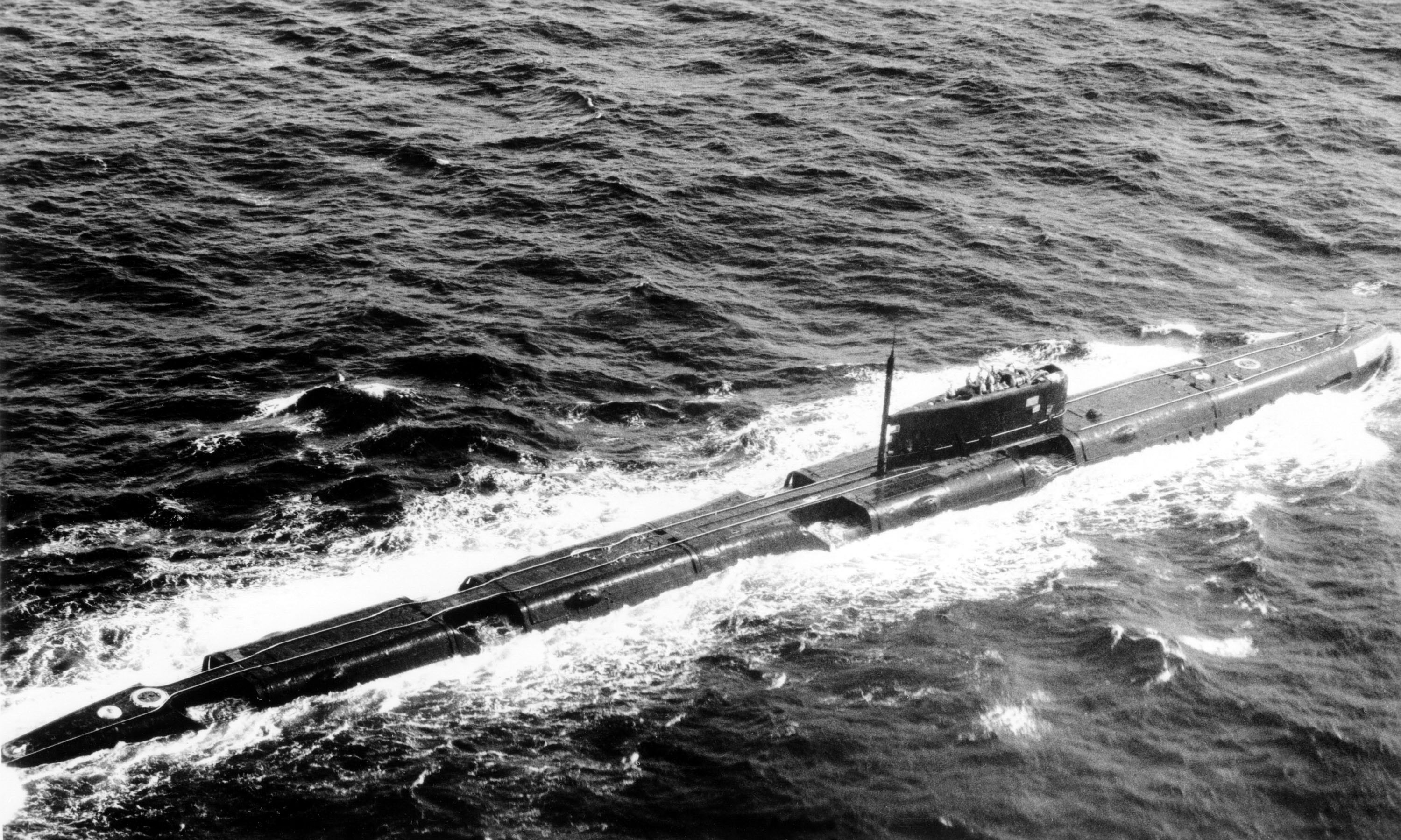
A starboard view of a Soviet Echo II class guided missile submarine underway on the surface.

K-56 was a Project 675 (also known by the NATO reporting name of Echo II class) nuclear submarine of the Soviet Navy.

Her keel was laid down by the Amur Shipbuilding Plant in Komsomolsk-on-Amur under the plant number 177. She was commissioned into the Soviet Pacific Fleet.

== Collision incident ==
On 13 June 1973, K-56 had completed test launches of her SS-N-3 Shaddock missiles in the Sea of Japan and was returning to port accompanied by the Kresta I-class cruiser Vladivostok. She was carrying observers on board, including her Division Commander, Captain First Rank L.F. Suchkov, civilian technicians from Leningrad, and a team from her sister boat, K-23, that included her commanding officer, Captain Second Rank L. Homenko. These 36 guests were housed in the second compartment.

At approximately 01:00, the boat, running on the surface, rounded Cape Povorotny in Peter the Great Gulf. The navigation crew noted a surface contact on radar about 75 kilometres (40 nmi; 47 mi) ahead, moving toward them at 9 knots (17 km/h; 10 mph). Since that was the only contact, and it would be about two hours before the submarine and the contact's combined speeds would bring them near each other, the captain felt no concern.

The boat's RLS "Albatross" radar set had been used at full power throughout the day for the missile launches and now needed maintenance, which required that it be placed in "hot standby." The captain gave permission for the radar to be secured, and relied on the lookouts to spot any hazards.

Two hours later, the radar was re-energized and four contacts were immediately detected. The operators became confused, attempting to plot courses for the contacts. Three minutes after the radar came on, lookouts spotted a ship's navigational lights. The bridge ordered evasive action, but two minutes later, the research ship Academician Berg, traveling at 9 knots (17 km/h; 10 mph), struck K-56 on the starboard side, tearing a four-meter hole through the hull into the first and second compartments.

As the second compartment rapidly flooded, the officers within shut the watertight doors to prevent flooding the adjacent compartments. When the seawater flooded the battery well, many of the officers and civilians in the second compartment were killed by chlorine gas.

The 22 sailors in the first compartment were able to fight the flooding and retain a pocket of air until K-56's captain ran his boat aground on a sandbar.

The next day, salvage ships lifted K-56 from the sand bar onto pontoons, and towed her to dock.

The investigating board ruled that the collision of Academician Berg with K-56 was a "navigation incident with serious consequences."

A civilian expert from Leningrad, 16 officers, five warrant officers, and five sailors were killed.

== Bibliography ==
- Polmar, Norman & Noot, Jurrien (1991). Submarines of the Russian and Soviet Navies, 1718–1990. Annapolis, Maryland: Naval Institute Press. ISBN 0-87021-570-1.
- Vilches Alarcón, Alejandro A. (2022). From Juliettes to Yasens: Development and Operational History of Soviet Cruise-Missile Submarines. Europe @ War (22). Warwick, UK: Helion & Co. ISBN 978-1-915070-68-5.
