= Soviet submarine K-51 =

- Profile drawing of the class

History

Soviet Union
- Name: K-51
- Builder: Zavod No. 190, Leningrad
- Laid down: 28 February 1938
- Launched: 30 July 1939
- Completed: 17 November 1943
- Commissioned: 20 December 1943
- Renamed: PZS-24, 1956; ZAS-1, 1956; UTS-30, 1958
- Reclassified: Battery-charging ship, 1956; Training ship, 1958
- Fate: Scrapped, 13 March 1975

General characteristics
- Class & type: Soviet K-class submarine
- Displacement: 1,490 t (1,470 long tons) (surfaced); 2,104 t (2,071 long tons) (submerged)
- Length: 97.7 m (320 ft 6 in) (o/a)
- Beam: 7.4 m (24 ft 3 in)
- Draught: 4.5 m (14 ft 9 in) (full load)
- Installed power: 8,400 PS (6,200 kW) (diesel); 2,400 PS (1,800 kW) (electric)
- Propulsion: 2-shaft diesel electric
- Speed: 21 knots (39 km/h; 24 mph) (surfaced); 10.3 knots (19.1 km/h; 11.9 mph) (submerged)
- Range: 7,500 nmi (13,900 km; 8,600 mi) at 10.3 knots (19.1 km/h; 11.9 mph) (surfaced); 176 nmi (326 km; 203 mi) at 3.1 knots (5.7 km/h; 3.6 mph) (submerged)
- Test depth: 80 m (260 ft)
- Complement: 66
- Sensors & processing systems: Tamir-51 sonar
- Armament: 6 × bow 533 mm (21 in) torpedo tubes; 4 × stern 533 mm (21 in) torpedo tubes (2 internal, 2 external); 2 × 100 mm (3.9 in) deck guns; 2 × 45 mm (1.8 in) deck guns; 20 × mines

K-51 was one of a dozen double-hulled K-class submarine cruisers built for the Soviet Navy during the late 1930s. The submarine's construction was interrupted by the Axis powers' invasion of the Soviet Union in June 1941 (Operation Barbarossa) and the subsequent Siege of Leningrad, but she was provisionally commissioned later that year into the Baltic Fleet. Damaged by ice in December 1941, the boat did not become operational until three years later. K-51 made two war patrols.

The submarine was transferred to the Northern Fleet in 1948 and was renamed B-5 the following year. She was modified in the early 1950s to serve as a test ship for an experimental cruise missile, but the program was canceled in 1953 and the ship was not rebuilt. K-51 was relegated to auxiliary duties in 1955 and was stricken from the navy list in 1975 and subsequently scrapped.

== Design and description ==
Despite the unsuccessful Pravda class built in the early 1930s, the Soviet Navy still dreamed of cruiser submarines capable of attacking enemy ships far from Soviet territory. In 1936 it received approval to build them with the addition of minelaying capability (Project 41). The boats displaced 1,490 metric tons (1,470 long tons) surfaced and 2,104 t (2,071 long tons) submerged. They had an overall length of 97.7 meters (321 ft), a beam of 7.4 meters (24 ft 3 in), and a draft of 4.5 meters (15 ft) at full load. The boats had a maximum operating depth of 80 m (260 ft). Their crew numbered 66 officers and crewmen.

For surface running, the K-class boats were powered by a pair of 9DKR diesel engines, one per propeller shaft. The engines produced a total of 8,400 metric horsepower (6,178 kW), enough to give them a speed of 21 knots (39 km/h; 24 mph). When submerged each shaft was driven by a PG11 1,200-metric-horsepower (883 kW) electric motor for 10.3 knots (19.1 km/h; 11.9 mph). The boats had a surface endurance of 7,500 nautical miles (13,900 km; 8,600 mi) at 10.3 knots (19.1 km/h; 11.9 mph) and 176 nmi (326 km; 203 mi) at 3.1 knots (5.7 km/h; 3.6 mph) submerged.

They were armed with six 533-millimeter (21 in) torpedo tubes in the bow and four were in the stern, two internal and two external. They carried a dozen reloads. A dual-purpose minelaying/ballast tank was located under the conning tower that housed 20 chutes for EP-36 mines which also served as outlets for the ballast tank's Kingston valves. This arrangement proved problematic as this was the location of the greatest structural loads in the hull and the mines were sometimes pinched in the chutes as the hull flexed. Another issue was that the chutes would sometimes jam when debris was drawn in with ballast water. The boats were also equipped with a pair of 100-millimeter (3.9 in) B-24PL deck guns fore and aft on the conning tower and a pair of 45-millimeter (2 in) 21-K guns above them.

== Construction and career ==
K-51 was laid down on 28 February 1938 by Zavod No. 194 in Leningrad and launched on 30 July 1939. When the Axis Powers invaded on 22 June, the submarine was 88 percent complete as she was expected to be completed in September. She was provisionally commissioned into the Baltic Fleet without the customary acceptance trials on 17 September. K-51 was damaged by ice on 22 December as she was being prepared for a lengthy patrol as a replacement for the damaged K-52. She was damaged by German aircraft on 24 April 1942. The boat was recommissioned on 17 November 1943, but was not fully operational until November 1944.

K-51 made seven torpedo attacks and two artillery attacks, all unsuccessful, between 27 November and 1 December in the south-eastern part of the Baltic Sea during her first patrol. The boat began another patrol in January 1945, sinking a small Danish freighter on 28 January, but missed another freighter on 6 February despite making two attacks.

She was transferred to the Northern Fleet in August 1948 and was renamed B-5 the following year. The submarine was modified to serve as the test ship for the 10KhN cruise missile in the early 1950s, a copy of the German V-1 missile. The program was canceled in February 1953 and the ship was not rebuilt. B-5 was disarmed and relegated to auxiliary duties on 29 December 1955. She briefly served as a battery-charging ship in 1956 with the name of PZS-24 and was renamed ZAS-1 later the same year. The boat became a training ship in 1958 with the name of UTS-30. The submarine was stricken on 13 March 1975 and turned over to be scrapped that same day.

== Claims ==
Ships sunk by K-51
Date	Ship	Flag	Tonnage	Notes
28 November 1944	Sollind	(Nazi Germany)	260 GRT	Fishing boat (artillery)
1 December 1944	Saar	(Nazi Germany)	235 GRT	Fishing boat (artillery)
12 January 1945	Ib	(Sweden)	15 GRT	Fishing boat (artillery)
28 January 1945	Viborg	(Denmark)	2028 GRT	Merchant ship (torpedo)
Total:			2,538 GRT	

== Bibliography ==
- Budzbon, Przemysław; Radziemski, Jan & Twardowski, Marek (2022). Warships of the Soviet Fleets 1939–1945. Vol. I: Major Combatants. Annapolis, Maryland: Naval Institute Press. ISBN 978-1-68247-877-6.
- Polmar, Norman & Noot, Jurrien (1991). Submarines of the Russian and Soviet Navies, 1718–1990. Annapolis, Maryland: Naval Institute Press. ISBN 0-87021-570-1.
- Rohwer, Jürgen (2005). Chronology of the War at Sea 1939–1945: The Naval History of World War Two (Third Revised ed.). Annapolis, Maryland: Naval Institute Press. ISBN 1-59114-119-2.
