= K55 =

K55 or K-55 may refer to:

- K-55 (Kansas highway)
- K-55 (missile), a Soviet air-to-air missile
- K55 howitzer, a South Korean self-propelled gun
- HMS Periwinkle (K55), a corvette of the Royal Navy
- Keystone K-55 Pronto, an American biplane
- Osan Air Base, in South Korea
- Potassium-55, an isotope of potassium
- Soviet submarine K-55, various vessels
- K-55, a Billiard table profile
