= Soviet submarine K-1 =

K-class submarine of the Soviet Navy during World War II

- Profile drawing of the class

History

Soviet Union
- Name: K-1
- Builder: Zavod No. 194, Leningrad
- Laid down: 27 December 1936
- Launched: 28 April 1938
- Completed: 16 December 1940
- Commissioned: 26 June 1940
- Fate: Missing after 5 September 1943

General characteristics
- Class & type: Soviet K-class submarine
- Displacement: 1,490 t (1,470 long tons) (surfaced); 2,104 t (2,071 long tons) (submerged)
- Length: 97.7 m (320 ft 6 in) (o/a)
- Beam: 7.4 m (24 ft 3 in)
- Draught: 4.5 m (14 ft 9 in) (full load)
- Installed power: 8,400 PS (6,200 kW) (diesel); 2,400 PS (1,800 kW) (electric)
- Propulsion: 2-shaft diesel electric
- Speed: 21 knots (39 km/h; 24 mph) (surfaced); 10.3 knots (19.1 km/h; 11.9 mph) (submerged)
- Range: 7,500 nmi (13,900 km; 8,600 mi) at 10.3 knots (19.1 km/h; 11.9 mph) (surfaced); 176 nmi (326 km; 203 mi) at 3.1 knots (5.7 km/h; 3.6 mph) (submerged)
- Test depth: 80 m (260 ft)
- Complement: 66
- Sensors & processing systems: Tamir-51 sonar
- Armament: 6 × bow 533 mm (21 in) torpedo tubes; 4 × stern 533 mm (21 in) torpedo tubes (2 internal, 2 external); 2 × 100 mm (3.9 in) deck guns; 2 × 45 mm (1.8 in) deck guns; 20 × mines

K-1 was the lead boat of her class of a dozen double-hulled cruiser submarines built for the Soviet Navy during the late 1930s. Although given a heavy torpedo armament, the boats could also lay mines. Commissioned in 1940, the boat was assigned to the Northern Fleet. During the Second World War, she made sixteen war patrols, including eight minelaying missions. K-1 never returned from her last patrol in September 1943, probably sunk by a mine laid by a German heavy cruiser.

== Design and description ==
Despite the unsuccessful Pravda class built in the early 1930s, the Soviet Navy still dreamed of cruiser submarines capable of attacking enemy ships far from Soviet territory. In 1936 it received approval to build them with the addition of minelaying capability (Project 41). The boats displaced 1,490 metric tons (1,470 long tons) surfaced and 2,104 t (2,071 long tons) submerged. They had an overall length of 97.7 meters (321 ft), a beam of 7.4 meters (24 ft 3 in), and a draft of 4.5 meters (15 ft) at full load. The boats had a maximum operating depth of 80 m (260 ft). Their crew numbered 66 officers and crewmen.

For surface running, the K-class boats were powered by a pair of 9DKR diesel engines, one per propeller shaft. The engines produced a total of 8,400 metric horsepower (6,178 kW), enough to give them a speed of 21 knots (39 km/h; 24 mph). When submerged each shaft was driven by a PG11 1,200-metric-horsepower (883 kW) electric motor for 10.3 knots (19.1 km/h; 11.9 mph). The boats had a surface endurance of 7,500 nautical miles (13,900 km; 8,600 mi) at 10.3 knots (19.1 km/h; 11.9 mph) and 176 nmi (326 km; 203 mi) at 3.1 knots (5.7 km/h; 3.6 mph) submerged.

They were armed with six 533-millimeter (21 in) torpedo tubes in the bow and four were in the stern, two internal and two external. They carried a dozen reloads. A dual-purpose minelaying/ballast tank was located under the conning tower that housed 20 chutes for EP-36 mines which also served as outlets for the ballast tank's Kingston valves. This arrangement proved problematic as this was the location of the greatest structural loads in the hull and the mines were sometimes pinched in the chutes as the hull flexed. Another issue was that the chutes would sometimes jam when debris was drawn in with ballast water. The boats were also equipped with a pair of 100-millimeter (3.9 in) B-24PL deck guns fore and aft on the conning tower and a pair of 45-millimeter (2 in) 21-K guns above them.

== Construction and career ==
K-1 was commissioned into the Baltic Fleet on 26 May 1940 and departed Leningrad for Polyarny via the White Sea–Baltic Canal on 23 June. She was commissioned into the Northern Fleet on 6 August. During the Great Patriotic War, the boat made 16 patrols, half of which were minelaying missions. K-1 was damaged by a mine on 11 August 1942, but managed to make port three days later. The submarine departed base on 5 September 1943 and was never heard or seen again, probably sunk by a mine laid by the Admiral Hipper.

== Claims ==
Ships sunk by K-1
Date	Ship	Flag	Tonnage	Notes
8 November 1941	Flottbeck	(Nazi Germany)	1,930 GRT	Freighter (mine)
26 December 1941	Kong Ring	(Norway)	1,994 GRT	Freighter (mine)
8 April 1942	Kurzsee	(Nazi Germany)	734 GRT	Freighter (mine)
23 May 1942	Asuncion	(Nazi Germany)	2,454 GRT	Freighter (mine)
12 September 1942	Robert Bornhofen	(Nazi Germany)	6,643 GRT	Freighter (mine)
6 December 1942	V-6116/Ubier	(Nazi Germany)	350 GRT	Patrol vessel (mine)
6 December 1942	V-6117/Cherusker	(Nazi Germany)	304 GRT	Patrol vessel (mine)
Total:			14,409 GRT	

== Bibliography ==
- Budzbon, Przemysław; Radziemski, Jan & Twardowski, Marek (2022). Warships of the Soviet Fleets 1939–1945. Vol. I: Major Combatants. Annapolis, Maryland: Naval Institute Press. ISBN 978-1-68247-877-6.
- Polmar, Norman & Noot, Jurrien (1991). Submarines of the Russian and Soviet Navies, 1718–1990. Annapolis, Maryland: Naval Institute Press. ISBN 0-87021-570-1.
- Rohwer, Jürgen (2005). Chronology of the War at Sea 1939–1945: The Naval History of World War Two (Third Revised ed.). Annapolis, Maryland: Naval Institute Press. ISBN 1-59114-119-2.
