= Soviet submarine K-23 =

K-class submarine from World War II

- Profile drawing of the class

History

Soviet Union
- Name: K-23
- Builder: Zavod No. 196, Leningrad
- Laid down: 5 February 1938
- Launched: 28 April 1939
- Completed: 25 September 1940
- Commissioned: 25 October 1940
- Fate: Sunk, 12 May 1942

General characteristics
- Class & type: Soviet K-class submarine
- Displacement: 1,490 t (1,470 long tons) (surfaced); 2,104 t (2,071 long tons) (submerged)
- Length: 97.7 m (320 ft 6 in) (o/a)
- Beam: 7.4 m (24 ft 3 in)
- Draught: 4.5 m (14 ft 9 in) (full load)
- Installed power: 8,400 PS (6,200 kW) (diesel); 2,400 PS (1,800 kW) (electric)
- Propulsion: 2-shaft diesel electric
- Speed: 21 knots (39 km/h; 24 mph) (surfaced); 10.3 knots (19.1 km/h; 11.9 mph) (submerged)
- Range: 7,500 nmi (13,900 km; 8,600 mi) at 10.3 knots (19.1 km/h; 11.9 mph) (surfaced); 176 nmi (326 km; 203 mi) at 3.1 knots (5.7 km/h; 3.6 mph) (submerged)
- Test depth: 80 m (260 ft)
- Complement: 66
- Sensors & processing systems: Tamir-51 sonar
- Armament: 6 × bow 533 mm (21 in) torpedo tubes; 4 × stern 533 mm (21 in) torpedo tubes (2 internal, 2 external); 2 × 100 mm (3.9 in) deck guns; 2 × 45 mm (1.8 in) deck guns; 20 × mines

K-23 was one of a dozen double-hulled K-class submarine cruisers built for the Soviet Navy during the late 1930s. Commissioned in 1940 into the Baltic Fleet, she did not make any war patrols after the Axis powers invaded the Soviet Union in June 1941 (Operation Barbarossa). The boat had already departed Leningrad before the invasion and was transferred to the Northern Fleet in September. K-23 made five war patrols, including three minelaying missions, before she was sunk by German submarine chasers in 1942.

== Design and description ==
Despite the unsuccessful Pravda class built in the early 1930s, the Soviet Navy still dreamed of cruiser submarines capable of attacking enemy ships far from Soviet territory. In 1936 it received approval to build them with the addition of minelaying capability. The boats displaced 1,490 metric tons (1,470 long tons) surfaced and 2,104 t (2,071 long tons) submerged. They had an overall length of 97.7 meters (321 ft), a beam of 7.4 meters (24 ft 3 in), and a draft of 4.5 meters (15 ft) at full load. The boats had a diving depth of 80 m (260 ft). Their crew numbered 66 officers and crewmen.

For surface running, the K-class boats were powered by a pair of 9DKR diesel engines, one per propeller shaft. The engines produced a total of 8,400 metric horsepower (6,178 kW), enough to give them a speed of 21 knots (39 km/h; 24 mph). When submerged each shaft was driven by a PG11 1,200-metric-horsepower (883 kW) electric motor for 10.3 knots (19.1 km/h; 11.9 mph). The boats had a surface endurance of 7,500 nautical miles (13,900 km; 8,600 mi) at 10.3 knots (19.1 km/h; 11.9 mph) and 176 nmi (326 km; 203 mi) at 3.1 knots (5.7 km/h; 3.6 mph) submerged.

They were armed with six 533-millimeter (21 in) torpedo tubes in the bow and four were in the stern, two internal and two external. They carried a dozen reloads. A dual-purpose minelaying/ballast tank was located under the conning tower that housed 20 chutes for EP-36 mines which also served as outlets for the ballast tank's Kingston valves. This arrangement proved problematic as this was the location of the greatest structural loads in the hull and the mines were sometimes pinched in the chutes as the hull flexed. Another issue was that the chutes would sometimes jam when debris was drawn in with ballast water. The boats were also equipped with a pair of 100-millimeter (3.9 in) B-24PL deck guns fore and aft on the conning tower and a pair of 45-millimeter (2 in) 21-K guns above them.

== Construction and career ==
K-23 was laid down on 5 February 1938 by Zavod No. 190 in Leningrad, launched on 28 April 1938, and completed on 25 September 1940. She was commissioned into the Baltic Fleet on 25 October. The boat had departed Leningrad on 13 June 1941 and was enroute to Molotovsk, now Severodvinsk, in the White Sea–Baltic Canal when the Axis Powers invaded the Soviet Union on 22 June. K-22 arrived at her destination on 12 July and was commissioned into the Northern Fleet on 17 September.

The submarine's first patrol involved laying a minefield off Kirkenes, Norway, on 29 October that damaged a minesweeper and sank a 3,664-gross register ton (GRT) steamship. The next had her lay four small minefields off Kvænangen on 19–20 November. K-23 laid a pair of minefields on 6–7 January 1942 off Porsangerfjorden that sank a small coaster. She was part of a group of six submarines that were tasked to screen the southern flank of Convoy PQ 12 and Convoy QP 8 in March, but her patrol was uneventful. The submarine is assigned similar duties for Convoy QP 11 in April–May. After the convoy had departed the area, the Soviet submarines proceeded to the Norwegian coast where K-23 unsuccessfully attacked a small convoy off Cape Nordkinn on 12 May. She attempted to evade the defending escorts with her superior speed on the surface, but she was forced to dive by an aircraft summoned by the escorts and was sunk by depth charges from the German submarine chasers UJ-1101, UJ-1108 and UJ-1110 The boat was under command of Captain Magomet Gadzhiyev for her entire career; he was posthumously awarded the Hero of the Soviet Union.

== Claims ==
Ships sunk by K-23
Date	Ship	Flag	Tonnage	Notes
19 January 1942	Sørøy	(Norway)	506 GRT	Merchant ship (artillery)
15 February 1942	Brik	(Norway)	3664 GRT	Merchant ship (mine)
Total:			4,170 GRT	

Additionally, the German minesweeper M-22 was damaged on 5 November 1941 by a mine laid earlier from the submarine. K-23 also shelled the Norwegian fishing boat Start on 26 November 1941, wounding seven sailors.

== Bibliography ==
- Budzbon, Przemysław; Radziemski, Jan & Twardowski, Marek (2022). Warships of the Soviet Fleets 1939–1945. Vol. I: Major Combatants. Annapolis, Maryland: Naval Institute Press. ISBN 978-1-68247-877-6.
- Polmar, Norman & Noot, Jurrien (1991). Submarines of the Russian and Soviet Navies, 1718–1990. Annapolis, Maryland: Naval Institute Press. ISBN 0-87021-570-1.
- Rohwer, Jürgen (2005). Chronology of the War at Sea 1939–1945: The Naval History of World War Two (Third Revised ed.). Annapolis, Maryland: Naval Institute Press. ISBN 1-59114-119-2.
