= Soviet submarine K-22 =

History

Soviet Union
- Name: K-22
- Builder: Zavod No. 190, Leningrad
- Laid down: 5 January 1938
- Launched: 4 November 1938
- Completed: 15 July 1940
- Commissioned: 7 August 1940
- Fate: Sunk, 7 February 1943

General characteristics
- Class & type: Soviet K-class submarine
- Displacement: 1,490 t (1,470 long tons) (surfaced); 2,104 t (2,071 long tons) (submerged)
- Length: 97.7 m (320 ft 6 in) (o/a)
- Beam: 7.4 m (24 ft 3 in)
- Draught: 4.5 m (14 ft 9 in) (full load)
- Installed power: 8,400 PS (6,200 kW) (diesel); 2,400 PS (1,800 kW) (electric)
- Propulsion: 2-shaft diesel electric
- Speed: 21 knots (39 km/h; 24 mph) (surfaced); 10.3 knots (19.1 km/h; 11.9 mph) (submerged)
- Range: 7,500 nmi (13,900 km; 8,600 mi) at 10.3 knots (19.1 km/h; 11.9 mph) (surfaced); 176 nmi (326 km; 203 mi) at 3.1 knots (5.7 km/h; 3.6 mph) (submerged)
- Test depth: 80 m (260 ft)
- Complement: 66
- Sensors & processing systems: Tamir-51 sonar
- Armament: 6 × bow 533 mm (21 in) torpedo tubes; 4 × stern 533 mm (21 in) torpedo tubes (2 internal, 2 external); 2 × 100 mm (3.9 in) deck guns; 2 × 45 mm (1.8 in) deck guns; 20 × mines

K-22 was one of a dozen double-hulled K-class submarine cruisers built for the Soviet Navy during the late 1930s. Commissioned in 1940 into the Baltic Fleet and commanded by Viktor Nikolaevich Kotel'nikov (Russian: Виктор Николаевич Котельников), she did not conduct any war patrols in the Baltic Sea immediately after the Axis powers invaded the Soviet Union in June 1941 (Operation Barbarossa). The boat transferred to the Northern Fleet in late 1941. K-22 carried out a total of eight war patrols, including one minelaying mission, before her loss in 1943.

== Design and description ==
Despite the unsuccessful Pravda class built in the early 1930s, the Soviet Navy still dreamed of cruiser submarines capable of attacking enemy ships far from Soviet territory. In 1936 it received approval to build them with the addition of minelaying capability (Project 41). The boats displaced 1,490 metric tons (1,470 long tons) surfaced and 2,104 t (2,071 long tons) submerged. They had an overall length of 97.7 meters (321 ft), a beam of 7.4 meters (24 ft 3 in), and a draft of 4.5 meters (15 ft) at full load. The boats had a maximum operating depth of 80 m (260 ft). Their crew numbered 66 officers and crewmen.

For surface running, the K-class boats were powered by a pair of 9DKR diesel engines, one per propeller shaft. The engines produced a total of 8,400 metric horsepower (6,178 kW), enough to give them a speed of 21 knots (39 km/h; 24 mph). When submerged each shaft was driven by a PG11 1,200-metric-horsepower (883 kW) electric motor for 10.3 knots (19.1 km/h; 11.9 mph). The boats had a surface endurance of 7,500 nautical miles (13,900 km; 8,600 mi) at 10.3 knots (19.1 km/h; 11.9 mph) and 176 nmi (326 km; 203 mi) at 3.1 knots (5.7 km/h; 3.6 mph) submerged.

They were armed with six 533-millimeter (21 in) torpedo tubes in the bow and four were in the stern, two internal and two external. They carried a dozen reloads. A dual-purpose minelaying/ballast tank was located under the conning tower that housed 20 chutes for EP-36 mines which also served as outlets for the ballast tank's Kingston valves. This arrangement proved problematic as this was the location of the greatest structural loads in the hull and the mines were sometimes pinched in the chutes as the hull flexed. Another issue was that the chutes would sometimes jam when debris was drawn in with ballast water. The boats were also equipped with a pair of 100-millimeter (3.9 in) B-24PL deck guns fore and aft on the conning tower and a pair of 45-millimeter (2 in) 21-K guns above them.

== Construction and career ==
K-22 was laid down on 5 January 1938 by Zavod No. 190 in Leningrad, launched on 4 November, and completed on 15 July 1940. She was commissioned on 7 August 1940 into the Baltic Fleet. After the Soviet Union was invaded on 22 June, the boat was transferred from Leningrad to Molotovsk, now Severodvinsk, via the White Sea–Baltic Canal. K-22 departed on 22 August and arrived there on 4 September. She was transferred to the Northern Fleet on 17 September.

Her first war patrol off the Norwegian coast in October–November was uneventful. The submarine laid a minefield near Rolvsøya, Norway, in early December and made an unsuccessful attack using her guns on a small ship on 9 December. Two days later K-22 engaged a small convoy with her guns. During her third patrol, she bombarded the fishing harbor of Berlevåg on 19 January 1942. She further damaged the wrecked freighter Mimona and sank a fishing boat with her guns. K-22 was one of four submarines that screened the southern flank of Convoy PQ 13 in April. She made an unsuccessful attack on a convoy of three minesweepers on 3 April near the Svaerholt Peninsula, Norway. On 9 April she discovered the damaged submarine ShCh-421 that had been disabled by a mine. K-22 rescued ShCh-421's crew and then scuttled it with a torpedo. On 7 February 1943, K-22 was sunk with all hands by a mine off Vardø, Norway.

== Claims ==
Ships sunk by K-22
Date	Ship	Flag	Tonnage	Notes
11 December 1941	Alphar	(Norway)	? GRT	Fishing vessel (artillery)
11 December 1941	Borgar	(Norway)	? GRT	Fishing vessel (artillery)
19 January 1942	Mimona	(Norway)	1147 GRT	grounded Merchant ship (artillery/torpedo)
19 January 1942	Vaaland	(Norway)	106 GRT	Fishing vessel (artillery)
Total:			1,253 GRT	

== Bibliography ==
- Budzbon, Przemysław; Radziemski, Jan & Twardowski, Marek (2022). Warships of the Soviet Fleets 1939–1945. Vol. I: Major Combatants. Naval Institute Press. ISBN 978-1-68247-877-6.
- Polmar, Norman & Noot, Jurrien (1991). Submarines of the Russian and Soviet Navies, 1718–1990. Naval Institute Press. ISBN 0-87021-570-1.
- Rohwer, Jürgen (2005). Chronology of the War at Sea 1939–1945: The Naval History of World War Two (Third Revised ed.). Naval Institute Press. ISBN 1-59114-119-2.
