= Soviet submarine K-56 (1940) =

- design of the class

History

USSR Ensign
- Name: K-56
- Builder: Zavod No. 189
- Laid down: 17 October 1937
- Launched: 29 December 1940
- Completed: 29 October 1942
- Commissioned: 25 November 1942
- Out of service: 16 October 1957
- Fate: Expended 1957

General characteristics
- Class & type: Soviet K-class submarine
- Displacement: 1,490 t (1,470 long tons) (surfaced); 2,104 t (2,071 long tons) (submerged)
- Length: 97.7 m (320 ft 6 in) (o/a)
- Beam: 7.4 m (24 ft 3 in)
- Draught: 4.5 m (14 ft 9 in) (full load)
- Installed power: 8,400 PS (6,200 kW) (diesel); 2,400 PS (1,800 kW) (electric)
- Propulsion: 2-shaft diesel electric
- Speed: 21 knots (39 km/h; 24 mph) (surfaced); 10.3 knots (19.1 km/h; 11.9 mph) (submerged)
- Range: 7,500 nmi (13,900 km; 8,600 mi) at 10.3 knots (19.1 km/h; 11.9 mph) (surfaced); 176 nmi (326 km; 203 mi) at 3.1 knots (5.7 km/h; 3.6 mph) (submerged)
- Test depth: 80 m (260 ft)
- Complement: 66
- Sensors & processing systems: Tamir-51 sonar
- Armament: 6 × bow 533 mm (21 in) torpedo tubes; 4 × stern 533 mm (21 in) torpedo tubes (2 internal, 2 external); 2 × 45 mm (1.8 in) deck guns; 20 × mines

K-56 was one of a dozen double-hulled K-class submarine cruisers built for the Soviet Navy during the late 1930s. The submarine's construction was interrupted by the Axis powers' invasion of the Soviet Union in June 1941 (Operation Barbarossa) and the subsequent Siege of Leningrad, delaying her commissioning into the Baltic Fleet until 1942. She could not do anything other than training until the siege was broken and Estonia liberated in 1944. Her three wartime patrols were not very successful.

After the war, K-56 was transferred to the Northern Fleet in 1948. She became an experimental ship in late 1956 and was sunk during a nuclear test in the Arctic the following year. She was stricken from the navy list in 1957.

== Design and description ==
Despite the unsuccessful Pravda class built in the early 1930s, the Soviet Navy still dreamed of cruiser submarines capable of attacking enemy ships far from Soviet territory. In 1936 it received approval to build them with the addition of minelaying capability (Project 41). The boats displaced 1,490 metric tons (1,470 long tons) surfaced and 2,104 t (2,071 long tons) submerged. They had an overall length of 97.7 meters (321 ft), a beam of 7.4 meters (24 ft 3 in), and a draft of 4.5 meters (15 ft) at full load. The boats had a maximum operating depth of 80 m (260 ft). Their crew numbered 66 officers and crewmen.

For surface running, the K-class boats were powered by a pair of 9DKR diesel engines, one per propeller shaft. The engines produced a total of 8,400 metric horsepower (6,178 kW), enough to give them a speed of 21 knots (39 km/h; 24 mph). When submerged each shaft was driven by a PG11 1,200-metric-horsepower (883 kW) electric motor for 10.3 knots (19.1 km/h; 11.9 mph). The boats had a surface endurance of 7,500 nautical miles (13,900 km; 8,600 mi) at 10.3 knots (19.1 km/h; 11.9 mph) and 176 nmi (326 km; 203 mi) at 3.1 knots (5.7 km/h; 3.6 mph) submerged.

They were armed with six 533-millimeter (21 in) torpedo tubes in the bow and four were in the stern, two internal and two external. They carried a dozen reloads. A dual-purpose minelaying/ballast tank was located under the conning tower that housed 20 chutes for EP-36 mines which also served as outlets for the ballast tank's Kingston valves. This arrangement proved problematic as this was the location of the greatest structural loads in the hull and the mines were sometimes pinched in the chutes as the hull flexed. Another issue was that the chutes would sometimes jam when debris was drawn in with ballast water. The boats were also equipped with a pair of 100-millimeter (3.9 in) B-24PL deck guns fore and aft on the conning tower and a pair of 45-millimeter (2 in) 21-K guns above them.

== Construction and career ==
K-56 was laid down on 17 October 1937 by Zavod No. 189 in Leningrad and launched on 29 December 1940. When the Axis Powers invaded on 22 June 1941, the submarine was 87 percent complete as she was expected to be completed in September. The invasion delayed her completion until 29 October 1942. She was commissioned into the Baltic Fleet on 12 November. Strong Axis defenses prevented her first war patrol until October 1944 after the Baltic offensive liberated Estonia.

K-56 patrolled off the East Prussian coast and missed one ship on 26 October off Brüsterort. She departed for her next patrol in mid-December. The boat missed the training ship Hansa on 23 December, missed another ship two days later, damaged the merchant ship SS Baltenland on 26 December and torpedoed the Swedish steamship Venersborg three days later. K-56's next patrol was not until late March 1945; she missed the submarine chaser UJ 1201 on 4 April north of the Stolpe Bank, but sank the Swedish lugger Ramona with her guns on 11 April.

K-56 was transferred to the Northern Fleet in 1948 and was renamed B-9 the following year. She became an experimental ship on 30 December 1956 and was sunk on 24 September 1957 at Novaya Zemlya during a nuclear test. The boat was stricken on 16 October 1957.

== Claims ==
Ships sunk by K-56
Date	Ship	Flag	Tonnage	Notes
29 December 1944	Venersborg	(Sweden)	1046 GRT	Merchant ship (torpedo)
11 April 1945	Ramona	(Sweden)	57 GRT	Fishing boat (artillery)
Total:			1,103 GRT	

== Bibliography ==
- Budzbon, Przemysław; Radziemski, Jan & Twardowski, Marek (2022). Warships of the Soviet Fleets 1939–1945. Vol. I: Major Combatants. Annapolis, Maryland: Naval Institute Press. ISBN 978-1-68247-877-6.
- Polmar, Norman & Noot, Jurrien (1991). Submarines of the Russian and Soviet Navies, 1718–1990. Annapolis, Maryland: Naval Institute Press. ISBN 0-87021-570-1.
- Rohwer, Jürgen (2005). Chronology of the War at Sea 1939–1945: The Naval History of World War Two (Third Revised ed.). Annapolis, Maryland: Naval Institute Press. ISBN 1-59114-119-2.
