= Magomet Gadzhiyev =

Soviet submarine commander (1907–1942)

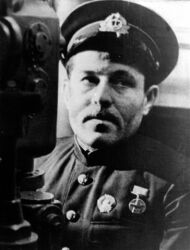
- Born: 20 December 1907; Megeb, Dagestan, Russian Empire (now in the Republic of Dagestan, Russian Federation)
- Died: 12 May 1942 (aged 34) Barents Sea
- Allegiance: Soviet Union
- Branch: Soviet Navy
- Service years: 1925–1942
- Rank: Captain 2nd Rank
- Commands: Soviet Navy
- Conflicts: World War II †
- Awards: Hero of the Soviet Union

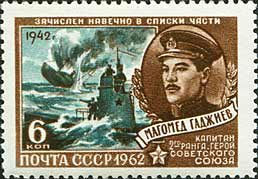
1962 postage stamp honoring Magomet Gadzhiyev.

Magomet Imadutinovich Gadzhiyev (Russian: Магомет Имадутдинович Гаджиев; 20 December 1907 – 12 May 1942) was a Soviet Navy submarine commander and Hero of the Soviet Union. He fought and died during World War II.

== Biography ==
Gadzhiev was an ethnic Avar, born into a peasant family in the Megeb area of Dagestan. In 1925 he completed two courses at the First Dagestan State Technical School in the city of Temir-Khan-Shura, now the city of Buynaksk. He joined the navy in 1925 and graduated from the Frunze Higher Naval School in 1932. He was appointed to the submarine division of the Black Sea Fleet and was second in command of the AG class submarine A2. He subsequently commanded the submarines M-9 and ShCh-117.

In 1939 he studied at the Voroshilov Naval Academy and was assigned to the Northern Fleet on graduation. He became commander of the submarine brigade of the Northern Fleet in 1940. His command sank 10 German transports in 1942. On 12 May 1942 his boat, the K class K 23, was sunk by German forces commanded by Wolfgang Kaden with all hands lost.

== Awards and honours ==
- Gadzhiev was posthumously awarded the Hero of the Soviet Union on 23 October 1942
- Order of Lenin (twice)
- Order of the Red Banner

The town of Gadzhiyevo near Murmansk was named after him. A Don class submarine depot ship was named Magomet Gadzhiyev in the 1960s. Streets in Murmansk, Makhachkala, Severomorsk, Oskemen and Polyarny, and several schools, were named in his honour.
