= Soviet submarine K-55 =

Soviet submarine K-55 may refer to one of the following submarines of the Soviet Navy:

- Soviet submarine K-55 (1941), a K-class submarine; decommissioned in 1954 and scrapped
- Soviet submarine K-55 (1960), a Hotel-class (or Project 658) nuclear submarine; decommissioned in 1989 and scrapped
