= HMS Seawolf (47S) =

Submarine of the Royal Navy

Coordinates: 57°39′N 9°28′E

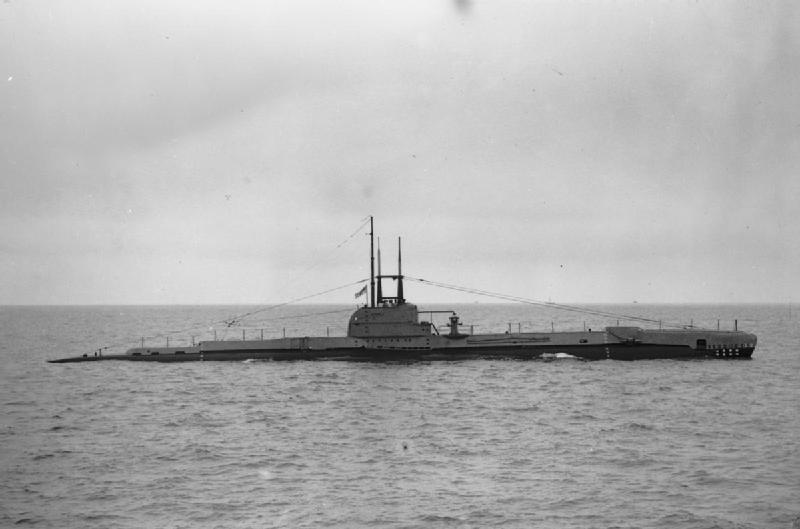
- Seawolf on the surface

History

United Kingdom
- Name: Seawolf
- Ordered: 15 March 1934
- Builder: Scotts, Greenock
- Laid down: 25 May 1934
- Launched: 28 November 1935
- Commissioned: 12 March 1936
- Identification: Pennant number 47S
- Fate: Sold for scrap, November 1945
- Badge

General characteristics
- Class & type: S-class submarine
- Displacement: 768 long tons (780 t) surfaced; 960 long tons (980 t) submerged
- Length: 208 ft 8 in (63.6 m)
- Beam: 24 ft (7.3 m)
- Draught: 11 ft 10 in (3.6 m)
- Installed power: 1,550 bhp (1,160 kW) (diesel); 1,300 hp (970 kW) (electric)
- Propulsion: 2 × diesel engines; 2 × electric motors
- Speed: 13.75 knots (25.47 km/h; 15.82 mph) surfaced; 10 knots (19 km/h; 12 mph) submerged
- Range: 6,000 nmi (11,000 km; 6,900 mi) at 10 knots (19 km/h; 12 mph) surface; 64 nmi (119 km; 74 mi) at 2 knots (3.7 km/h; 2.3 mph) submerged
- Test depth: 300 feet (91.4 m)
- Complement: 40
- Armament: 6 × bow 21 in (533 mm) torpedo tubes; 1 × 3-inch (76 mm) deck gun

HMS Seawolf was a second-batch S-class submarine built during the 1930s for the Royal Navy. Completed in 1936, the boat fought in the Second World War.

== Design and description ==
The second batch of S-class submarines were designed as slightly improved and enlarged versions of the earlier boats of the class and were intended to operate in the North and Baltic Seas. The submarines had a length of 208 feet 8 inches (63.6 m) overall, a beam of 24 feet (7.3 m) and a mean draught of 11 feet 10 inches (3.6 m). They displaced 768 long tons (780 t) on the surface and 960 long tons (980 t) submerged. The S-class submarines had a crew of 40 officers and ratings. They had a diving depth of 300 feet (91.4 m).

For surface running, the boats were powered by two 775-brake-horsepower (578 kW) diesel engines, each driving one propeller shaft. When submerged each propeller was driven by a 650-horsepower (485 kW) electric motor. They could reach 13.75 knots (25.47 km/h; 15.82 mph) on the surface and 10 knots (19 km/h; 12 mph) underwater. On the surface, the second-batch boats had a range of 6,000 nautical miles (11,000 km; 6,900 mi) at 10 knots (19 km/h; 12 mph) and 64 nmi (119 km; 74 mi) at 2 knots (3.7 km/h; 2.3 mph) submerged.

The S-class boats were armed with six 21-inch (533 mm) torpedo tubes in the bow. They carried six reload torpedoes for a total of a dozen torpedoes. They were also armed with a 3-inch (76 mm) deck gun.

== Construction and career ==
Ordered on 15 March 1934, Seawolf was laid down on 25 May 1934 in Scotts Shipbuilding & Engineering's shipyard in Greenock and was launched on 28 November 1935. The boat was completed on 12 March 1936.

== Wartime career ==
Seawolf was a member of the 2nd Submarine Flotilla at the onset of war. From 23–26 August 1939, the 2nd Submarine Flotilla deployed to its wartime bases at Dundee and Blyth. On 6 October 1939, she attacked the German light cruiser Nürnberg and the torpedo boat Falke in the Skagerrak, but none of the targets were hit. In April 1940, Seawolf sank the German merchant Hamm, and in November, claimed to have sunk the German merchant Bessheim. Bessheim was mined and sunk the previous day off Hammerfest, so Seawolf had probably attacked another merchant.

She was one of a number of submarines ordered to track Bismarck before her eventual sinking. On 6 March 1942, Seawolf sighted Tirpitz, along with her escorting destroyers Z5 Paul Jacobi, Z14 Friedrich Ihn, Z7 Hermann Schoemann and Z25. The German ships had sailed from Trondheim, Norway with the intention of attacking convoy PQ 12.

Seawolf arrived in Halifax, Nova Scotia in 1943 to help the Royal Canadian Navy in anti-submarine warfare training. She was commanded from August 1943 until 23 August 1944 by Commander Denis Woolnough Mills, for whom Seawolf was his first command after being promoted from First Lieutenant of HMS Thunderbolt.

Seawolf was sold for breaking up in November 1945 to Marine Industries, of Montreal.
