= KIV =

KIV could refer to:

- Chișinău International Airport, Moldova; former IATA airport code KIV.
- Kiveton Bridge railway station, England; National Rail station code KIV.
