= Soviet K-class submarine =

Large Soviet WWII-era submarine class

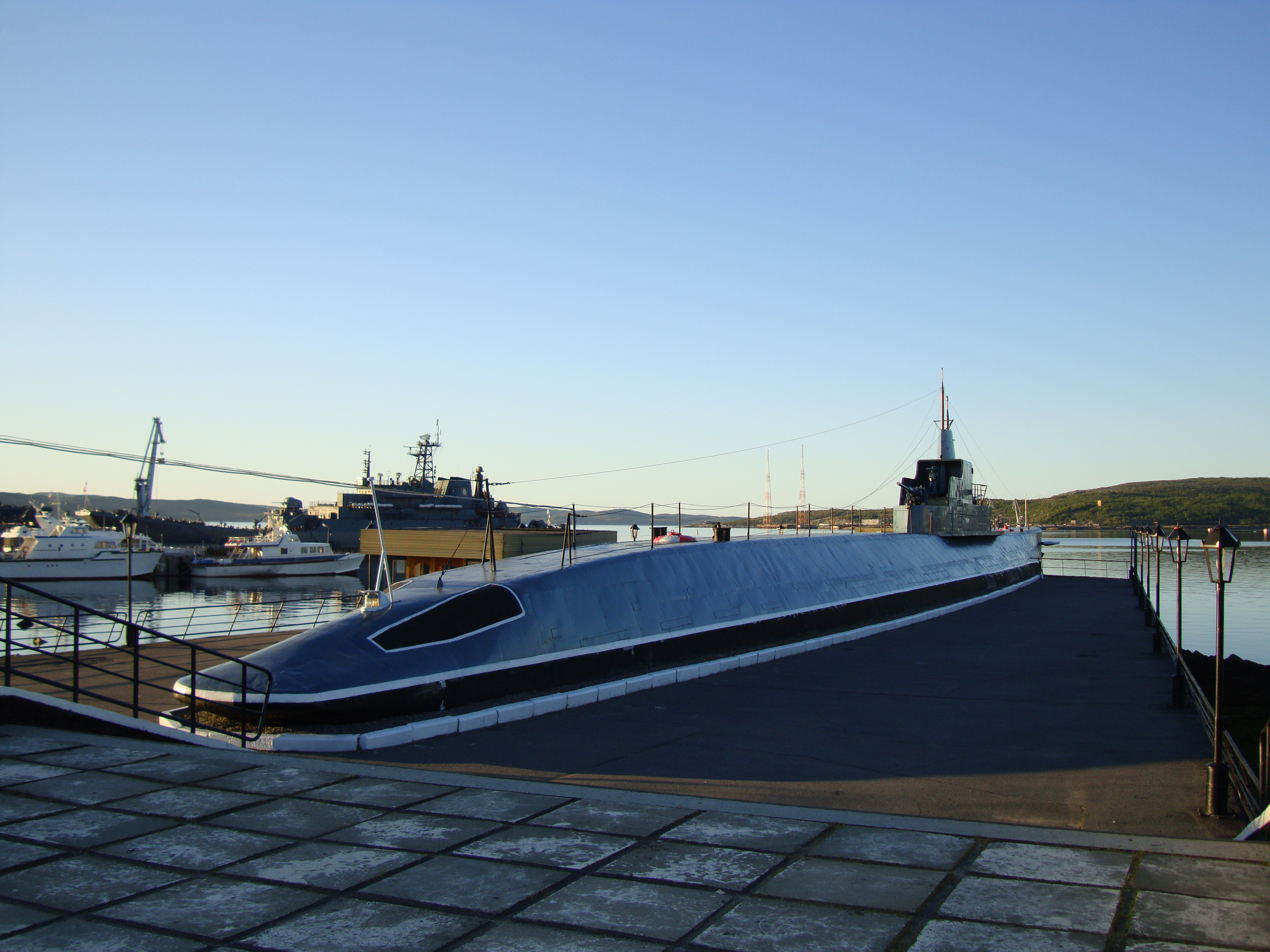
- K-21

Class overview
- Name: K class
- Operators: Soviet Navy
- Preceded by: Soviet S class
- Succeeded by: Zulu class
- In service: 1939–1959
- In commission: 1940–1959
- Planned: 12
- Completed: 11
- Canceled: 1
- Lost: 5
- Retired: 7
- Preserved: 1

General characteristics
- Type: Submarine
- Displacement: 1,490 tons surfaced; 2,600 tons submerged
- Length: 97.65 m (320 ft 4 in)
- Beam: 7.4 m (24 ft 3 in)
- Draught: 4.51 m (14 ft 10 in)
- Propulsion: 2-shaft diesel electric, 8,400 hp (6,300 kW) diesel, 2,400 hp (1,800 kW) electric
- Speed: surface – up to 22.5 knots (41.7 km/h; 25.9 mph); submerged – 10 knots (19 km/h; 12 mph)
- Range: 14,000 nautical miles (26,000 km; 16,000 mi) at 11 knots (20 km/h; 13 mph)
- Test depth: 230 ft (70 m)
- Complement: 67 (10 officers)
- Armament: 6 × bow torpedo tubes; 2 × stern torpedo tubes; 2 × external stern torpedo tubes (24 torpedoes); 2 × 100 mm (4 in) guns; 2 × 45 mm (1.8 in) guns; 20 × mines

The K class or Kreiserskaya class (Russian: Крейсерская, lit. 'cruiser') were a class of cruiser submarines and were the largest submarines built for the Soviet Navy during World War II. They were designed for oceanic operations in the Pacific and Arctic. Eleven boats of the class were made, one was cancelled and scrapped. The K class submarines served in the Northern Fleet and the Baltic Fleet, and saw the most combat along the coast of Norway. They were also nicknamed the Katyusha class.

== Design ==
The design was approved in 1936 as a long range "cruiser submarine" with a heavy torpedo and gun armament. The boats could operate as a fleet submarine working with the battle fleet or as long range commerce raiders. In January 1936, the project was originally designated as the KE-9 XIV Series (Russian: КЭ-9 XIV серии), short for "cruiser squadron" submarine (Russian: крейсерско-эскадренная).

They were a significantly improved version of the Pravda class and overcame most of their shortcomings. The double hull was divided into seven compartments. It was originally planned to carry a small floatplane for scouting but this concept was abandoned when the planned aircraft proved too flimsy.

Yakubov and Worth state that these were the most successful Soviet submarines of the World War II era, with high speed and good seakeeping. This class of submarine possessed better ventilation and air conditioning systems than any other class of Soviet submarine in World War II. They had amenities such as a bunk for every sailor, small cabins for each officer, showers, electric heaters (this class was designed to operate primarily in the Arctic), and an electric galley. The hull provided spacious accommodation. Diving time was 60 seconds. American naval constructors inspected K-21 in 1944, and thought the design to be workmanlike but technically inferior to contemporary American boats such as the Gato-class submarines.

An improved design, the KU class, which was to be of welded construction was in planning in 1941. 24 KU boats were planned, but none were started.

== Boats ==
All twelve boats were built by Marti Yard / Ordzhonikidze Yard, Leningrad, on the Baltic Sea, for the Soviet Northern Fleet. K-1 to K-23 were transferred before the German Invasion, and K-51 to K-56 were trapped in Leningrad during the blockade; they were completed after the war and transferred to the Arctic

- K-1

Laid down 27 December 1936
Launched 4 May 1938
Commissioned 26 May 1940
Missing in the Kara Sea after 5 September 1943

- K-2

Laid down 27 December 1936
Launched 4 May 1938
Commissioned 26 May 1940
Missing after 26 August 1942; likely sunk in September 1942 by mines near Tanafjord, Norway

- K-3

Laid down 27 December 1936
Launched 1938
Commissioned 19 December 1940
Sunk 21 March 1943 by German anti-submarine vessels near Båtsfjord, Norway

- K-21

Laid down 10 December 1937
Launched 16 August 1939
Commissioned 3 February 1941
Made an unsuccessful attack on the German battleship Tirpitz, during the PQ 17 convoy when she was commanded by Nikolai Lunin, stationary training ship 1959, saved as memorial

- K-22

Laid down 5 January 1938
Launched 3 November 1938,
Commissioned 7 August 1940
Sunk 7 February 1943 by mines

- K-23

Laid down 5 February 1938
Launched 28 April 1939
Commissioned 25 October 1940
Sunk 12 May 1942 by German anti-submarine vessels commanded by Wolfgang Kaden near Olesa Fjord, Norway, the boat was commanded by Magomet Gadzhiyev

- K-51

Laid down 26 February 1938
Launched 30 July 1939
Commissioned 17 September 1941
Stricken 13 March 1975

- K-52

Laid down 26 February 1938
Launched 5 December 1939
Commissioned 11 October 1942
Stricken 20 March 1978

- K-53

Laid down 30 May 1938
Launched 2 Sep 1939
Commissioned 31 Aug 1943
Stricken 11 March 1960

- K-54

Laid down 30 Apr 1937
Launched 8 Mar 1941
Never commissioned, scrapped in 1949

- K-55

Laid down 29 Apr 1937
Launched 7 Feb 1941
Commissioned 25 Dec 1944
Decommissioned 11 September 1954, stricken in 1964

- K-56

Laid down 17 Oct 1937
Launched 29 Dec 1940
Commissioned 25 Nov 1942
Decommissioned 30 December 1956, sunk 16 October 1957 during nuclear tests and stricken
