= Pravda-class submarine =

Class of Soviet submarines

Class overview
- Name: Pravda or P class
- Operators: Soviet Navy
- In service: 1935–1956
- In commission: 1956
- Planned: 4
- Completed: 3
- Canceled: 1
- Lost: 1
- Retired: 2

General characteristics
- Type: Submarine
- Displacement: 1,200 tons surfaced; 1,870 tons submerged
- Length: 90.0 m (295.3 ft)
- Propulsion: 2-shaft diesel electric, 5,400 hp (4,027 kW) diesel, 1,400 hp (1,044 kW) electric
- Speed: surface - 20.5 knots (38.0 km/h; 23.6 mph); submerged - 11.8 knots (21.9 km/h; 13.6 mph)
- Range: 5,700 nmi (10,600 km) at 10 kn (19 km/h)
- Test depth: 340 ft (100 m)
- Complement: 54
- Armament: 4 × bow torpedo tubes; 2 × stern torpedo tubes; (10 torpedoes); 2 × 100 mm (3.9 in) guns; 1 × 45 mm (1.8 in) guns,

The Pravda class or P-class submarines were built for the Soviet Navy in the mid-1930s. They originally served as training ships, then later served in World War II for transport duties. They were intended to operate with the surface fleet but failed to meet specifications, particularly for surface speed. The initial design envisaged 130 mm (5.1 in) guns for surface action. These boats had a long building time, being laid down in 1931 and completed in 1936.

They were double hull boats with eight compartments. Their main shortcomings were underpowered machinery, a long diving time and poor seakeeping. Weakness in hull strength had to be remedied by stiffening and weight cutting. Yakubov and Worth state that these were the least successful Soviet submarines of this era and were relegated to secondary duties upon completion. The two surviving boats had their conning towers re-built to resemble the later K class.

== Ships ==
Three boats were built by Ordzhonikidze Yard Leningrad. All served with the Baltic Fleet.

- P1 Pravda (Truth) - Launched 3 January 1934 - sunk off Hango, Finland, 17 September 1941
- P2 Zvezda (Star) - Launched 1935 - Broken up 1956
- P3 Iskra (Spark) - Launched 1934 - Broken up 1952

A fourth boat was planned but not laid down.

== Bibliography ==
- Breemer, Jan S. (1989). Soviet Submarines: Design, Development and Tactics. Coulsdon, Surrey: Jane's Information Group. ISBN 0710605269.
- Budzbon, Przemysław (1980). "Soviet Union". In Chesneau, Roger (ed.). Conway's All the World's Fighting Ships 1922–1946. Conway Maritime Press. pp. 318–346. ISBN 0-85177-146-7.
- Budzbon, Przemysław & Radziemski, Jan (2020). "The Beginnings of Soviet Naval Power". In Jordan, John (ed.). Warship 2020. Osprey. pp. 82–101. ISBN 978-1-4728-4071-4.
- Budzbon, Przemysław; Radziemski, Jan & Twardowski, Marek (2022). Warships of the Soviet Fleets 1939–1945. Vol. I: Major Combatants. Naval Institute Press. ISBN 978-1-68247-877-6.
- Meister, Jürg (1977). Soviet Warships of the Second World War. London: Macdonald & Jane's.
- Polmar, Norman & Noot, Jurrien (1991). Submarines of the Russian and Soviet Navies, 1718–1990. Naval Institute Press. ISBN 0-87021-570-1.
- Rohwer, Jürgen & Monakov, Mikhail S. (2001). Stalin's Ocean-Going Fleet: Soviet Naval Strategy and Shipbuilding Programs 1935–1953. Frank Cass. ISBN 0-7146-4895-7.
- Westwood, J. N. (1994). Russian Naval Construction, 1905–45. Macmillan. ISBN 0-333-55553-8.
