= Convoy PQ 13 =

British Arctic convoy in March 1942

- Part of the Arctic Convoys of the Second World War
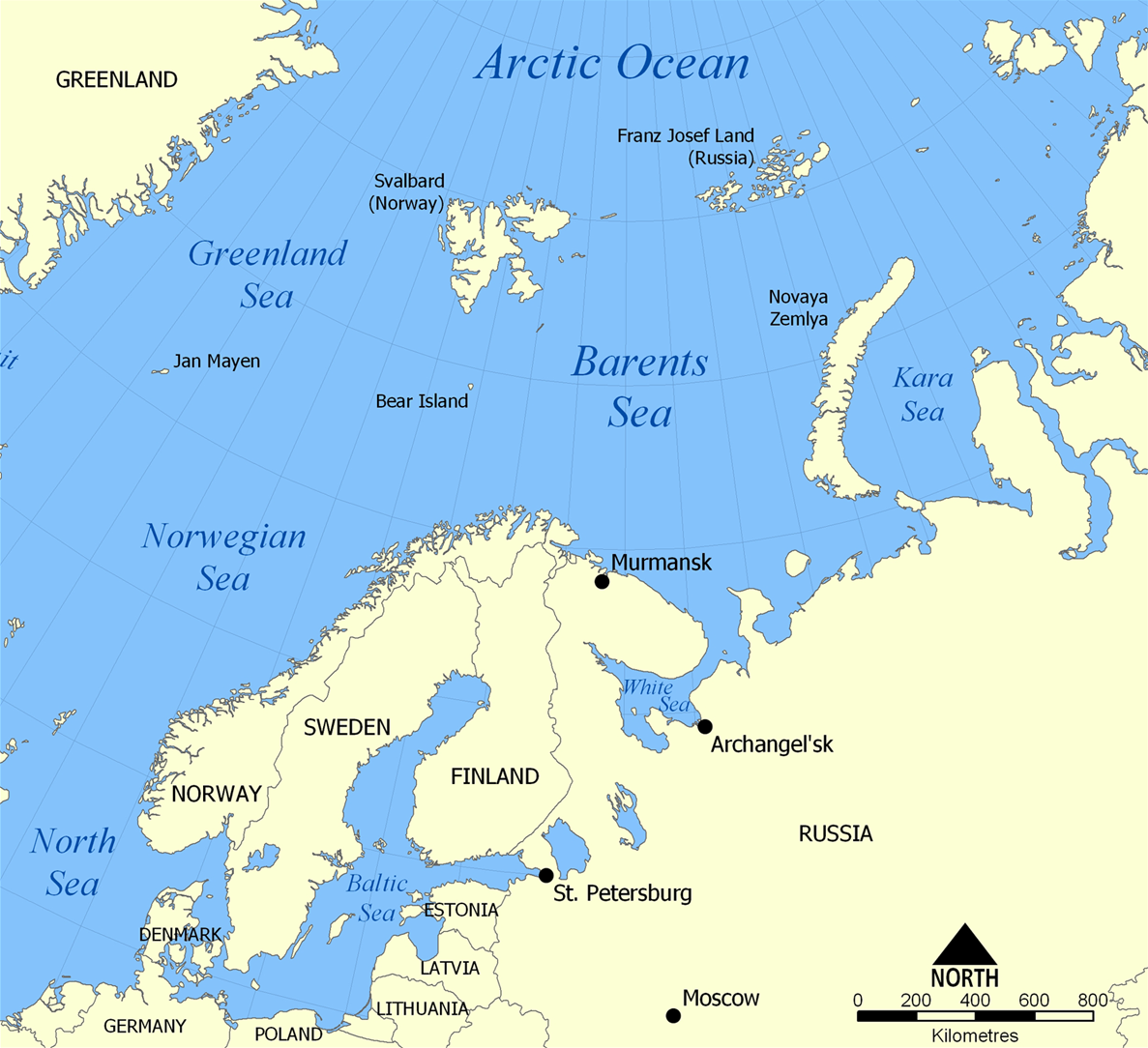
- The Norwegian Sea and the Barents Sea, site of the Arctic convoys
Date	20 March – 2 April 1942
Location	Norwegian Sea–Barents Sea

Belligerents
Kriegsmarine; Luftwaffe	United Kingdom; Poland; Soviet Union

Commanders and leaders
Hubert Schmundt; Gottfried Pönitz	John Tovey; Leslie Saunders

Strength
6 U-boats; 3 destroyers	1 cruiser; 5 destroyers; 2 anti-submarine warfare trawlers; 3 whalers; 1 Fleet oiler and destroyer escort

Casualties and losses
1 destroyer sunk; several aircraft shot down; 1 U-boat sunk	1 cruiser severely damaged; 1 RN whaler sunk; 5 freighters sunk

Convoy PQ 13 (20 March – 2 April 1942) was a British Arctic convoy that delivered war supplies from the Western Allies to the USSR during the Second World War. The first days of the voyage were quiet but on 25 March a storm blew up and lasted for three days. On 28 April, when the storm had abated, the convoy had been scattered for 150 nmi (280 km; 170 mi) westwards from the North Cape (Norwegian: Nordkapp). The convoy escorts, led by the cruiser HMS Trinidad, manged to concentrate the merchant ships into two groups 100 nmi (190 km; 120 mi) apart, with several stragglers unaccounted for.

The clear weather revealed the ships to Luftwaffe reconnaissance aircraft and the ships were attacked during the day, two ships being sunk and others damaged. Using Ultra decrypts the Admiralty warned the convoy commander about some of the air attacks and U-boat search zones. Three German destroyers sailed from Kirkenes to intercept the ships and combed the track of the convoy, sinking one ship and taking the crew prisoner. Ultra decrypts gave much detail on the destroyer sortie and during the night of 28/29 March, Trinidad and the destroyer Fury lay in wait.

At 8:45 a.m. on 29 March Trinidad detected the German destroyers on radar and hit Z26 with its second salvo. Skirmishing between blizzards of snow, Trinidad was hit by one of its torpedoes and severely damaged. Z 26 was sunk by the destroyer Eclipse and Trinidad managed to reach Murmansk. As the merchant ships came close to Murmansk, two were torpedoed and sunk by U-boats. Ships arrived at Murmansk in groups or individually until 2 April.

Five ships were sunk of the 19 starters and this alarmed Admiral John Tovey, the commander of the Home Fleet and the First Sea Lord, Admiral Dudley Pound, that the German operation against the convoy foreshadowed more combined-arms attacks against Arctic convoys. As the hours of daylight increased, the weather improved and the number of German U-boats and Luftwaffe aircraft increased, they predicted that convoy losses could only increase. The Germans thought that five ships was a poor exchange for the loss of a destroyer, a U-boat and several aircraft.

== Background ==
=== Arctic Ocean ===
Between Greenland and Norway are some of the most stormy waters of the world's oceans, 890 mi (1,440 km) of water under gales full of snow, sleet and hail. Around the North Cape and the Barents Sea the sea temperature rarely rises about 4 °C (39 °F) and a man in the water would probably die of exposure unless rescued immediately. The cold water and air made spray freeze on the superstructure of ships, which had to be removed quickly to avoid the ship becoming top-heavy. The cold Arctic water is met by the Gulf Stream, warm water from the Gulf of Mexico, which becomes the North Atlantic Drift. Arriving at the south-west of England, the drift moves between Scotland and Iceland.

North of Norway the drift splits, one stream goes north of Bear Island to Svalbard and the southern stream follows the coast of Murmansk into the Barents Sea. The mingling of cold Arctic water and warmer water of higher salinity generates thick banks of fog for convoys to hide in but the waters drastically reduce the effectiveness of Asdic as U-boats moved in waters of differing temperatures and density. In winter, polar ice could form as far south as 50 mi (80 km) off the North Cape, forcing ships closer to Luftwaffe air bases or being able to sail further out to sea in summer, when the ice can recede northwards as far as Svalbard. The region is in perpetual darkness in winter and permanent daylight in the summer which made air reconnaissance almost impossible or easy.

=== Arctic convoys ===
Hvalfjörður in Iceland

In October 1941, after Operation Barbarossa, the German invasion of the USSR, which had begun on 22 June, the Prime Minister, Winston Churchill, made a commitment to send a convoy to the Arctic ports of the USSR every ten days and to deliver 1,200 tanks a month from July 1942 to January 1943, followed by 2,000 tanks and another 3,600 aircraft more than already promised. (Note: In October 1941, the unloading capacity of Archangel was 300,000 long tons (300,000 t), Vladivostok 140,000 long tons (140,000 t) and 60,000 long tons (61,000 t) in the Persian Gulf ports.) The first convoy was due at Murmansk around 12 October and the next convoy was to depart Iceland on 22 October. A motley of British, Allied and neutral shipping loaded with military stores and raw materials for the Soviet war effort would be assembled at Hvalfjörður in Iceland, convenient for ships from both sides of the Atlantic.

By late 1941, the convoy system used in the Atlantic had been established on the Arctic run; a convoy commodore ensured that the ships' masters and signals officers attended a briefing before sailing to make arrangements for the management of the convoy, which sailed in a formation of long rows of short columns. The commodore was usually a retired naval officer, aboard a ship identified by a white pendant with a blue cross. The commodore was assisted by a Naval signals party of four men, who used lamps, semaphore flags and telescopes to pass signals, coded from books carried in a bag, weighted to be dumped overboard. In large convoys, the commodore was assisted by vice- and rear-commodores who liaised with the escort commander and directed the speed, course and zig-zagging of the merchant ships. (Note: By the end of 1941, 187 Matilda II and 249 Valentine tanks had been delivered, comprising 25 per cent of the medium-heavy tanks in the Red Army, making 30–40 per cent of the medium-heavy tanks defending Moscow. In December 1941, 16 per cent of the fighters defending Moscow were Hawker Hurricanes and Tomahawk fighters from Britain and by 1 January 1942, 96 Hurricane fighters were flying in the Soviet Air Forces (Voyenno-Vozdushnye Sily, VVS). The British supplied radar apparatus, machine tools, Asdic and commodities.)

=== Signals intelligence ===
==== Bletchley Park ====
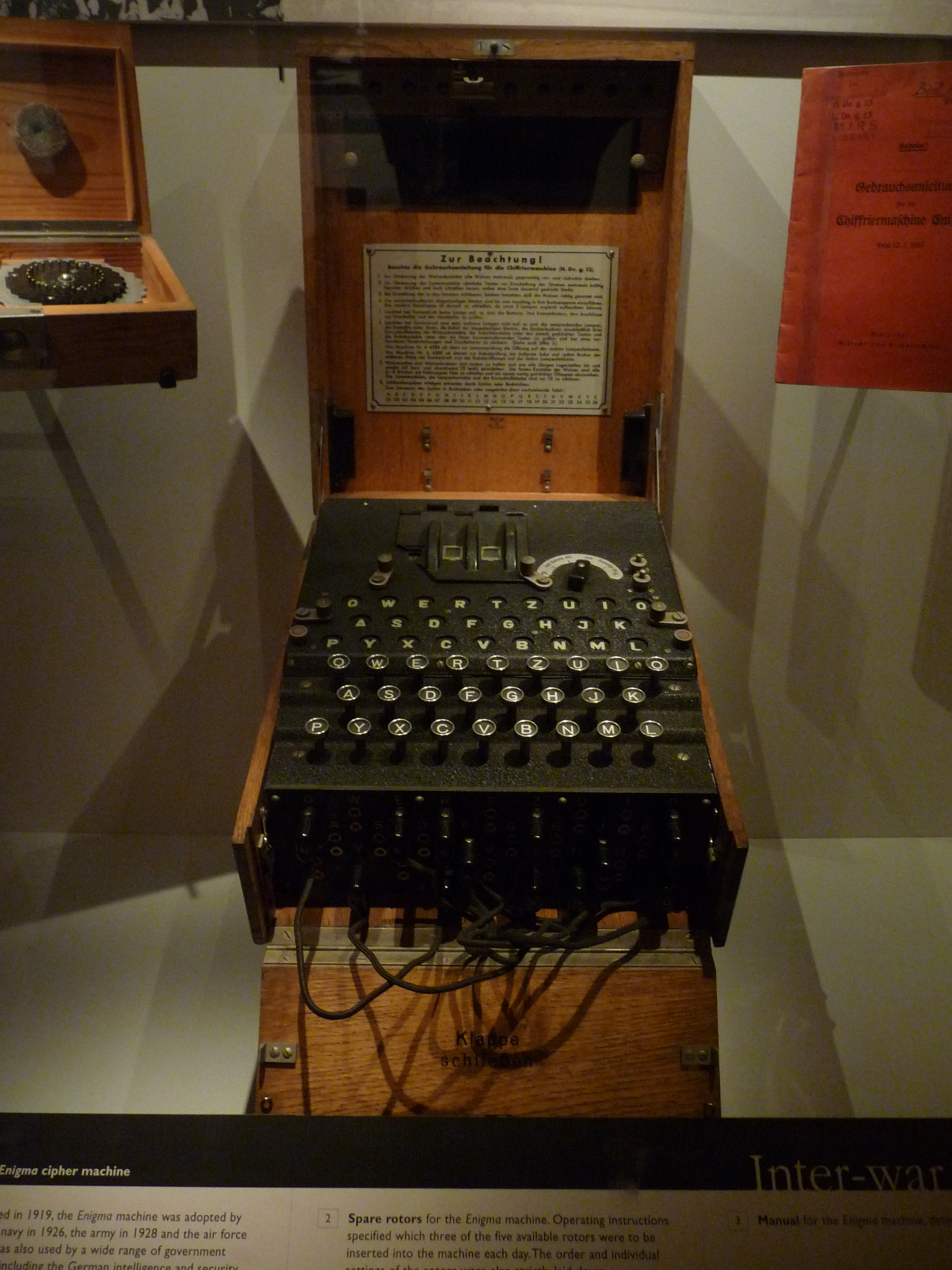
Photograph of a German Enigma coding machine

The British Government Code and Cypher School (GC&CS) based at Bletchley Park housed a small industry of code-breakers and traffic analysts. By June 1941, the German Enigma machine Home Waters (Heimish) settings used by surface ships and U-boats could quickly be read. On 1 February 1942, the Enigma machines used in U-boats in the Atlantic and Mediterranean were changed but German ships and the U-boats in Arctic waters continued with the older Heimish (Hydra from 1942, Dolphin to the British). By mid-1941, British Y-stations were able to receive and read Luftwaffe W/T transmissions and give advance warning of Luftwaffe operations. In 1941, naval Headache personnel, with receivers to eavesdrop on Luftwaffe wireless transmissions, had been embarked on warships.

==== B-Dienst ====
The rival German Beobachtungsdienst (B-Dienst, Observation Service) of the Kriegsmarine Marinenachrichtendienst (MND, Naval Intelligence Service) had broken several Admiralty codes and cyphers by 1939, which were used to help Kriegsmarine ships elude British forces and provide opportunities for surprise attacks. From June to August 1940, six British submarines were sunk in the Skaggerak using information gleaned from British wireless signals. In 1941, B-Dienst read signals from the Commander in Chief Western Approaches informing convoys of areas patrolled by U-boats, enabling the submarines to move into "safe" zones. B-Dienst broke Naval Cypher No 3 in February 1942 and by March was reading up to 80 per cent of the traffic but not fast enough for the results to have tactical effect and relied on traffic analysis.

== Prelude ==
=== Luftflotte 5 tactics ===
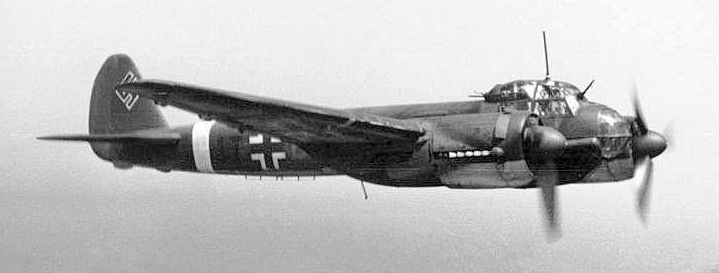
Photograph of a Junkers Ju 88 in flight

As soon as information was received about the assembly of a convoy, Fliegerführer Nord (West) would send long-range reconnaissance aircraft to search Iceland and northern Scotland. Once a convoy was spotted, aircraft were to keep contact as far as possible in the extreme weather of the area. If contact was lost its course at the last sighting would be extrapolated and overlapping sorties would be flown to regain contact. All three Fliegerführer were to co-operate as the convoy moved through their operational areas. Fliegerführer Lofoten would begin the anti-convoy operation east to a line from the North Cape to Spitzbergen Island, whence Fliegerführer Nord (Ost) would take over using his and the aircraft of Fliegerführer Lofoten, that would fly to Kirkenes or Petsamo to stay in range. Fliegerführer Nord (Ost) was not allowed to divert aircraft to ground support during the operation. As soon as the convoy came into range, the aircraft were to keep up a continuous attack until the convoy docked at Murmansk or Arkhangelsk.

=== German air-sea rescue ===
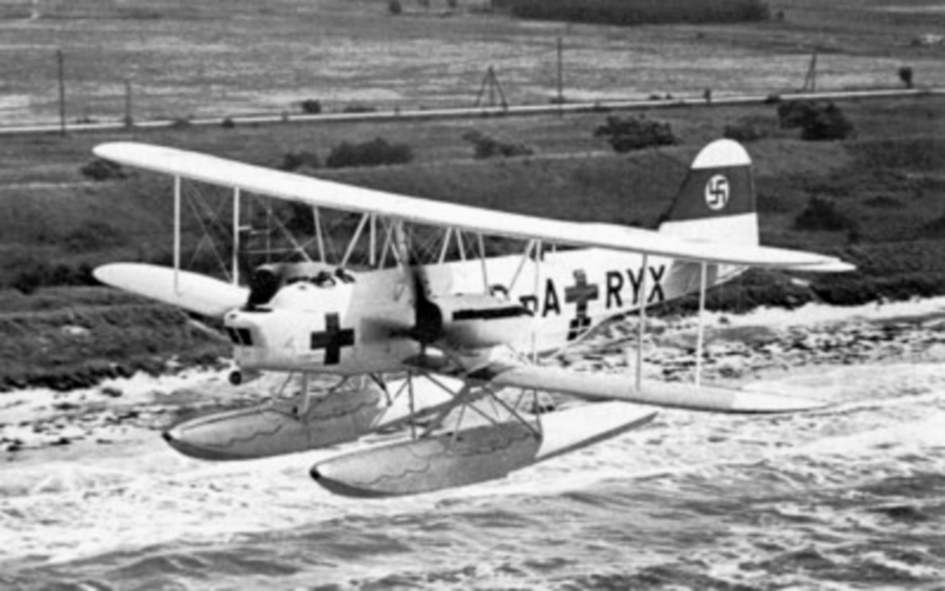
Example of a Heinkel He 59 search and rescue aircraft (1940)

The Luftwaffe Sea Rescue Service (Seenotdienst) along with the Kriegsmarine, the Norwegian Society for Sea Rescue (RS) and ships on passage, recovered aircrew and shipwrecked sailors. The service comprised Seenotbereich VIII at Stavanger covering Stavanger, Bergen and Trondheim and Seenotbereich IX at Kirkenes for Tromsø, Billefjord and Kirkenes. Co-operation was as important in rescues as it was in anti-shipping operations if people were to be saved before they succumbed to the climate and severe weather. The sea rescue aircraft comprised Heinkel He 59 floatplanes, Dornier Do 18 and Dornier Do 24 seaplanes. Oberkommando der Luftwaffe (OKL, high command of the Luftwaffe) was not able to increase the number of search and rescue aircraft in Norway, due to a general shortage of aircraft and crews, despite Stumpff pointing out that coming down in such cold waters required extremely swift recovery and that his crews "must be given a chance of rescue" or morale could not be maintained.

=== U-boats ===
From January to the end of March 1942, 18 new Type VII U-boats were sent to Norway from Germany, increasing the number to 25. The boats were under the command of Admiral Hubert Schmundt, the Admiral Nordmeer. The U-boats at Kirkenes and Narvik had to sail south to Trondheim for serious repairs. During the perpetual darkness of the winter of 1941 to 1942 the U-boats found nothing in February, three PQ convoys of fifty ships reached Murmansk and the reciprocal QP convoys evaded attack. On 6 March, the German battleship Tirpitz sailed against Convoy PQ 12 and the return Convoy QP 8. Four of the Kirkenes U-boats took up ambush positions off the Kola Inlet and two boats from Narvik sailed with Tirpitz. The new U-boat U-377 was attacked by Luftwaffe aircraft but escaped damage. Convoy PQ 12 was spotted by U-454 that homed U-456 into the area but the convoy arrived intact. Admiral Karl Dönitz the Befehlshaber der U-Boote (BdU, Commander, U-boats) berated the Seekriegsleitung (SKL) for sending the boats too close to Murmansk, denying them room to manoeuvre.

=== Convoy ===
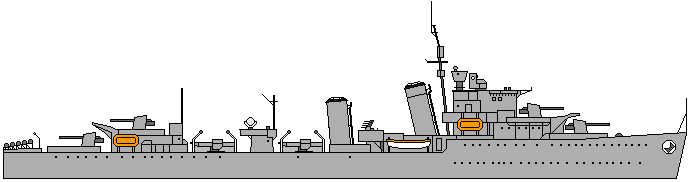
Diagram of a British E-class destroyer

Convoy PQ 13 comprised seven British ships, including the tanker SS Scottish American, four US freighters, one Polish, four of Panamanian and one ship of Honduran registry. The Convoy Commodore was Dennis Casey in River Afton. On 10 March, the convoy was escorted for the first stage of its voyage, Loch Ewe in Scotland to Iceland, by the Western Local Escort, comprising two destroyers and an anti-submarine warfare (ASW) trawler. From Iceland to the Soviet Union, departing on 20 March, the convoy had an ocean escort of a Crown Colony-class cruiser, two destroyers and two trawlers, augmented by three whalers being transferred to the Soviet Navy. The Ocean Escort was commanded by Captain Leslie Saunders in the cruiser HMS Trinidad.

=== Home Fleet ===
In support of the convoy escort, guarding against a sortie by Tirpitz and the other big ships based in Norway, was a Heavy Cover Force from the Home Fleet, comprising the battleships Duke of York (Vice Admiral Alban Curteis commanding) King George V, battlecruiser Renown, aircraft carrier HMS Victorious, the cruisers Kent and Edinburgh and sixteen destroyers, Ashanti, Bedouin, Echo, Escapade, Eskimo, Faulknor, Foresight, Icarus, Inglefield, Ledbury, Marne, Middleton, Onslow, Punjabi, Tartar and Wheatland. The Heavy Cover Force was to follow the track of the convoy at long distance, until the convoy was past Bear Island and then cover Convoy QP 9 the reciprocal convoy. The Home Fleet had a unique Special W/T procedure SWT) that used unusual wireless frequencies, used no call-signs and transmitted messages in a way that made it difficult to know that they were naval transmissions. During the convoy, attempts to use the SWT failed.

== Voyage ==
=== 20−23 March ===
The first stage escort, three ships bound from Reykjavík to Murmansk and the close escort for the voyage joined Convoy PQ 13 and sailed from Reykjavík on 20 March. The convoy was helped by a powerful south-westerly wind and soon after noon on 23 March, when around 120 nmi (220 km; 140 mi) to the south-east of Jan Mayen the convoy turned to the east after the Admiralty had received a decrypted Enigma signal giving the position of U-boat search line and during the unscheduled turn, the fleet oiler Oligarch and its escort, Lamerton made rendezvous with the Home Fleet to fuel its destroyer escorts.

=== 24 March ===
At noon, when at 69°20′N, 00°20′E, the convoy turned back to the north-east for Bear Island but the diversion had brought the convoy nearer to the Luftwaffe base at Bardufoss, was 40 nmi (74 km; 46 mi) further on than planned and was making nearly 9 kn (17 km/h; 10 mph); the Home Fleet covering force was on a parallel course about 250 nmi (460 km; 290 mi) further back. Trinidad sailed away from the convoy to the south-east for the night and during the long night of the Arctic winter, the wind rose to a gale and began to blow from the north-east. The merchant ships had serious trouble in station-keeping as the gale blew head-on, filling the air with spray, reducing visibility, making the ships wallow and take on more water. The cold froze the water that did not drain through the scuppers and stuck to the superstructure, masts, aerials and guns.

=== 25–26 March ===
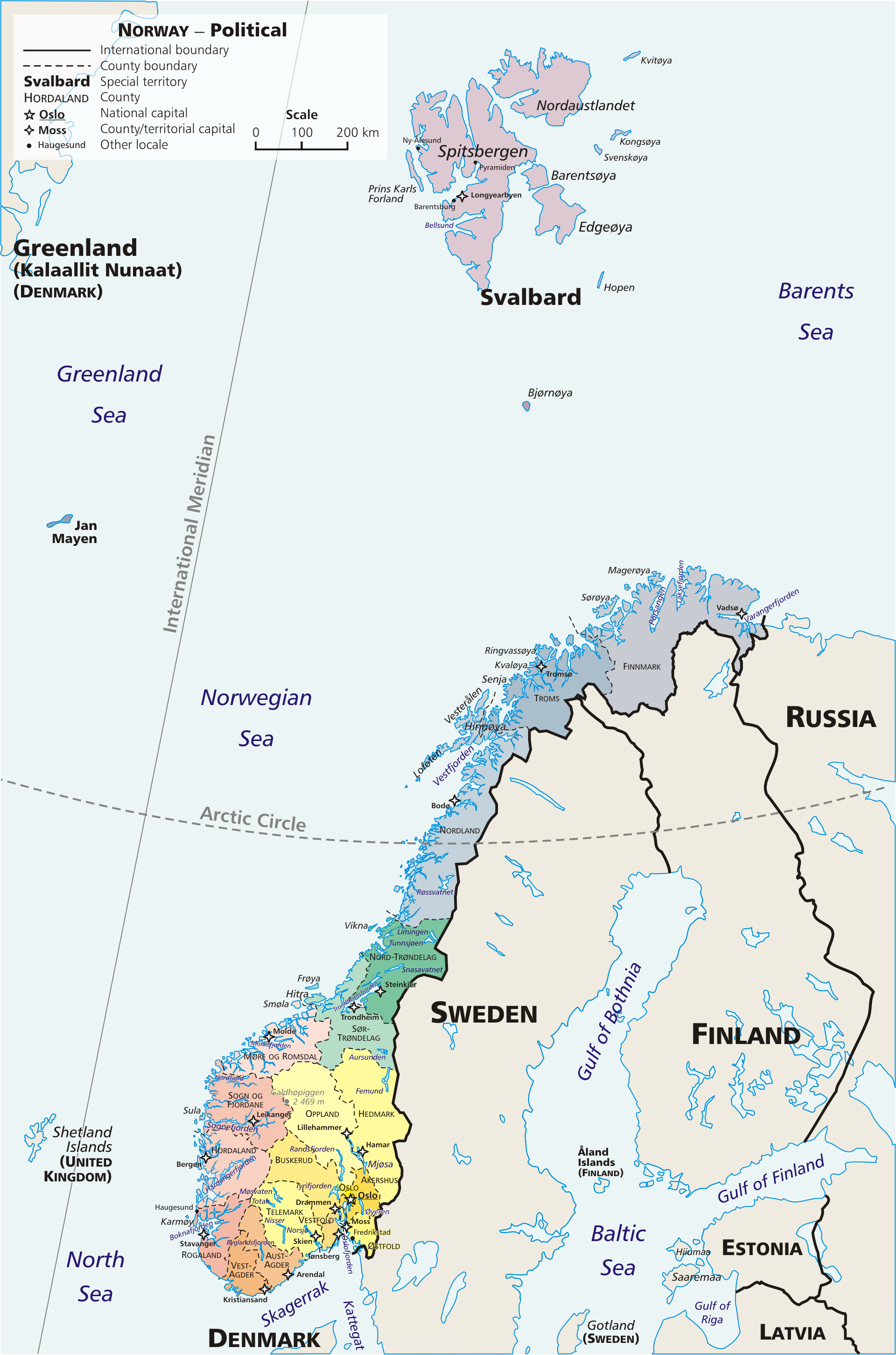
Map of Norway showing the Lofoten Islands, just inside the Arctic Circle

The convoy was disrupted by the storm; keeping a look-out became difficult, affecting station-keeping, ships had to be steered taking in the view from one wave peak to the next and while not requiring exceptional seamanship the convoy began to lose formation. The convoy escorts had their own problems, the smaller ships bucking and rolling. The misery of the destroyer crews, many of them inexperienced wartime conscripts and pre-war yachtsmen, was exceptionally bad. men on duty had no hot food to go with the cold, wet and the gyrations of the superstructure.

During the evening, Saunders broke wireless silence to the Admiralty and to Rear-Admiral Richard Bevan the Senior British Naval Officer, North Russia, then broadcast a convoy rally point to the south of Bear Island for 27 March. In the afternoon of 26 March, Ballot, Empire Starlight, Induna and Silja, claimed a German aircraft shot down. The group was later joined by Dunboyne, Effingham and Mana, the eastern-most segment of the convoy. A long way to the south-west, the aircraft carrier Victorious and the destroyer Tartar had been damaged in the storm and the Home Fleet ships had turned for home.

=== 27 March ===
By dawn on 27 March, the storm had been blowing for 36 hours and none of the ships were near the rally point. An Admiralty signal warning of a surface attack arrived and that the senior officer of the escort was to gather the merchant ships. Before noon, Fury received a signal from Sumba that it was 50 nmi (93 km; 58 mi) north-east of Bear Island, making little headway and was running out of fuel. The captain turned west-south-west to follow the signal bearing, found Sumba at 4:00 p.m. and refuelled Sumba with a pipe over the stern. The ships were sitting ducks for the hours it took to refuel the whaler. (Note: Lieutenant-Commander Colin Campbell, the commander of Fury, reported that the short range of the whalers and the breaking of wireless silence made these vessels a menace.)

To the south, River Afton could make no headway or steer less than 60° off the wind direction, bringing the ship ever closer to Lofoten Islands, until the gale diminished around noon, then it began a solo run to Murmansk. During the worst of the storm, HMS Nigeria covering the reciprocal Convoy QP 9 west of Bear Island, was about 100 nmi (190 km; 120 mi) south-west of the island, when it met Trinidad, that had possibly seen Empire Ranger the evening before. Trinidad had found Harpalion and another ship and the destroyer Eclipse found one ship and another five that had kept together, south of the escorts and north of River Afton.

=== 28 March ===
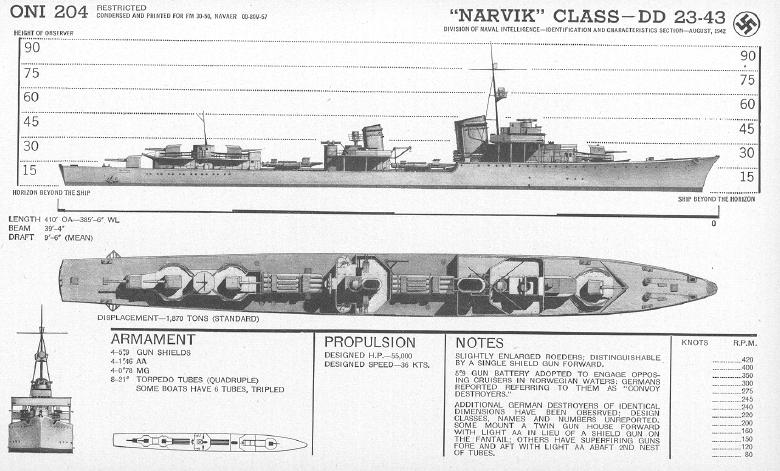
Diagram of a Type 1936A-class destroyer

By 8:30 a.m. the storm had ended, leaving clear skies and sunshine. Overnight, Trinidad had accelerated and headed eastwards and came upon Empire Ranger 8 nmi (15 km; 9.2 mi) north of the North Cape (Nordkapp). Trinidad turned about to unite with th two destroyers, due to the possibility of meeting a German naval sortie. About 40 nmi (74 km; 46 mi) there was an advanced group of ships comprising Ballot, Dunboyne, Effingham, Empire Starlight, Induna and Mana, with the whaler Silja and the ASW trawler Blackfly; 35 nmi (65 km; 40 mi) further west were Fury and Harpalion. Eclipse the trawler Paynter, Sumba and five freighters with the tanker Scottish American were 60 nmi (110 km; 69 mi) behind. At 10:05 a.m. Trinidad fired on a BV 138 reconnaissance aircraft that replied with "Your shots are falling short".

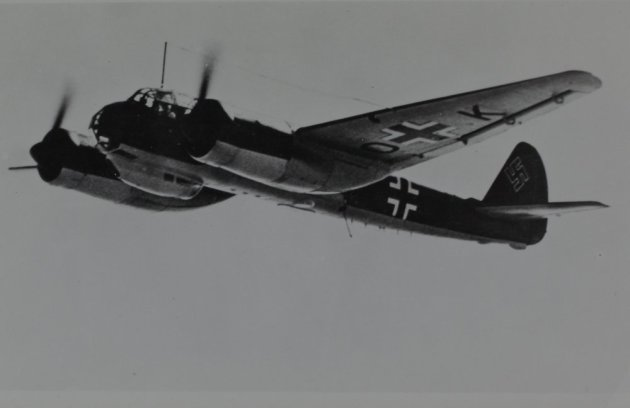
Example of a Junkers Ju 88

Trinidad reached Fury and Harpalion and turned east at 11:25 a.m. All the ships of Convoy PQ 13 were well within range of the Luftwaffe airfield at Banak, some ships no further than 150 nmi (280 km; 170 mi) away. Schmundt ordered the German destroyers Z24, Z25 and Z26 to sail from Kirkenes. The destroyers were carried four 150 mm naval guns each, torpedoes and had a nominal speed of over 35 kn (65 km/h; 40 mph), a formidable challenge to Trinidad that carried twelve BL 6-inch Mk XXIII naval guns and was slower. Paynter was attacked by aircraft at 11:27 a.m. and Junkers Ju 88s (Ju 88s) dive-bombed the eastern group of ships, near-missing Mana and Ballot that was shaken so badly that the captain ordered the crew to make ready to abandon ship as it lost steam and fell back. The captain ordered 16 men to transfer to Silja by lifeboat.

Just after midday, Raceland was bombed and sunk; Trinidad had made occasional radar sweeps to find ships and at 1:15 p.m. detected an aircraft that dived out of cloud and near-missed Trinidad with three bombs. After an hour, more Ju 88s made a more determined attack and near-misses damaged the main wireless transmitters. The captain dodged into mist banks and the gunners put up a tremendous barrage. As the bombers turned away, Harpalion reported an air attack but got away with minor damage. At 7:30 p.m. just before dark, Empire Ranger was caught by bombers at 32°10′E, 72°13′N near the Kola Inlet. The ship sent a distress signal and Blackfly was sent to search for survivors but found nothing when it arrived the next day. Early in the night, Trinidad and Fury moved to the south of Point Tango (72°25′N, 30°00′E) a way-point on the convoy route and rendezvous with the Eastern Local Escort, due to arrive from Murmansk at 8:00 a.m. on 29 March. The point was mid-way between the two big groups of ships, intended to protect them, relying on radar for warning.

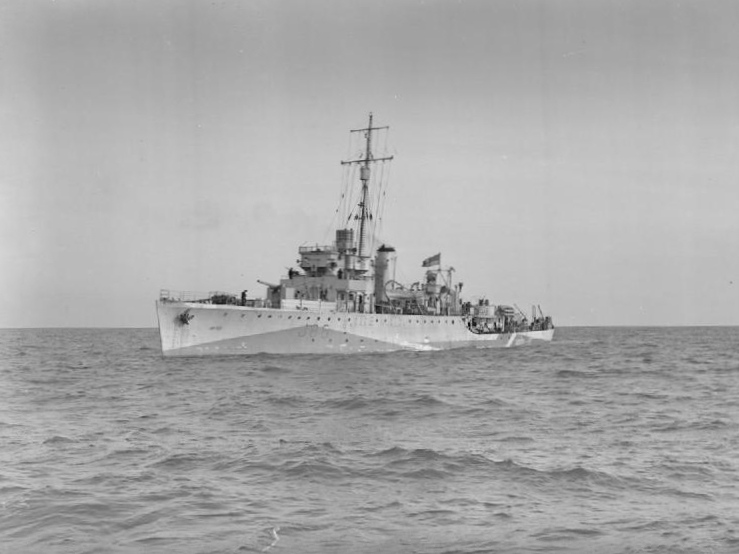
Photograph of Salamander, a Halcyon-class minesweeper in 1943

Four Halcyon-class minesweepers of the 6th Minesweeper Flotilla, Gossamer, Harrier, Hussar and Speedwell sailed from Murmansk to cover the convoy as it turned south to head for the Kola Inlet and Murmansk. Harrier was to look for lifeboats from Empire Ranger and the ships were to search for River Afton and Empire Cowper. These ships carried naval men as supernumerary crew, that were not welcome to the Soviet authorities and Harrier was to take them off. Hussar and Gossamer sighted a U-boat but it dived and escaped. The minesweepers joined the western part of the convoy, except for Harrier that found out about Trinidad and headed for it.

The German destroyer flotilla sailed northwards until reaching a position east of the point where Empire Ranger had been sunk. Pönitz had the destroyers turn west to sail in line abreast at 3 nmi (5.6 km; 3.5 mi) intervals at 15 kn (28 km/h; 17 mph) in the dark. At 10:45 p.m. the destroyers came upon the survivors of Empire Ranger in their lifeboats, rescued them and resumed the sweep. At 12:30 a.m. the flotilla came across Bateau, sank it with gunfire and torpedoes and took the survivors prisoner. The rescued mariners talked freely about the state of the convoy but perhaps deliberately, mentioned two cruisers rather than one and four destroyers. The German ships turned south-east at 25 kn (46 km/h; 29 mph), Pönitz, under the impression that they were too far to the north. Having found nothing, they turned north at 5:30 a.m. and kept this course for three hours. At 2:00 a.m. Trinidad and Fury were sailing to the north-east to close on the eastern group of ships and Position Tango.

=== 29 March ===
The eastern group of Convoy PQ 13, with Silja, Effingham, Empire Starlight, Induna and Mana, had sailed into ice during the night and Ballot had fallen astern. Silja ran short of fuel and Induna began to tow it and took on the 16 men from Ballot who crossed via an ice-floe, bringing the compliment of Induna to 66 men. The group had been shadowed by Luftwaffe reconnaissance aircraft and then bombed by Ju 88s. There was a blizzard of snow, the pack ice grew denser and Induna was almost caught fast in the ice. Empire Starlight, (10,00 GRT) forced a passage for the other ships as they manoeuvred out of the ice. In almost nil visibility due to the blizzard, all bar Induna and Silja escaped after about four hours of moving to-and-fro, heading south-east. By the morning they had been joined by Blackfly that had been looking for Empire Ranger.

==== Surface action ====
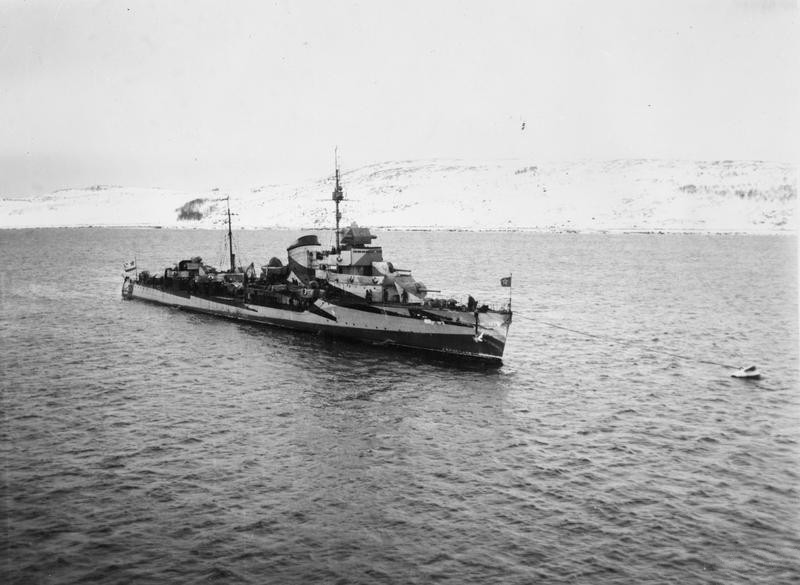
Aerial view of Razumny a sister ship to the Soviet Sokrushitelny

Just after dawn, at 4:00 a.m., on 29 March, observers on Trinidad spotted something about 4 nmi (7.4 km; 4.6 mi) distant, hard to identify in the haze and three salvos were fired at it in case it was a U-boat, then fire was checked in case it was a lifeboat from Empire Ranger. The object submerged and the British ships turned west as the Eastern Local Escort of HMS Oribi and the Soviet destroyers Gremyashchy and Sokrushitelny arrived. Trinidad and the destroyers carried on to the west, looking for Eclipse and its part of the convoy, quickly finding debris from Empire Ranger and four empty lifeboats. Eclipse came into view at 6:30 a.m. with Paynter and Sumba escorting Eldena, El Estero, Empire Cowper, Gallant Fox, Mormacmar, New Westminster City, Scottish American and Tobruk. The Soviet destroyers joined the escorts and Oribi searched 20 nmi (37 km; 23 mi) looking for stragglers.

Trinidad and Fury turned south-east to look for the eastern group. By 8:30 a.m. the German flotilla was ahead of the convoy route. The eastern group had already passed as the German destroyers increased speed to 17 kn (31 km/h; 20 mph) to search to the west. Trinidad and Fury were heading eastwards at 20 kn (37 km/h; 23 mph) between the Germans and the western group and its escorts. As the two groups of ships converged the fine weather of the morning turned overcast with a strengthening wind, mist spreading south from the edge of the Polar ice, reducing visibility. Radar echoes detected by Trinidad were known not to be Allied escorts because of the rendezvous that morning that was four hours ahead of schedule. The echoes were at 6.5 nmi (12.0 km; 7.5 mi) and then at 8:45 a.m. were at 4.5 nmi (8.3 km; 5.2 mi), the crew going to action stations. At 8:49 a.m. at 71°21′N, 33°32′E, three shadowy outlines of destroyers were seen coming out of the mist and Trinidad opened fire at 8:51 a.m. hitting the ship amidships.

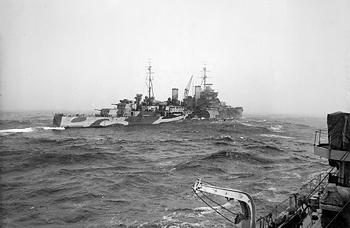
Photograph of HMS Trinidad taken from the destroyer HMS Fury

The first ship, the German destroyer Z 26, replied and hit Trinidad below Y turret. Trinidad shifted fire to one of the other two destroyers and both of them turned to the north-west. Suspicious of a torpedo salvo, Trinidad turned hard to starboard and combed the tracks of two torpedoes as they overtook Trinidad along the port side. Trinidad kept turning until heading north, regaining radar contact of Z 26 at 4 nmi (7.4 km; 4.6 mi). During the tight turn, Trinidad had taken on much water through a shell hole but straightening helped begin to get the damage under control. Trinidad headed north-west, after Z 26 on the same bearing, Fury turning behind Trinidad and Z 24 and Z 25 heading away from Z 26 under the impression that they were under torpedo attack. Turning to the north-east, they departed to the north and disappeared in snow squalls falling from fractus cloud. The engagement had lasted nine minutes.

Trinidad increased speed to 30 kn (56 km/h; 35 mph), after 17 minutes the shape of Z 26 appeared shrouded in smoke and Trinidad made a small turn to starboard to bring all guns to bear. Trinidad opened fire again from 1.5 nmi (2.8 km; 1.7 mi) and readied the port torpedo tubes. Z 26 zig-zagged but did not reply with its guns or torpedoes and had slowed considerably. With Trinidad on the starboard beam, the port torpedoes were fired at 9:22 a.m. but only one launched, the other two having frozen and the first torpedo came to the surface about 600 ft (180 m) from the ship and at 9:24 a.m. and hit Trinidad to port, below the bridge. Seeing the explosion, Pönitz turned Z 26 to flee to the south-west but Fury from behind Trinidad, chased after it. Z 26 and Fury were heading towards the western part of the convoy with its four destroyers. Mist, snow, the sea state created confusion that radar could not resolve because of no means to identify friend or foe but the gunfire of Trinidad could be heard and Lieutenant-Commander Edward Mack on Eclipse had accelerated and zig-zagged around the merchant ships.

All of a sudden, to the north-north-east, a ship appeared from the mist but it looked like Trinidad and Eclipse held its fire. Sokrushitelny opened fire but soon stopped and at 9:30 a.m. Fury burst out of the mist at full speed and fired two salvos before the error was realised. "For some minutes chaos reigned in the destroyer screen" (Edward Mack). Lieutenant-Commander Colin Campbell, the captain of Fury, turned about to guard Trinidad and Eclipse raced after the ship glimpsed in the murk, Mack thinking that it was Trinidad. He talked to Commander John McBeath, the captain of Oribi, using Talk Between Ships, telling him that he was leaving to join Trinidad and to look for a damaged German destroyer on the way. (Note: Talk Between Ships was a short-range VHF wireless system, used for tactical communication once the position of a convoy was known to the Germans.) Eclipse departed at 15 kn (28 km/h; 17 mph) and detected Z 26 on radar at 2 nmi (3.7 km; 2.3 mi) to port and saw the ship at 9:50 .m. when .5 nmi (0.93 km; 0.58 mi). Z 26 also found it difficult to identify the ship closing in, the crew thinking that it was Z 24 or Z 25. When the two ships had made correct identifications, Z 26 made smoke and tried to zig-zag against the fire from Eclipse, returning inaccurate fire intermittently and trying to get the undamaged forward guns to bear. A-gun, on the Eclipse was frozen and it could only use its astern armament by catching up and turning. Both ships tried to get their guns to bear, Eclipse keeping Z 26 ahead, to avoid its forward guns.

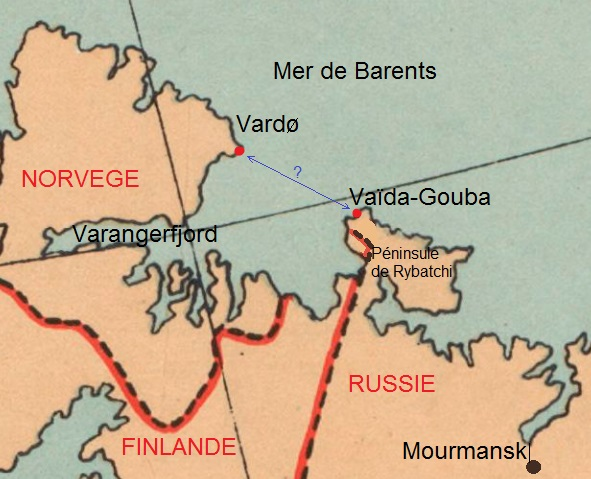
French map of the Kola Inlet and Murmansk

Eclipse followed an oil slick left by Z 26 through the snow squalls and the torpedo officer fired three torpedoes, under the impression that communication with the bridge had been cut. Over thirty minutes, Eclipse hit Z 26 six times with its 4.7-inch guns as Z 26 hit Eclipse twice aft, exploding ready-use ammunition and wounding several crewmen. Z 26 settled lower, listed to port and slowed to a stop. Z24 and Z 25 had sailed northwards then turned south-west towards the sounds of battle, passing to the west of Trinidad and Fury as they looked for Z 26. Eclipse was preparing to fire its last torpedo when Z24 and Z 25 suddenly appeared to starboard, 2 nmi (3.7 km; 2.3 mi) away. The destroyers opened fire on Eclipse just as the snow squalls cleared. Mack ordering full speed and fled to the north-east, chasing after the squalls, Eclipse firing its after armament and receiving four hits, two under the bow and two aft, that took off the aerials; Eclipse disappeared into the snow at 10:35 a.m.

Z24 and Z 25 stayed with Z 26 that was sinking by the stern and at 10:50 a.m. it capsized and sank. Z24 and Z 25 rescued the survivors and then ran for Kirkenes, reaching port at dusk. Mack had turned Eclipse to the east, one man having been killed and twelve men wounded, nine seriously in the ammunition explosion. The crew was tired, fuel was running out and the damage had left the ship unstable. Eclipse suddenly emerged from the blizzard and saw a surfaced U-boat 1,200 yd (1,100 m) off to port. The U-boat fired first Eclipse turned sharply, combed the tracks of two torpedoes and attacked the U-boat, depth charging the area after it dived. Unable to receive signals because of the battle damage, Eclipse missed an order from Trinidad to join its screen and made for the Kola Inlet, arriving the next day with only 40 long tons (41 t) of fuel left.

==== Trinidad ====
By 9:45 a.m. Trinidad was under way to the south-east at 6 kn (11 km/h; 6.9 mph) as much as its bulkheads could stand, escorted by Fury. Most of the fires had been put out and the remainder contained but the power had failed except for the sick bay that was now full of wounded and injured men. Food and drink was distributed to the crew and the return of Fury to protect against U-boats cheered the crew. The western group of the convoy caught up with Trinidad and Oribi joined the U-boat screen. A U-boat was spotted in an opening of the mist and both destroyers attacked and apparently sank U-585. (Note: Post-war analysis found that U-585 was sunk in the German Bantos minefield.) Harrier arrived later to augment the anti-U-boat screen, the list on Trinidad was much reduced and speed increased to 12 kn (22 km/h; 14 mph). Just as the wind abated and visibility increased, salt in the boiler water reduced speed to a crawl. A full moon and the Aurora Borealis made Trinidad a sitting target, with Fury and Oribi circling and searching with their Asdic, seeing off a U-boat. About 70 nmi (130 km; 81 mi) from Murmansk, Bevan was signalled with a request for tugs and air support. After two hours, the engine trouble was remedied and Trinidad reached 7 kn (13 km/h; 8.1 mph), just as another storm began with a northerly wind that Trinidad had to cope with by reversing to get the stern into the wind when blown off course. At 9:30 a.m. on 30 April Trinidad entered the Kola Inlet and Oribi turned back to join the convoy.

=== 30 March – 2 April ===
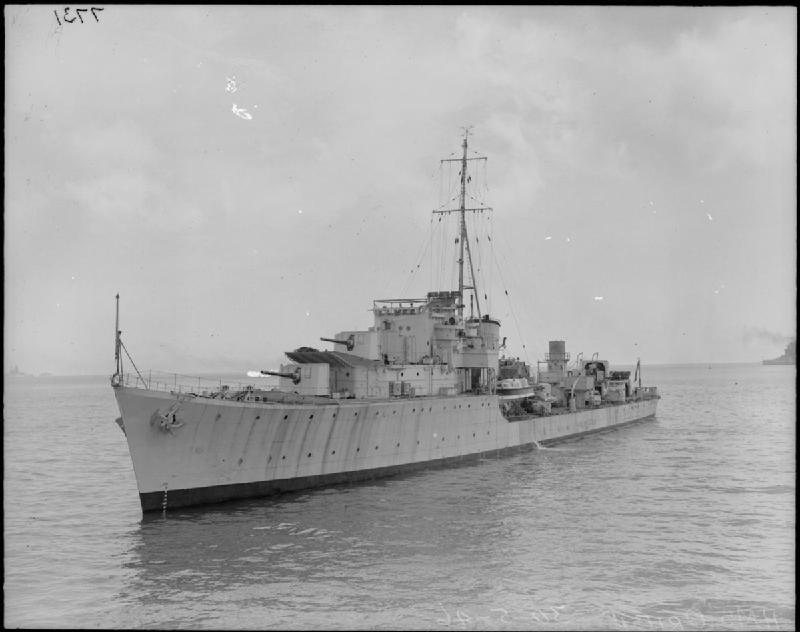
Photograph of HMS Oribi (1946)

Oribi joined the western group that was attacked by German bombers at the mouth of the Kola Inlet and Tobruk claimed two shot down. The eastern group had manoeuvred out of the ice, late in the day and at 9:30 a.m. On 29 April, Effingham was sunk by U-435 that was lying in wait with three other U-boats north of Kildin Island. The rest of the ships reached Kola Inlet unharmed later on, followed by River Afton that had escaped from a U-boat during its solo voyage. The crew of Induna got another tow onto Silja and got south of the ice at about 3:00 p.m. but the blowing up of another storm broke the tow.

After searching through snow squalls, Induna gave up and turned south. At 7:30 a.m. Induna was torpedoed by U-435 that set off a hold full of petrol and trapped men at the rear of the ship. Two lifeboats were got away and most of the survivors were taken on board as the U-boat surfaced and fired another torpedo, finishing off the ship. The lifeboats sailed south, losing many men to frostbite. Around nightfall on 2 April one boat reached the Kola Inlet and the survivors were picked up by a Russian minesweeper, that found the second lifeboat as it returned. (Note: Of 66 men on board, 24 survived, 18 of whom had to have limbs amputated.) During it search for stragglers, Oribi found Silja late on 30 March, that was towed in by Harrier.

== Aftermath ==
=== Analysis ===
In 1994, Richard Woodman wrote that Trinidad had survived and that during Convoy PQ 13 and the reciprocal Convoy QP 9, several Luftwaffe aircraft had been shot down, two U-boats and a Type 1936A (Narvik-class) destroyer had been sunk. SKL became more cautious in risking its ships; Tovey predicted that the Germans were going to make more effort to stop the convoys but would still be loath to risk the big ships, relying on U-boats and aircraft. More reinforcements were sent to Luftflotte 5 from April. Tovey asked the Russians for the use of more submarines in the Barents Sea and for more destroyers to join the Eastern Local Escort. Tovey and Pound wanted the convoys to be stopped during the season of the midnight sun but Churchill refused, because it was vital to keep the Soviet Union in the war.

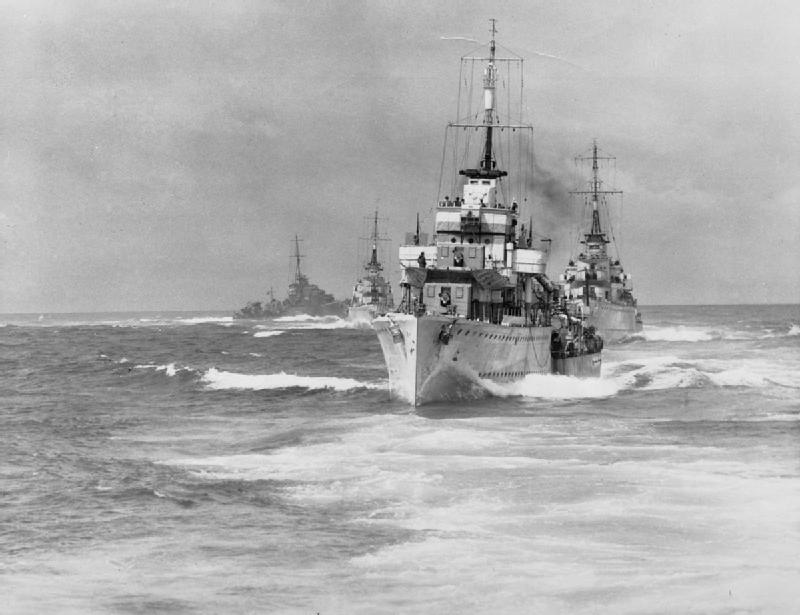
View of HMS Fury in 1944

The convoy could not be called a success, with the loss of more than 30,000 GRT of ships, more than 25 per cent of the convoy. Woodman called the Admiralty assessment that the losses were stragglers was pathetic, writing that this implied that the merchant ships were to blame. Two of the five losses were in the eastern group that re-formed after the storm and went without a close escort for the rest of the voyage. The escorts had shown admirable fighting spirit but not an equivalent tactical finesse. The temptation to look for trouble away from the convoy, led to the beginning of doubts among some of the merchant crews of the certainty that the escorts would always put their survival first.

The distant cover by the Home Fleet had made no difference; sending its destroyer escorts to help reassemble the convoy might have helped the convoy. Trinidad had been damaged by a freak accident but was out of action and stranded. The exposure of defects in British torpedoes and the effect of the freezing temperatures in the Arctic were of little comfort. An enquiry that exonerated the captain and crew, acknowledged that the low temperature lubricants did not work. Experience gained from the Arctic convoys showed that there could never be too many destroyers with the convoy and that while the crew of Trinidad had cheered when Fury arrived, some of the merchant seamen wondered later, why it had not stuck with them.

In 2024, Andrew Boyd wrote that the loss of five ships caused alarm in the Admiralty and to Admiral John Tovey, the commander of the Home Fleet, who predicted that the Germans were assembling a maximum effort against the Arctic convoys. The Naval Intelligence Division produced an accurate assessment of the German operation that gave emphasis to the German change to combined arms tactics. The storm that disrupted the convoy and the fact that only unescorted stragglers had been sunk was noted, as was the fact that the loss of a destroyer and a U-boat made the German success a costly one. The captain of Trinidad reported that the speed in which it disabled the destroyer Z 26 was due to its Type 284 radar that had worked well. The increasing numbers of aircraft and submarines would make convoys more vulnerable, especially during the forthcoming greater number of hours of daylight and better weather of the Arctic summer, when the ships would still be limited by the polar ice from sailing further from the Norwegian coast.

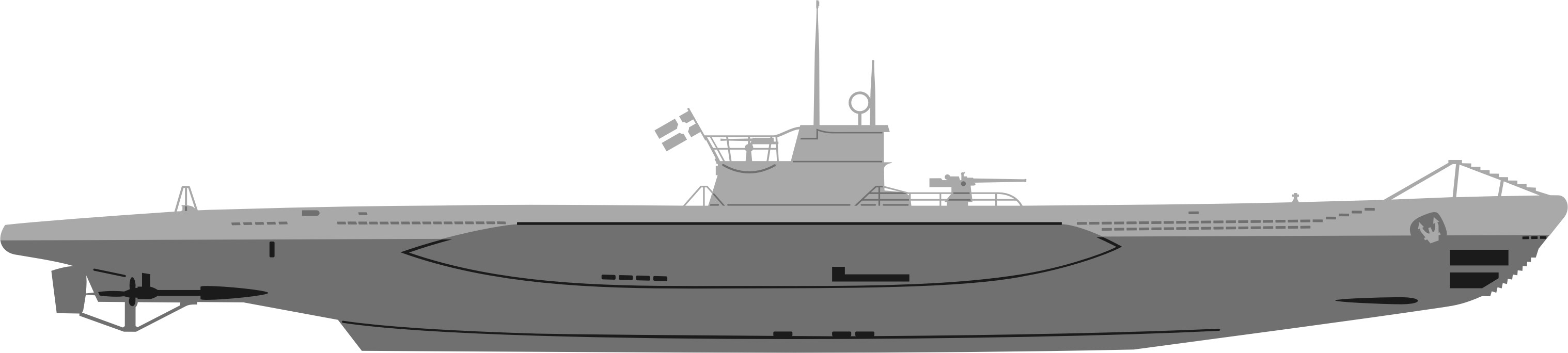
Diagram of a Type VIIC U-boat

The escort operation exposed the British lack of destroyers for convoy escort. When destroyers were screening aircraft carriers and battleships of the Home Fleet, not many were left for convoys and this was made worse by the decision that henceforth convoys must have ten escorts. Ships had been drawn from Western Approaches Command (WAC) but the Admiralty decided on a permanent policy of the WAC being responsible for finding most of the close escorts. If the Arctic convoy route maintained a 14-day departure schedule, at least 10 per cent of the destroyers of the WAC would be involved in the convoys, potentially forgoing an Atlantic convoy and its reciprocal each time. Admiral of the Fleet, Sir Dudley Pound, the professional head of the navy, had the same concerns as Tovey and on 10 April, after the departure of Convoy PQ 14, he told the other service chiefs of staff that convoys had never been dispatched against the new scale of air and submarine attack.

The advantage of geography lay with the Germans and more losses of ships and escorts could make the convoys impossible to run. In comparison with Operation Halberd (24–27 September 1941) in the Mediterranean, the sailing of fortnightly Arctic convoys put far more strain on the escorts; the ships were vulnerable to air, surface and submarine attack, the operations took place far from friendly bases and the Arctic convoys had little benefit from land-based air cover. The Soviet Northern Fleet was never able to emulate the Royal Air Force (RAF) and Fleet Air Arm (FAA) effort from Malta. Pound took the view that despite the difficulties, delivering supplies should remain a maximum effort. Boyd wrote that perhaps Pound underestimated the difficulties that the Germans faced. Kriegsmarine ships were also far from adequate anchorages and repair facilities and were suffering from an acute fuel shortage, that was well known to the British from Ultra decrypts.

The position of the British in the global war at sea was at its lowest ebb. The unreadable Shark cypher was introduced on 1 February in the Atlantic U-boats, the U-boats along the east coast of the US were enjoying the Second Happy Time, the Regia Marina had gained control over the central Mediterranean and the Imperial Japanese Navy had the Indian Ocean at its mercy. On 5 March, Pound met the defence committee and said,

If we lose the war at sea, we lose the war. We lose the war at sea when we can no longer maintain those communications which are essential to us.

when claiming more air support. A few days afterwards, the War Cabinet noted that convoy protection was an increasing problem with an increase in US ships for the Arctic route, with possibly 40 ships per month arriving at Iceland for the navy to escort to the USSR. If the 12 British ships were counted as well, this amounted to convoys of 25 ships every two weeks. The Home Fleet could escort convoys no larger than this and that it would be better to run monthly convoys. The First Protocol was due to expire in June and after the loss to Convoy QP 10 of two ships to aircraft and two to U-boats, it was agreed that the increasing danger to the convoys should be stressed o the Soviet authorities.

The German analysis of the anti-shipping operation was far from triumphant. The SKL view was that five ships sunk was insufficient compensation for the loss of Z 26 and most of its crew, given the acute shortage of destroyers. Without adequate intelligence of British naval movements and with the chronic fuel shortage there was no possibility of committing the big ships to an operation. The ease with which Trinidad had knocked out Z 26 with radar-directed gunnery was another cause for concern.

=== Casualties ===
The crew of Edinburgh suffered the loss of 57 men killed from the complement of 760 men and the destroyers lost 21 men killed and 20 wounded; the captain of Lancaster Castle was killed and three members of the crew on Foresight were wounded. The Germans sank five freighters, Trinidad was damaged and the German destroyer Z26 had been sunk. Fourteen ships had arrived safely, more than two-thirds of the convoy. The freighter SS Tobruk was credited with shooting down one bomber and another probable on 30 April. The Germans had lost U-655 on 23 March, when attacking Convoy QP 9, having been rammed by HMS Sharpshooter another Halcyon class minesweeper, that was only German attack on the convoy. U-585 was sunk on 30 March by a loose mine off the Rybachy Peninsula but mistakenly attributed to Fury and Oribi.

=== Subsequent events ===
On 3 April Luftflotte 5 began up to four bombing raids a day on Murmansk. New Westminster City was hit, set on fire and beached, with three crew killed. In June 1945 the ship was salvaged and returned to Britain. Empire Starlight was hit twice as it was being unloaded and on 1 July, the ship was hit by several bombs on the port side and settled on the bottom, its decks awash. The ship was abandoned until after the war, when it was raised by the Russians and re-named Murmansk.

== Allied order of battle ==
=== Convoyed ships ===
Loch Ewe–Reykjavík−Murmansk
Ship	Year	GRT	Flag	Notes
Loch Ewe to Reykjavík
SS Groenland	1914	1,220	Merchant Navy	Loch Ewe to Reykjavík only
Lars Kruse	1923	1,807	Merchant Navy	Loch Ewe to Reykjavík only
Manø	1925	1,418	Merchant Navy	Loch Ewe to Reykjavík only
Reykjavík to Murmansk
SS Ballot	1922	6,131	Panama	Joined Reykjavík
SS Bateau	1926	4,687	Panama	Joined Reykjavík, sunk 29 March, Z26, c. 40† 7 surv
SS Dunboyne	1919	3,515	United States	
SS Effingham	1919	6,421	United States	Straggled, sunk 30 March, U-435, 70°28′N, 35°44′E, 12† 31 surv.
SS El Estero	1920	4,219	Panama	
SS Eldena	1919	6,900	United States	
SS Empire Cowper	1941	7,164	Merchant Navy	
SS Empire Ranger	1941	7,008	Merchant Navy	Straggled, 28 March, sunk, Ju88s, 72°10′N, 30°00′E, crew POW
SS Empire Starlight	1941	6,850	Merchant Navy	Murmansk, bombed, 1 June, sunk
SS Gallant Fox	1918	5,473	Panama	
SS Harpalion	1932	5,486	Merchant Navy	
SS Induna	1925	5,086	Merchant Navy	Straggler, sunk 30 March, U-376, 70°55′N, 37°18′E, 31† 19 surv.
SS Mana	1920	3,283	Honduras	
SS Mormacmar	1939	5,453	United States	
SS New Westminster City	1929	4,747	Merchant Navy	3 April, bombed at Murmansk, beached, 3†
SS Raceland	1910	4,815	Panama	Sunk, 3 Staffel, KG 30, 72°40′N, 20°20′E, 33† 13 surv.
SS River Afton	1935	5,479	Merchant Navy	Convoy Commodore, Captain Denis Casey
SS Scottish American	1920	6,999	Merchant Navy	Joined Reykjavík, Escort oiler
HMS Silja	—	251	Royal Navy	Auxiliary minesweeper (T-107 in Soviet service)
HMS Sumba	—	251	Royal Navy	Auxiliary minesweeper (T-106 in Soviet service)
HMS Sulla	—	251	Royal Navy	Auxiliary minesweeper, sunk 1 April, U-436, c. 20†
SS Tobruk	1942	7,048	Poland	

=== Merchant ships sunk ===
After SS Ballot was attacked on 28 March 1942, 16 members of the crew launched a lifeboat, were taken on board Silja and then transferred to Induna.

Allied shipping losses
Date	Ship	GRT	Flag	Arm	Notes
Merchant ships sunk
28 March	Raceland	4,815	Panama	Luftwaffe	72°40′N 20°20′E, 33† 13 surv.
28 March	Empire Ranger	7,008	Merchant Navy	Luftwaffe	72°10′N 30°00′E 55 crew, 0†
29 March	Bateau	4,687	Panama	Kriegsmarine	Sunk, Z26, 72°30′N 27°00′E 47 crew, 6†, 41 surv.
30 March	Induna	5,086	Merchant Navy	Kriegsmarine	Sunk, U-376, 70°55′N 37°18′E 66 crew, 42† (Note: Twelve were from SS Ballot.)
30 March	Effingham	6,421	United States	Kriegsmarine	Sunk, U-435, 70°28′N 35°44′E 42 crew, 12 surv.
1 April	HMT Sulla	—	Royal Navy	Kriegsmarine	Sunk, U-436
Merchant ships lost in harbour or Convoy QP 10
3 April	Empire Starlight	6,850	Merchant Navy	Luftwaffe	Bombed, 3 April – 1 June, Murmansk, 68 crew, 1†
3 April	New Westminster City	4,747	Merchant Navy	Luftwaffe	Bombed at Murmansk, 52 crew, 2†
11 April	Empire Cowper	7,164	Merchant Navy	Luftwaffe	Sunk, Convoy QP 10, 68 crew, 18† + 1
13 April	Harpalion	5,486	Merchant Navy	Kriegsmarine	Sunk, U-435, Convoy QP 10, 52 crew, 0†

=== Escorts ===
Escort forces (in relays)
Name	Navy	Class	Notes
Loch Ewe to Reykjavík
ORP Błyskawica	Polish Navy	Grom-class destroyer	10–17 March
HMS Lamerton	Royal Navy	Hunt-class destroyer	10–16 March
HMS Sabre	Royal Navy	S-class destroyer	11–17 March
HMS Saladin	Royal Navy	S-class destroyer	11–17 March
Reykjavík to Murmansk
HMS Trinidad	Royal Navy	Fiji-class cruiser	23–25 March
HMS Eclipse	Royal Navy	E-class destroyer	Joined 23 March
HMS Fury	Royal Navy	F-class destroyer	Joined 23 March
HMS Lamerton	Royal Navy	Hunt-class destroyer	23–25 March
HMS Wheatland	Royal Navy	Hunt-class destroyer	detached 23 March
HMT Bute	Royal Navy	Isles-class trawler	
HMT Celia	Royal Navy	Shakespearian-class trawler	
HMT Blackfly	Royal Navy	ASW Trawler	Joined 23 March
HMT Paynter	Royal Navy	ASW Trawler	Joined 23 March
Distant cover (Home Fleet)
HMS Victorious	Royal Navy	Illustrious-class aircraft carrier	
HMS King George V	Royal Navy	King George V-class battleship	
HMS Duke of York	Royal Navy	King George V-class battleship	
HMS Renown	Royal Navy	Renown-class battlecruiser	
HMS Kent	Royal Navy	County-class cruiser	
HMS Edinburgh	Royal Navy	Town-class cruiser	
HMS Ashanti	Royal Navy	Tribal-class destroyer	
HMS Bedouin	Royal Navy	Tribal-class destroyer	
HMS Eskimo	Royal Navy	Tribal-class destroyer	
HMS Punjabi	Royal Navy	Tribal-class destroyer	
HMS Tartar	Royal Navy	Tribal-class destroyer	
HMS Echo	Royal Navy	E-class destroyer	
HMS Escapade	Royal Navy	E-class destroyer	
HMS Faulknor	Royal Navy	F-class destroyer	
HMS Foresight	Royal Navy	F-class destroyer	
HMS Icarus	Royal Navy	I-class destroyer	
HMS Inglefield	Royal Navy	I-class destroyer	
HMS Marne	Royal Navy	M-class destroyer	
HMS Onslow	Royal Navy	O-class destroyer	
HMS Ledbury	Royal Navy	Hunt-class destroyer	
HMS Middleton	Royal Navy	Hunt-class destroyer	
HMS Wheatland	Royal Navy	Hunt-class destroyer	
Eastern local escort
Gremyashchy	Soviet Navy	Gnevny-class destroyer	27 March
Sokrushitelny	Soviet Navy	Gnevny-class destroyer	27 March
HMS Oribi	Royal Navy	O-class destroyer	29 March, found boats of Empire Ranger, sighted Silja adrift
HMS Harrier	Royal Navy	Halcyon-class minesweeper	28 March
HMS Hussar	Royal Navy	Halcyon-class minesweeper	28 March
HMS Gossamer	Royal Navy	Halcyon-class minesweeper	30 March, found Scottish American, Effingham and Dunboyne
HMS Speedwell	Royal Navy	Halcyon-class minesweeper	28 March

=== Force Q ===
Fleet oiler and escort
Name	Navy	Class	Notes
Reykjavík to Murmansk
HMS Lamerton	Royal Navy	Hunt-class destroyer	23–25 March
RFA Oligarch	United Kingdom	Ol-class tanker	6,897 GRT, fleet oiler

== German order of battle ==
=== U-boats ===
U-boats operating near Bear Island
Name	Flag	Class	Notes
gruppe Ziethen
U-435	Kriegsmarine	Type VIIC submarine	
U-436	Kriegsmarine	Type VIIC submarine	
U-454	Kriegsmarine	Type VIIC submarine	
U-456	Kriegsmarine	Type VIIC submarine	
U-585	Kriegsmarine	Type VIIC submarine	
U-589	Kriegsmarine	Type VIIC submarine	

=== Destroyers ===
German ships
Name	Flag	Class	Notes
Z24	Kriegsmarine	Type 1936A-class destroyer	
Z25	Kriegsmarine	Type 1936A-class destroyer	
Z26	Kriegsmarine	Type 1936A-class destroyer	29 March, sank Bateau, sunk Trinidad 243† 96 surv.

== Bibliography ==
- Blair, Clay (1996). Hitler's U-Boat War: The Hunters 1939–42. Vol. I. London: Cassell. ISBN 0-304-35260-8.
- Boyd, Andrew (2024). Arms for Russia & the Naval War in the Arctic 1941–1945. Barnsley: Seaforth (Pen & Sword). ISBN 978-1-3990-3886-7.
- Claasen, A. R. A. (2001). Hitler's Northern War: The Luftwaffe's Ill-fated Campaign, 1940–1945. Lawrence, KS: University Press of Kansas. ISBN 0-7006-1050-2.
- Edgerton, D. (2011). Britain's War Machine: Weapons, Resources and Experts in the Second World War. London: Allen Lane. ISBN 978-0-7139-9918-1.
- Gothro, Phil (2017). "SS Bateau". wrecksite.eu.
- Hinsley, F. H.; et al. (1981). British Intelligence in the Second World War. Its Influence on Strategy and Operations. History of the Second World War. Vol. II. London: HMSO. ISBN 0-11-630934-2.
- Hinsley, F. H. (1994) [1993]. British Intelligence in the Second World War: Its Influence on Strategy and Operations. History of the Second World War (2nd rev. abr. ed.). London: HMSO. ISBN 978-0-11-630961-7.
- "HMT Sulla". Wrecksite.eu. 6 December 2020.
- Howard, M. (1972). Grand Strategy: August 1942 – September 1943. History of the Second World War United Kingdom Military Series. Vol. IV. London: HMSO. ISBN 978-0-11-630075-1.
- Jordan, Roger W. (2006) [1999]. The World's Merchant Fleets 1939: The Particulars and Wartime Fates of 6,000 Ships (2nd ed.). London: Chatham/Lionel Leventhal. ISBN 978-1-86176-293-1.
- Kahn, D. (1973) [1967]. The Codebreakers: The Story of Secret Writing (10th abr. Signet, Chicago ed.). New York: Macmillan. LCCN 63-16109. OCLC 78083316.
- Kemp, Paul (1999) [1997]. U-boats Destroyed: German Submarine Losses in the World Wars. London: Arms & Armour press. ISBN 978-1-85-409515-2.
- Kenyon, David (2023). Arctic Convoys: Bletchley Park and the War for the Seas. New Haven & London: Yale University Press. ISBN 978-0-300-27501-8.
- Macksey, K. (2004) [2003]. The Searchers: Radio Intercept in two World Wars (Cassell Military Paperbacks ed.). London: Cassell. ISBN 978-0-304-36651-4.
- Miciński, Jerzy; Huras, Bohdan; Twardowski, Marek (1999). Księga statków polskich 1918–1945. Tom 3 [Polish Ships Book 1918–1945] (in Polish). Vol. III. Gdańsk: Polnord Wydawnictwo Oskar. ISBN 83-86181-45-1.
- Mitchell, W. H.; Sawyer, L. A. (1990) [1965]. The Empire Ships: A Record of British-built and acquired Merchant Ships during the Second World War (2nd ed.). London (New York, Hamburg, Hong Kong): Lloyd's of London Press. ISBN 1-85044-275-4.
- Rohwer, Jürgen; Hümmelchen, Gerhard (2005) [1972]. Chronology of the War at Sea, 1939–1945: The Naval History of World War Two (3rd rev. ed.). London: Chatham. ISBN 1-86176-257-7.
- Ruegg, R.; Hague, A. (1993) [1992]. Convoys to Russia: Allied Convoys and Naval Surface Operations in Arctic Waters 1941–1945 (2nd rev. enl. ed.). Kendal: World Ship Society. ISBN 0-905617-66-5.
- "Russian Convoys Series". ConvoyWeb. 2025.
- "SS Bateau". Wrecksite.eu. 22 February 2009.
- Woodman, Richard (1994). Arctic Convoys 1941–1945 (Hardback ed.). London: John Murray. ISBN 0-7195-5079-3.
- Woodman, Richard (2004) [1994]. Arctic Convoys 1941–1945. London: John Murray. ISBN 978-0-7195-5752-1.
