= Soviet destroyer Gremyashchy (1937) =

Destroyer of the Soviet Navy

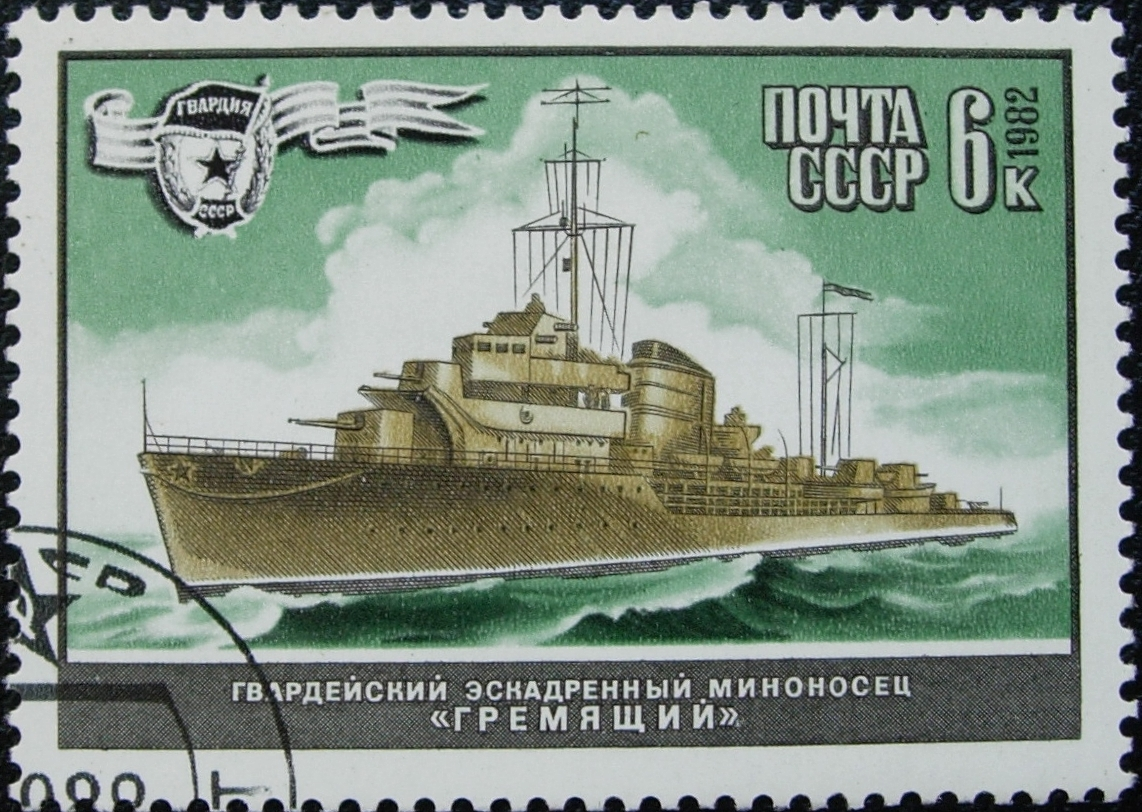
- Gremyashchy as depicted on a 1982 postage stamp

History

Soviet Union
- Name: Gremyashchy (Гремящий [Thunderous])
- Builder: Shipyard No. 190 (Zhdanov), Leningrad
- Laid down: 23 July 1936
- Launched: 12 August 1937
- Completed: 28 August 1938
- Commissioned: 30 August 1938
- Renamed: OS-5, 27 December 1956
- Reclassified: As a test ship, 27 December 1956
- Stricken: 3 April 1956
- Fate: Scuttled, October 1957

General characteristics (Gnevny as completed, 1938)
- Class & type: Gnevny-class destroyer
- Displacement: 1,612 t (1,587 long tons) (standard)
- Length: 112.8 m (370 ft 1 in) (o/a)
- Beam: 10.2 m (33 ft 6 in)
- Draft: 4.8 m (15 ft 9 in)
- Installed power: 3 water-tube boilers; 48,000 shp (36,000 kW)
- Propulsion: 2 shafts; 2 geared steam turbines
- Speed: 38 knots (70 km/h; 44 mph)
- Range: 2,720 nmi (5,040 km; 3,130 mi) at 19 knots (35 km/h; 22 mph)
- Complement: 197 (236 wartime)
- Sensors & processing systems: Mars hydrophone
- Armament: 4 × single 130 mm (5.1 in) guns; 2 × single 76.2 mm (3 in) AA guns; 2 × single 45 mm (1.8 in) AA guns; 2 × single 12.7 mm (0.50 in) AA machineguns; 2 × triple 533 mm (21 in) torpedo tubes; 60–96 mines; 2 × depth charge racks, 25 depth charges

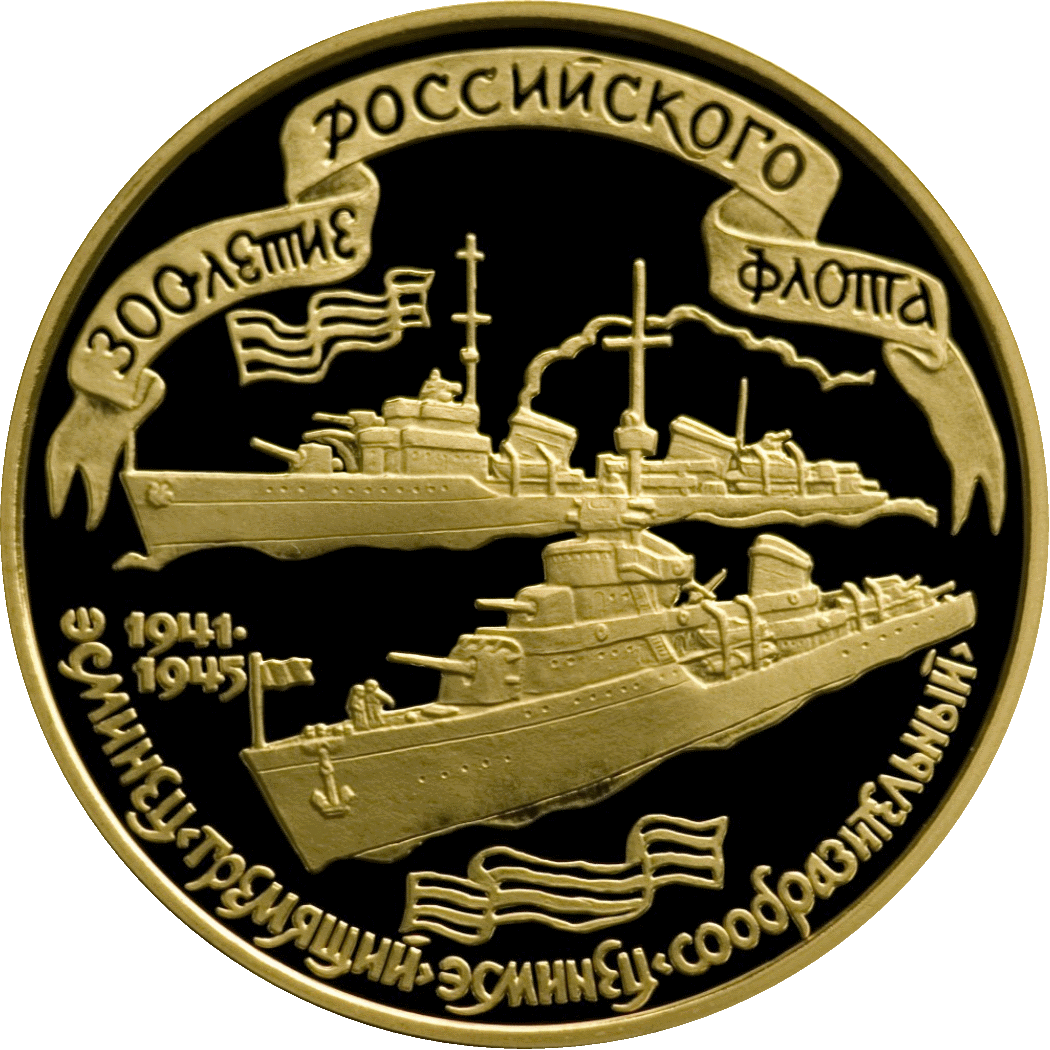
Gremyashchy as depicted on a limited edition 100-ruble coin, from the 300th Anniversary of the Russian Navy coin series

Gremyashchy (Russian: Гремящий, lit. 'Thunderous') was one of 29 Gnevny-class destroyers (officially known as Project 7) built for the Soviet Navy during the late 1930s. Completed in 1939, she was assigned to the Baltic Fleet and was later transferred to the Northern Fleet in 1941.

== Design and description ==
Having decided to build the large and expensive 40-knot (74 km/h; 46 mph) Leningrad-class destroyer leaders, the Soviet Navy sought Italian assistance in designing smaller and cheaper destroyers. They licensed the plans for the Folgore class and, in modifying it for their purposes, overloaded a design that was already somewhat marginally stable.

The Gnevnys had an overall length of 112.8 meters (370 ft 1 in), a beam of 10.2 meters (33 ft 6 in), and a draft of 4.8 meters (15 ft 9 in) at deep load. The ships were significantly overweight, almost 200 metric tons (197 long tons) heavier than designed, displacing 1,612 metric tons (1,587 long tons) at standard load and 2,039 metric tons (2,007 long tons) at deep load. Their crew numbered 197 officers and sailors in peacetime and 236 in wartime. The ships had a pair of geared steam turbines, each driving one propeller, rated to produce 48,000 shaft horsepower (36,000 kW) using steam from three water-tube boilers which was intended to give them a maximum speed of 37 knots (69 km/h; 43 mph). The designers had been conservative in rating the turbines and many, but not all, of the ships handily exceeded their designed speed during their sea trials. Others fell considerably short of it. Gremyashchy reached 37 knots (69 km/h; 43 mph) during trials in 1942. Variations in fuel oil capacity meant that the range of the Gnevnys varied between 1,670 to 3,145 nautical miles (3,093 to 5,825 km; 1,922 to 3,619 mi) at 19 knots (35 km/h; 22 mph). Gremyashchy herself demonstrated a range of 1,670 nmi (3,090 km; 1,920 mi) at that speed.

As built, the Gnevny-class ships mounted four 130-millimeter (5.1 in) B-13 guns in two pairs of superfiring single mounts fore and aft of the superstructure. Anti-aircraft defense was provided by a pair of 76.2-millimeter (3 in) 34-K AA guns in single mounts and a pair of 45-millimeter (1.8 in) 21-K AA guns as well as two 12.7-millimeter (0.50 in) DK or DShK machine guns. They carried six 533 mm (21 in) torpedo tubes in two rotating triple mounts; each tube was provided with a reload. The ships could also carry a maximum of either 60 or 95 mines and 25 depth charges. They were fitted with a set of Mars hydrophones for anti-submarine work, although they were useless at speeds over 3 knots (5.6 km/h; 3.5 mph). The ships were equipped with two K-1 paravanes intended to destroy mines and a pair of depth-charge throwers.

== Construction and service ==
Built in Leningrad's Shipyard No. 190 (Zhdanov) as yard number 514, Gremyashchy was laid down on 23 July 1936, launched on 12 August 1937. The ship was completed on 28 August 1938 and was commissioned into the Baltic Fleet two days later.

During the Winter War between the Soviet Union and Finland, Gremyashchy was assigned to performing patrol duties and escorting transport ships, and did not participate in any battles.

Following the entry of the Soviet Union into World War II, she was moved to Vaenga by order of the commander of the fleet, and began her first patrols on 24 June 1941, escorting the transport ships Mossovet and Tsiolkovskiy from Murmansk to Titovka. On 22 August 1941, alongside destroyers Uritsky, Kuibyshev and Gromkiy, Gremyashchy protected the damaged depot ship Maria Ulyanova after she was hit by a torpedo attack from a German submarine. At the same time, Gremyashchy repelled a German air attack, shooting down one aircraft in the process.

During the evening of 24 and 25 November 1941, she fired eighty-nine 130 mm shells at the Norwegian port of Vardø, alongside destroyer Gromky and the British light cruiser HMS Kenya. From 24 to 28 January 1942, she participated in escorting Convoy QP 6, and was held for repairs for the 15 days following 5 February 1942. On 21 February 1942, she shelled enemy positions from Ara on the Kola Peninsula near the Barents Sea. Later in March, she took part in escorting convoys QP 8 and PQ 12. While escorting Convoy QP 9 on 22 March 1942, a severe storm damaged the upper deck, boiler casing and drinking water pipeline of the ship.

On 29 March, Gremyashchy and the destroyer Sokrushitelny were escorting Convoy PQ 13 when they came under fire from German destroyer Z26, and opened fire in retaliation; Sokrushitelny was able to damage the boiler room of Z26, however due to poor visibility the German destroyer was able to escape. Later, German destroyers Z24 and Z25 began attacking British ships, however were fired upon by HMS Trinidad, Gremyashchy and Sokrushitelny, and withdrew.

On 30 March 1942 Gremyashchy detected an unidentified enemy submarine and released twelve depth charges. During April 1942, she was involved with escorting convoys QP 10, PQ 14 and QP 11. On 30 April, she accompanied the damaged HMS Edinburgh, however was forced to return to base on 1 May due to a lack of fuel. She attempted to return to HMS Edinburgh on 2 May after being re-supplied, however by then Edinburgh had already sunk. On 5–6 May, she participated in escorting Convoy PQ 15.

On 8 May 1942, Gremyashchy provided fire support for troop landings at Cape Pikshuev, and on 23 August, accompanied a detachment of warships at Kola Bay alongside Sokrushitelny. Between 25 and 27 August, she escorted the transport ship Dixon to Belushya Guba. Later during 17–20 September, she participated in Convoy PQ 18. She was then held for repairs from 16 January 1943 to 29 April 1943.

In 1943 she took part in 18 escort missions within the Arctic Sea region. On 12 October 1943, the cargo ship Marina Raskova lost steering control as a result of stormy weather, and was towed by Gremyashchy. On 29 October, Gremyashchy was struck by the anchor of transport ship Kanin and required emergency repairs. During 8–12 November, she participated in escorting Convoy BC 21, and later stood for repairs between 19 November 1943 and January 15, 1944.

During 21–22 January, Gremyashchy took part in an unsuccessful interception mission against an enemy convoy near Makkur. From 27 January to 3 October, she took part in 17 escort missions. On 9 October, Gremyashchy and Gromky provided support for a troop landing operation, and on the 10th and 11th the same month shelled German troop positions at the river near Titovka. Participated in a bombardment of the Norwegian towns of Vardø and Vadsø on 26 October, during the Petsamo–Kirkenes Offensive. Norwegian fishing boat Spurven was sunk at Vardo. After a series of seven escort missions between 16 October and 8 December, Gremyashchy began an overhaul at Molotovsk Factory No. 402 on 14 December 1944.

== Sources ==
- Balakin, Sergey (2007). Легендарные "семёрки" Эсминцы "сталинской" серии [Legendary Sevens: Stalin's Destroyer Series] (in Russian). Moscow: Yauza/Eksmo. ISBN 978-5-699-23784-5.
- Berezhnoy, Sergey (2002). Крейсера и миноносцы. Справочник [Guide to Cruisers and Destroyers] (in Russian). Moscow: Voenizdat. ISBN 5-203-01780-8.
- Budzbon, Przemysaw (1980). "Soviet Union". In Chesneau, Roger (ed.). Conway's All the World's Fighting Ships 1922–1946. Greenwich, UK: Conway Maritime Press. pp. 318–346. ISBN 0-85177-146-7.
- Hill, Alexander (2018). Soviet Destroyers of World War II. New Vanguard. Vol. 256. Oxford, UK: Osprey Publishing. ISBN 978-1-4728-2256-7.
- Platonov, Andrey V. (2002). Энциклопедия советских надводных кораблей 1941–1945 [Encyclopedia of Soviet Surface Ships 1941–1945] (in Russian). Saint Petersburg: Poligon. ISBN 5-89173-178-9.
- Rohwer, Jürgen (2005). Chronology of the War at Sea 1939–1945: The Naval History of World War Two (Third Revised ed.). Annapolis, Maryland: Naval Institute Press. ISBN 1-59114-119-2.
- Rohwer, Jürgen & Monakov, Mikhail S. (2001). Stalin's Ocean-Going Fleet. London: Frank Cass. ISBN 0-7146-4895-7.
- Yakubov, Vladimir & Worth, Richard (2008). "The Soviet Project 7/7U Destroyers". In Jordan, John & Dent, Stephen (eds.). Warship 2008. London: Conway. pp. 99–114. ISBN 978-1-84486-062-3.
