= Soviet destroyer Sokrushitelny =

Sokrushitelny (Russian: Сокрушительный, lit. 'Destructive') is the name of the following ships of the Soviet Navy:

- Soviet destroyer Sokrushitelny (1937), a Gnevny-class destroyer, sunk during a storm in 1942
- Soviet destroyer Sokrushitelny (1949), a Skory-class destroyer
