= SS Narwik =

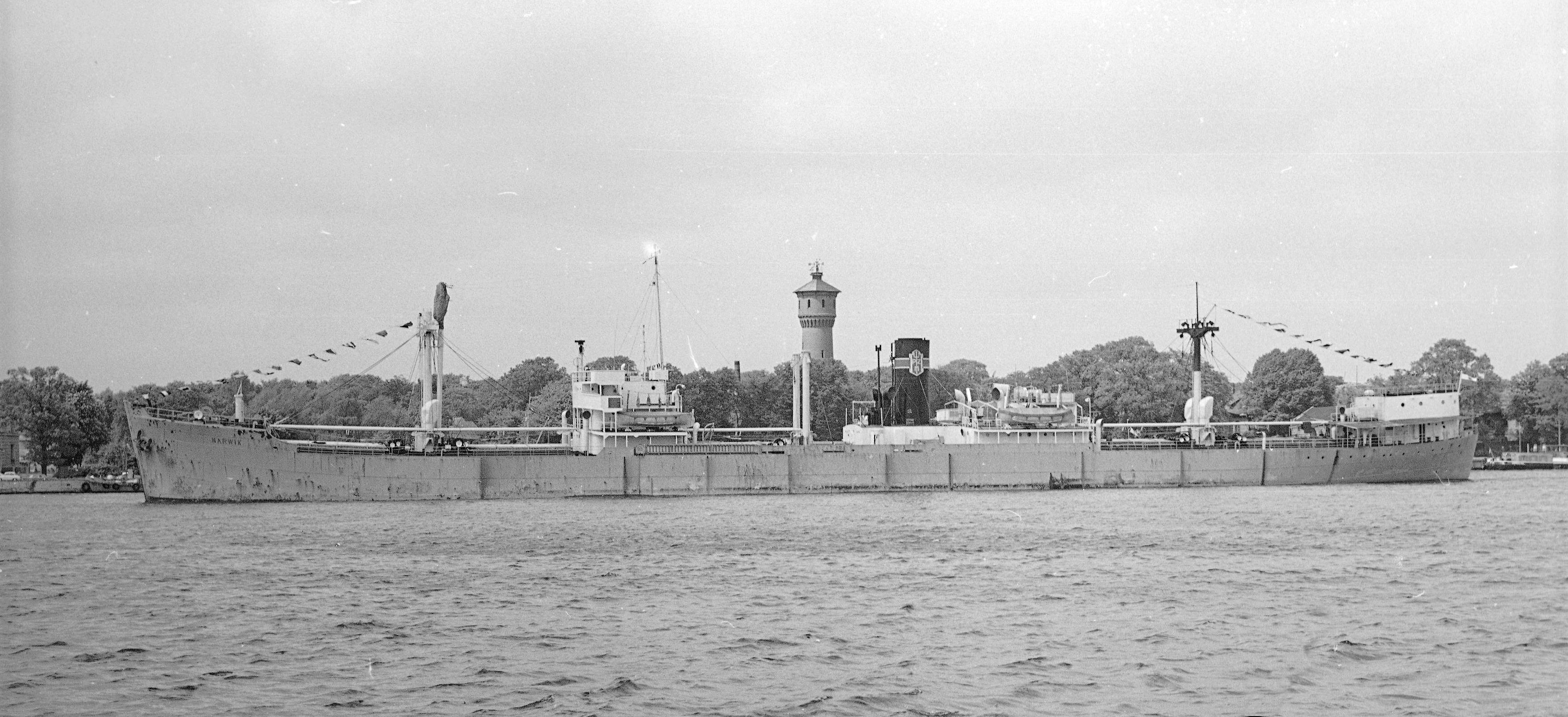

History

Poland
- Name: Narwik
- Namesake: Battle of Narvik
- Owner: Gdynia-America Line, then Polish Ocean Lines
- Port of registry: Gdynia
- Builder: Charles Connell and Company
- Launched: 5 January 1942
- Commissioned: 11 March 1943
- Out of service: 1972
- Fate: Scrapped, 1970s

General characteristics
- Tonnage: 7031 GRT; 4967 NRT
- Length: 136 meters (446 ft)
- Speed: 10 knots (19 km/h; 12 mph)
- Crew: 41

SS Narwik, formerly Empire Roamer, was a Polish general cargo ship built in 1941 to the order of the British government, as one of the Empire B type ships. In 1942, together with four others (Tobruk, Bałtyk, Białystok, Borysław - since 1950 Bytom), it was transferred to the Polish Government in Exile for the Polish Merchant Navy. In Polish service, the name of the ship was changed to "Narwik" to commemorate the Polish contribution to the Battle of Narvik. The transferred ships formally became the property of GAL (Gdynia-America Shipping Lines), but they were chartered to the War Transport Administration. Narwik sailed under the Polish flag to 1972.

Empire Roamer was built by Charles Connell and Company in Glasgow and launched on 5 January 1942. On 11 March 1942 she was sold by Ministry of War Transport to Polish government, and was commissioned from the shipyard on that day. Her first captain was Tadeusz Niefiedowicz. On 17 March 1942 the ship went on her maiden voyage in a conwoy from Gourock to New York City. On 30 April she departed back for Cape Town, and then to Bombay, and back to Durban. On the way to Durban the crew spent several days fighting coal fire in bunkers, finally extinguished in the port.

On October 10, 1942, during a cruise to the United States from Durban, Narwik encountered lifeboats from the SS Orcades that was torpedoed by the German submarine U-172. Despite possible threat by the German submarine, a rescue operation was launched, which resulted in 1022 survivors being taken on board in several hours, from over 20 boats, including women and children. On the way with survivors to Cape Town, at night, the Narwik located also missing lifeboats with a captain of Orcades and volunteers, who had been trying to save sinking ship. It was the most effective and largest rescue action carried out by one ship during the Second World War. At that time, the ship was commanded by its First Officer Czesław Zawada, because the captain had to disembark before the cruise due to illness. Czesław Zawada and his crew were honored with Polish and British decorations for the rescue operation, including Lloyd's War Medal for Bravery at Sea for the captain.

During the war, the ship took part in further convoys and military operations, including landing in Sicily in July 1943. On 29 July 1946, the ship returned to Poland from where it continued to make transatlantic voyages. From 1951 the Narwik became part of Polish Ocean Lines fleet. Since 1967 she sailed in a charter in Polish-Korean company Korpol. On 16 February 1972 she was sold for scrap to Spain. On 8 March 1972 she entered breakers yard in Bilbao.
