= SS Tobruk =

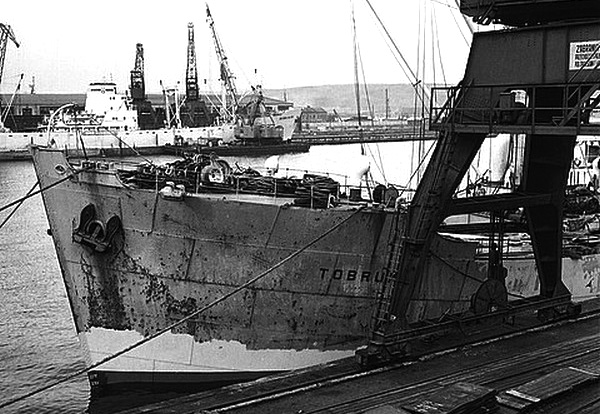
- SS Tobruk after the War

History
- Name: Empire Builder (1941–42); Tobruk (1942–68)
- Namesake: Defence of Tobruk
- Owner: Ministry of War Transport (1941–42); Polish Government (1942–51); Polskie Linie Oceaniczne (1951–67); Polsteam (1967)
- Operator: Gdynia America Line(1942–51); Polskie Linie Oceaniczne (1951–67); Polsteam (1967)
- Port of registry: (United Kingdom) West Hartlepool (1941–42); Gdynia (1942–68)
- Builder: William Gray & Co Ltd
- Yard number: 1123
- Launched: 19 November 1941
- Completed: January 1942
- Commissioned: 30 January 1942
- Out of service: November 1967
- Identification: IMO Number 5616130 (-1968)
- Fate: Scrapped June 1968

General characteristics
- Tonnage: 7,090 GRT (Empire Builder); 7,048 (Tobruk); 5,050 NRT (Empire Builder); 4,977 NRT (Tobruk); 10,400 DWT (Tobruk)
- Length: 430 ft (131.06 m)
- Beam: 56 ft 2 in (17.12 m)
- Depth: 35 ft 2 in (10.72 m)
- Propulsion: 1 x triple expansion steam engine
- Speed: 9.5 knots (17.6 km/h)

Tobruk was a 7,090 GRT cargo ship which was built in 1941 as Empire Builder by William Gray & Company Ltd for the Ministry of War Transport (MoWT). On completion she was handed over to the Polish government-in-exile (along with four others; Narwik, Bałtyk, Białystok and Borysław, which in 1950 was renamed to Bytom) and renamed Tobruk. She was a member of a number of convoys during the Second World War. She was sold in 1951 to Polskie Linie Oceaniczne and served until 1967. She was scrapped in 1968.

== Description ==
Empire Builder was built by William Gray & Sons Ltd, West Hartlepool. She was yard number 1123. Empire Builder was launched on 19 November 1941 and completed in January 1942.

The ship was 430 feet (131.06 m) long, with a beam of 56 feet 2 inches (17.12 m) and a depth of 35 feet 2 inches (10.72 m). She was propelled by a triple expansion steam engine which had cylinders of 24 1/2 inches (62 cm), 42 inches (110 cm) and 70 inches (180 cm) bore by 48 inches (120 cm) stroke. The engine was built by Central Marine Engine Works, West Hartlepool. It could propel her at 9.5 knots (17.6 km/h) Empire Builder was listed on Lloyds Register as having a GRT of 7,090 and a NRT of 5,050. Tobruk was listed on Lloyds Register as having a GRT of 7,048 and a NRT of 4,977. Her DWT was 10,500.

== Career ==
Empire Builder's port of registry was West Hartlepool. On completion, she was handed over to the Polish Government on 30 January 1942 and renamed Tobruk, after participation of Polish Independent Carpathian Rifle Brigade in defence of Tobruk. Her port of registry was changed to Gdynia. Tobruk was owned by the Polish government and operated under the management of Gdynia America Line, in charter of War Transport Administration. The first captain was Bronisław Hurko.

=== Convoy PQ 13 ===
Convoy PQ 13 departed Loch Ewe on 10 March 1942 and arrived at Murmansk, Soviet Union on 31 March having lost six ships to enemy action. A further two were sunk at Murmansk after the convoy's arrival. The convoy dispersed in a snow storm on 25 March, and Tobruk travelled alone since then. On 30 March, near Murmansk, she was attacked by German bombers Junkers Ju 88 and was credited with shooting down one bomber and one probable. She was hit by one bomb, which pierced a deck and went out through a board, exploding in a water, instead of in a cargo hold with explosives. However, on 3 April Tobruk was sunk by a pier in Murmansk by enemy bomb, which flooded stern holds. On 24 April she was refloated, towed away and stranded. Thanks to a dedication of the crew, the ship was kept partly afloat for several months, and provisionally repaired in Murmansk dock by September only. The repairs were hampered by enemy bombings, which killed one crewman.

=== Convoy QP 14 ===
Convoy QP 14 departed Murmansk on 13 September 1942 and arrived at Loch Ewe on 26 September, having lost four ships to enemy action. Tobruk was carrying a cargo of Apatite. She departed Murmansk on 8 September bound for Arkhangelsk, from where she joined the convoy. Tobruk arrived safely, although with leaks due to depth charges. Crew members were joking later that the convoy departed on the 13th day of the month, the trip lasted 13 days, and Tobruk had the thirteenth position in the convoy.

=== Convoy SL 178 ===
Convoy SL 178 departed Freetown, Sierra Leone on 25 November 1944 and arrived at Liverpool on 15 December. Tobruk was on a voyage from Pepel to Barry, Glamorgan. She was carrying a cargo of iron ore and two passengers. On 9 December, a deceased seaman from Tobruk was buried at sea.

=== Postwar ===
Postwar, Tobruk continued in Polish Government service. On 21 June 1946, the ship entered her home port Gdynia in Poland for the first time. After disbanding of Gdynia Ameryka Line, from 1951 the Tobruk became part of Polish Ocean Lines fleet. In 1950 during a storm in the Bay of Biscay in order to prevent the ship from crashing into the local reefs the crew improvised a sail, saving the ship; this is the only known example of a modern bulk carrier using a sail. In June 1967 Tobruk was transferred to other Polish state-owned operator, Polska Żegluga Morska (Polsteam) but was stricken already in November 1967. She was scrapped at Gdynia by June 1968.

== In popular culture ==
The wartime history of the ship has been portrayed in a novel S.S. Tobruk – w konwojach śmierci (SS Tobruk – in the convoys of death) by Jan Kazimierz Sawicki.
