= Soviet destroyer Sokrushitelny (1937) =

Destroyer of the Soviet Navy

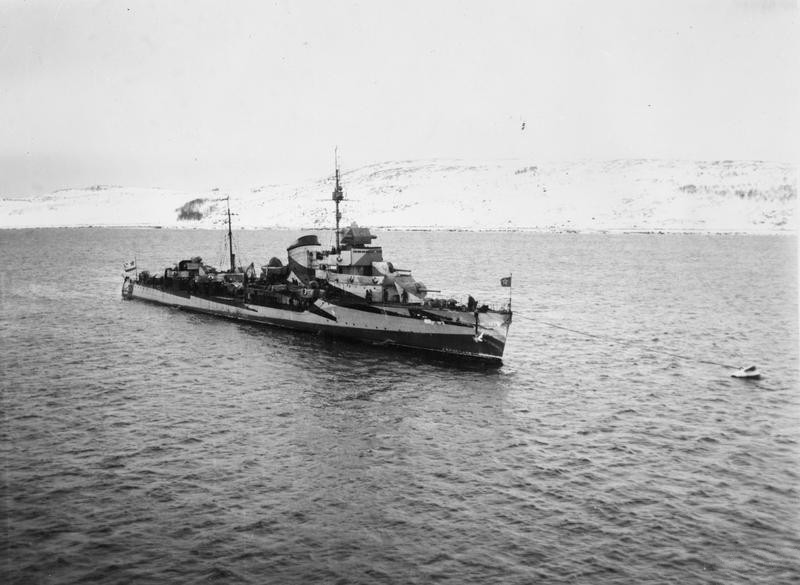
- Aerial view of sister ship Razumny, March 1944

History

Soviet Union
- Name: Sokrushitelny (Сокрушительный (Destructive))
- Ordered: 2nd Five-Year Plan
- Builder: Shipyard No. 189 (Ordzhonikidze), Leningrad
- Laid down: 29 October 1936
- Launched: 23 August 1937
- Completed: 13 August 1939
- Fate: Sunk during a storm, 21 November 1942

General characteristics (Gnevny as completed, 1938)
- Class & type: Gnevny-class destroyer
- Displacement: 1,612 t (1,587 long tons) (standard)
- Length: 112.8 m (370 ft 1 in) (o/a)
- Beam: 10.2 m (33 ft 6 in)
- Draft: 4.8 m (15 ft 9 in)
- Installed power: 3 water-tube boilers; 48,000 shp (36,000 kW)
- Propulsion: 2 shafts; 2 geared steam turbines
- Speed: 37 knots (69 km/h; 43 mph) (designed)
- Range: 1,670–3,145 nmi (3,093–5,825 km; 1,922–3,619 mi) at 19 knots (35 km/h; 22 mph)
- Complement: 197 (236 wartime)
- Sensors & processing systems: Mars hydrophone
- Armament: 4 × single 130 mm (5.1 in) guns; 2 × single 76.2 mm (3 in) AA guns; 2 × single 45 mm (1.8 in) AA guns; 2 × single 12.7 mm (0.50 in) AA machineguns; 2 × triple 533 mm (21 in) torpedo tubes; 60–96 mines; 2 × depth charge racks, 25 depth charges

Sokrushitelny (Russian: Сокрушительный, lit. 'Destructive') was one of 29 Gnevny-class destroyers (officially known as Project 7) built for the Soviet Navy during the late 1930s. Completed in 1939, she was initially assigned to the Baltic Fleet before she was transferred to the Northern Fleet in late 1939. After the Axis invasion of the Soviet Union in June 1941, the ship laid several minefields in the White and Barents Seas. Sokrushitelny spent most of her service escorting the Arctic Convoys, run by the British to provide weapons and supplies to the Soviets, or providing naval gunfire support to Soviet troops along the Arctic coast. The ship engaged a German ship just once, while defending Convoy QP 13 in early 1942. While escorting Convoy QP 15 in November, she sank during a severe storm after breaking in half. Most of her crew was rescued by other destroyers sent to her aid, although 35 crewmen were lost.

== Design and description ==
Having decided to build the large and expensive 40-knot (74 km/h; 46 mph) Leningrad-class destroyer leaders, the Soviet Navy sought Italian assistance in designing smaller and cheaper destroyers. They licensed the plans for the Folgore class and, in modifying it for their purposes, overloaded a design that was already somewhat marginally stable.

The Gnevnys had an overall length of 112.8 meters (370 ft 1 in), a beam of 10.2 meters (33 ft 6 in), and a draft of 4.8 meters (15 ft 9 in) at deep load. The ships were overweight, almost 200 metric tons (197 long tons) heavier than designed, displacing 1,612 metric tons (1,587 long tons) at standard load and 2,039 metric tons (2,007 long tons) at deep load. Their crew numbered 197 officers and sailors in peacetime and 236 in wartime. The ships had a pair of geared steam turbines, each driving one propeller, rated to produce a total of 48,000 shaft horsepower (36,000 kW) using steam from three water-tube boilers.

The designers had been conservative in rating the turbines that were intended to give them a maximum speed of 37 knots (69 km/h; 43 mph). Many of the ships handily exceeded their designed speed during their sea trials. Others fell considerably short of it, although figures for most ships have not survived. Variations in fuel oil capacity meant that the range of the Gnevnys varied between 1,670 to 3,145 nautical miles (3,093 to 5,825 km; 1,922 to 3,619 mi) at 19 knots (35 km/h; 22 mph).

As built, the Gnevny-class ships mounted four 130-millimeter (5.1 in) B-13 guns in two pairs of superfiring single mounts fore and aft of the superstructure. Anti-aircraft defense was provided by a pair of 76.2-millimeter (3 in) 34-K AA guns and a pair of 45-millimeter (1.8 in) 21-K AA guns as well as two 12.7-millimeter (0.50 in) DK or DShK machine guns, all in single mounts. During the war, Sokrushitelny's anti-aircraft suite was reinforced with the addition of a pair of 37-millimeter (1.5 in) 70-K guns in single mounts in mid-1941 and her 45-mm 21-K guns were removed in early 1942.

The ships carried six 533 mm (21 in) torpedo tubes in two rotating triple mounts; each tube was provided with a reload. They were equipped with two K-1 paravanes intended to destroy mines and could lay mines themselves if the depth charges were off-loaded. Their capacity varied with the type of mine, from sixty 1,065-kilogram (2,348 lb) KB types to sixty-five 960-kilogram (2,120 lb) Model 1926s, or ninety-six 600-kilogram (1,300 lb) Model 1912 mines. For anti-submarine work, the Gnevnys were fitted with two stern racks for ten 135-kilogram (298 lb) BB-1 and fifteen 25-kilogram (55 lb) BM-1 depth charges. Sokrushitelny may have been fitted with a pair of BMB-1 depth charge throwers before her loss in 1942. They were also equipped with a set of Mars hydrophones although they were useless at speeds over 3 knots (5.6 km/h; 3.5 mph).

== Construction and service ==
Built in Leningrad's Shipyard No. 189 (Ordzhonikidze) as yard number 292, Sokrushitelny was laid down on 29 October 1936, launched on 23 August 1937, and was completed on 13 August 1939. Initially assigned to the Baltic Fleet, she was transferred to the Northern Fleet later that year via the White Sea Canal. This was a lengthy process as the ship had to be lightened to pass through the shallow canal. Her guns, torpedo tubes, masts and propellers all had to be removed and her draft further reduced by the use of pontoons. The destroyer began her voyage on 17 September and did not reach Polyarny on the White Sea until 8 November. During the Winter War, she carried out patrol and convoy escort duty, then conducted training. She was refitting at Molotovsk from 18 July 1940 to 4 July 1941 when the Axis Powers invaded the Soviet Union on 22 June. Now assigned to the 1st Destroyer Division of the fleet, Sokrushitelny, together with her sister ship Grozny and the minelayer Kanin, helped to lay 275 mines on 23–24 July at the entrance to the White Sea. The ship rendezvoused with the British minelayer HMS Adventure on 31 July in the Barents Sea and escorted her to Arkhangelsk. From 10 to 18 August, Sokrushitelny escorted convoys along the coast of Karelia. Together with Grozny, she escorted ships full of evacuees from the Arctic island of Spitzbergen through the White Sea to Arkhangelsk on 23–24 August; a week later, Sokrushitelny, Grozny and the destroyers Valerian Kuybyshev and Uritsky escorted the first supply convoy from Britain to the same destination. On 10–15 September, Sokrushitelny and her sisters in the 1st Destroyer Division (Grozny, Gremyashchy and Gromky) laid a pair of minefields off the Rybachy Peninsula using British mines delivered by Adventure.

Sokrushitelny returned to Polyarny on 1 October and was assigned to the Separate Destroyer Division there. On 24 October, the ship bombarded German positions near the Zapadnaya Litsa River with 114 shells from her 130 mm guns. Five days later, she collided with the minesweeper T-896 in Kola Bay and was under repair for five days. Sokrushitelny bombarded German troops on 6, 9, 16 and 18 November, firing a total of 435 main-gun shells. The ship was assigned to the close escort for Convoy PQ 3 on 23 November. She resumed bombarding German positions between 26 and 30 November, firing 985 shells in four days. Escorted by Sokrushitelny and Grozny, the heavy cruiser HMS Kent sortied on 17 December in an unsuccessful attempt to intercept the German 8th Destroyer Flotilla that had engaged two British minesweepers attempting to rendezvous with Convoy PQ 6. During an escort operation together with Grozny between 24 and 26 December, the destroyer weathered a heavy storm during which a leak forced her to move on one boiler. On 31 December and 1 January 1942, Sokrushitelny fired one hundred 130 mm shells each day at German positions near Motovsky Gulf.

Sokrushitelny and Gremyashchy escorted Convoy PQ 8 into Kola Bay on 20 January and then formed part of the escort for Convoy QP 6 on 24–28 January. On 1 February Sokrushitelny and Grozny sortied to search for German transports in the region surrounding the towns of Vardø and Kirkenes, but the operation was called off due to frost and poor weather conditions. Sokrushitelny was refitted from 20 February to 25 March. The same pair of destroyers were sent to escort Convoy PQ 13 four days later. Later that day the convoy was attacked by three destroyers of the 8th Destroyer Flotilla. Sokrushitelny briefly engaged Z26, claiming at least one hit, which was later sunk by a British destroyer. Sokrushitelny fired twenty main gun shells in the engagement. From 10 to 12 April the sisters escorted the homeward-bound Convoy QP 10 and then the incoming Convoy PQ 14 from 17 to 19 April. They formed the local escort for Convoy QP 11 on 28–30 April. After the light cruiser HMS Edinburgh was torpedoed by a German submarine on 30 April, they reversed course to provide assistance. The destroyers were forced to return to port to refuel on 1 May and put to sea again on the morning of the following day, but returned to base when they received word that Edinburgh had already sunk. On 10 May Sokrushitelny bombarded German positions near the Zapadnaya Litsa River. While engaged in this task she survived a German air attack and her gunners claimed one bomber downed. She escorted Convoy QP 12 on 21–23 May and then helped to escort Convoy PQ 16 on 28–30 May, together with Grozny and Kuybyshev. PQ 16 was attacked on 29 May by German torpedo bombers with all fourteen torpedoes launched by the German aircraft missing their targets and Sokrushitelny's gunners claiming one bomber downed. On the next day they claimed a Junkers Ju 88 bomber destroyed and two more damaged, before the convoy reached Kola Bay on the evening of 30 May.

The ship unsuccessfully searched for ships from Convoy PQ 17 after it had scattered on 8 July together with Gremyashchy. On 10 July Sokrushitelny's steering gear and rangefinders were damaged by fragments from near misses by German bombers. After repairs, she rendezvoused with Allied ships on 23 August carrying supplies for a pair of British torpedo bomber squadrons that were intended to operate in Karelia. In total, from the beginning of the war to 1 September, she made 40 sorties, covering 22,385 nautical miles in 1,518 running hours. On 17–20 September the ship was one of the local escorts for Convoy PQ 18. The following month, Sokrushitelny escorted a freighter from Iokanga to Arkhangelsk on 4–7 November and escorted Convoy QP 15 on 17–20 November. A severe storm struck on the 20th and broke her back, severing her stern and killing 6 men. Valerian Kuybyshev, Uritsky and her sister Razumny were sent to her aid and were able to rescue 191 men, although 29 sailors died during the rescue operations. Low on fuel, the destroyers were forced to depart on 21 November, leaving the ship, which sank after their departure, with a skeleton crew of 16 men. Most of the officers abandoned ship before the crewmen; the captain was shot for cowardice and the executive officer was sent to a penal battalion. Two minesweeping trawlers were named in honor of the senior lieutenants who led the skeleton crew.

During the war, Sokrushitelny fired 1,639 shells from her main guns, of which 84 were directed at aircraft, 855 medium and 2,053 light AA shells, being credited with the destruction of six German aircraft (including two shared with other ships. There were two incidents of accidental torpedo firings, during one of which a sailor was killed. She did not suffer any casualties due to enemy action, while two more sailors drowned in accidents which were the only casualties suffered before her sinking.

== Sources ==
- Balakin, Sergey (2007). Легендарные "семёрки" Эсминцы "сталинской" серии [Legendary Sevens: Stalin's Destroyer Series] (in Russian). Moscow: Yauza/Eksmo. ISBN 978-5-699-23784-5.
- Berezhnoy, Sergey (2002). Крейсера и миноносцы. Справочник [Guide to Cruisers and Destroyers] (in Russian). Moscow: Voenizdat. ISBN 5-203-01780-8.
- Budzbon, Przemysaw (1980). "Soviet Union". In Chesneau, Roger (ed.). Conway's All the World's Fighting Ships 1922–1946. Greenwich, UK: Conway Maritime Press. pp. 318–346. ISBN 0-85177-146-7.
- Budzbon, Przemysław; Radziemski, Jan & Twardowski, Marek (2022). Warships of the Soviet Fleets 1939–1945. Vol. I: Major Combatants. Annapolis, Maryland: Naval Institute Press. ISBN 978-1-68247-877-6.
- Hill, Alexander (2018). Soviet Destroyers of World War II. New Vanguard. Vol. 256. Oxford, UK: Osprey Publishing. ISBN 978-1-4728-2256-7.
- Platonov, Andrey V. (2002). Энциклопедия советских надводных кораблей 1941–1945 [Encyclopedia of Soviet Surface Ships 1941–1945] (in Russian). Saint Petersburg: Poligon. ISBN 5-89173-178-9.
- Rohwer, Jürgen (2005). Chronology of the War at Sea 1939–1945: The Naval History of World War Two (Third Revised ed.). Annapolis, Maryland: Naval Institute Press. ISBN 1-59114-119-2.
- Rohwer, Jürgen & Monakov, Mikhail S. (2001). Stalin's Ocean-Going Fleet. London: Frank Cass. ISBN 0-7146-4895-7.
- Yakubov, Vladimir & Worth, Richard (2008). "The Soviet Project 7/7U Destroyers". In Jordan, John & Dent, Stephen (eds.). Warship 2008. London: Conway. pp. 99–114. ISBN 978-1-84486-062-3.
