= HMS Trinidad (46) =

Fiji-class cruiser

Coordinates: 73°37′N 23°27′E

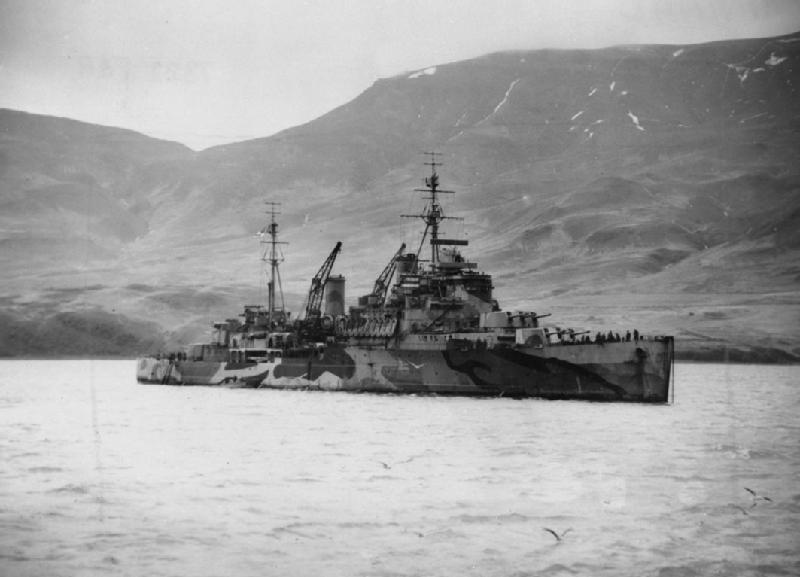
- Trinidad in 1942

History

United Kingdom
- Name: HMS Trinidad
- Namesake: Trinidad
- Builder: HM Dockyard Devonport
- Laid down: 21 April 1938
- Launched: 21 March 1940
- Commissioned: 14 October 1941
- Identification: Pennant number:46
- Fate: Damaged in air attack and scuttled 15 May 1942

General characteristics (as built)
- Class & type: Fiji-class light cruiser
- Displacement: 8,530 long tons (8,670 t) (standard)
- Length: 555 ft 6 in (169.3 m)
- Beam: 62 ft (18.9 m)
- Draught: 19 ft 10 in (6 m)
- Installed power: 4 Admiralty 3-drum boilers; 80,000 shp (60,000 kW)
- Propulsion: 4 shafts; 4 geared steam turbine sets
- Speed: 32.25 knots (59.73 km/h; 37.11 mph)
- Range: 6,250 nmi (11,580 km; 7,190 mi) at 13 knots (24 km/h; 15 mph)
- Complement: 733 (peacetime), 900 (wartime)
- Armament: 4 × triple 6 in (152 mm) guns; 4 × twin 4 in (102 mm) DP guns; 2 × quadruple 2-pdr (40 mm (1.6 in)) AA guns; 4 × quadruple Vickers 0.5 in (12.7 mm) AA machine guns; 2 × triple 21 in (533 mm) torpedo tubes
- Armour: Engine and boiler rooms: 3.25 in (83 mm); Decks: 2–3.5 in (51–89 mm); Magazines: 2–3.5 in (51–89 mm); Gun turrets: 1–2 in (25–51 mm)
- Aircraft carried: 2 × seaplanes
- Aviation facilities: 1 × catapult, 2 × hangars

HMS Trinidad was a Fiji-class cruiser owned by the United Kingdom Royal Navy. She was lost while serving in the Arctic on convoy duty after being damaged escorting the British Arctic convoy PQ 13 in 1942.

== Early career ==
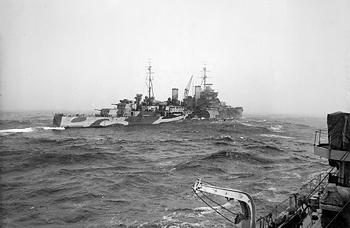
Trinidad as seen from HMS Fury in the North Atlantic during an Arctic convoy escort patrol. Trinidad is dazzle-painted.

Trinidad was built by HM Dockyard Devonport. She was laid down on 21 April 1938, launched 21 March 1941 and commissioned on 14 October 1941. The ship served with the British Home Fleet during her brief career.

== Loss ==
While escorting Convoy PQ 13 in March 1942, she and other escorts came into combat with German Narvik-class destroyers. She hit and damaged the German destroyer Z26 and then launched a torpedo attack. One of her torpedoes had a fault, possibly affected by the icy waters and sub-zero conditions common in the Atlantic en route to Russia; this caused the torpedo to limp through the water at a speed far below the 46 knots expected. The reduced speed caused the torpedo to strike Trinidad, the ship from which it had been launched, as she performed evasive zigzags in its path, killing 32 men. Survivors included Lieutenant Commander Williams as well as composer George Lloyd, a Royal Marines bandsman who had written the ship's official march. The march was performed at the last night of the 2013 BBC Proms on 7 September 2013, in the presence of the last surviving crewman of Trinidad.

Trinidad was towed clear of the action and was then able to proceed under her own power towards Murmansk. The German submarine U-378 attempted to engage and sink the damaged cruiser, but was spotted and attacked by the destroyer Fury. On arrival in Murmansk, Trinidad underwent partial repairs.

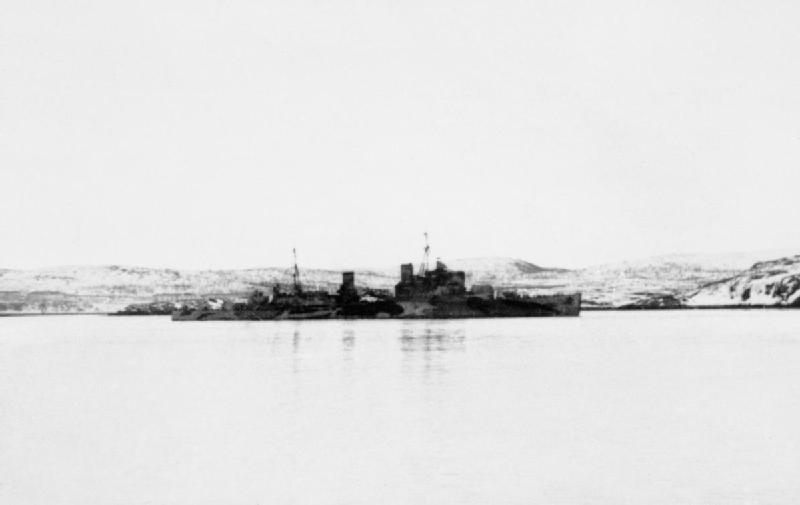
Trinidad under repair in the Kola Inlet at Murmansk

She set out to return home on 13 May 1942, escorted by the destroyers Foresight, Forester, Somali, and Matchless. Other ships of the Home Fleet provided a covering force nearby. Her speed was reduced to 20 knots (37 km/h) owing to the damage she had sustained. En route, she was attacked by more than twenty Ju 88 bombers on 14 May 1942. All attacks missed, except for one bomb that struck near the previous damage, starting a serious fire. Sixty-three men were lost, including twenty survivors from the cruiser Edinburgh, which had been sunk two weeks earlier. The decision was taken to scuttle Trinidad, and on 15 May 1942 she was torpedoed by Matchless and sank in the Arctic Ocean north of North Cape. Four Czechoslovak airmen en route to Great Britain – Sergeant Vratislav Laštovička, Corporals Jan Ferák, Josef Návesník and Bohuslav Zikmund – were killed and three other airmen rescued.

== Bibliography ==
- Campbell, N.J.M. (1980). "Great Britain". In Chesneau, Roger (ed.). Conway's All the World's Fighting Ships 1922–1946. New York: Mayflower Books. pp. 2–85. ISBN 0-8317-0303-2.
- Colledge, J. J.; Wardlow, Ben & Bush, Steve (2020). Ships of the Royal Navy: The Complete Record of All Fighting Ships of the Royal Navy from the 15th Century to the Present (5th ed.). Barnsley, UK: Seaforth Publishing. ISBN 978-1-5267-9327-0.
- Friedman, Norman (2010). British Cruisers: Two World Wars and After. Barnsley, UK: Seaforth Publishing. ISBN 978-1-59114-078-8.
- Raven, Alan & Roberts, John (1980). British Cruisers of World War Two. Annapolis, Maryland: Naval Institute Press. ISBN 0-87021-922-7.
- Rohwer, Jürgen (2005). Chronology of the War at Sea 1939–1945: The Naval History of World War Two (Third Revised ed.). Annapolis, Maryland: Naval Institute Press. ISBN 1-59114-119-2.
- Whitley, M. J. (1995). Cruisers of World War Two: An International Encyclopedia. London: Cassell. ISBN 1-86019-874-0.
