= German destroyer Z26 =

Destroyer

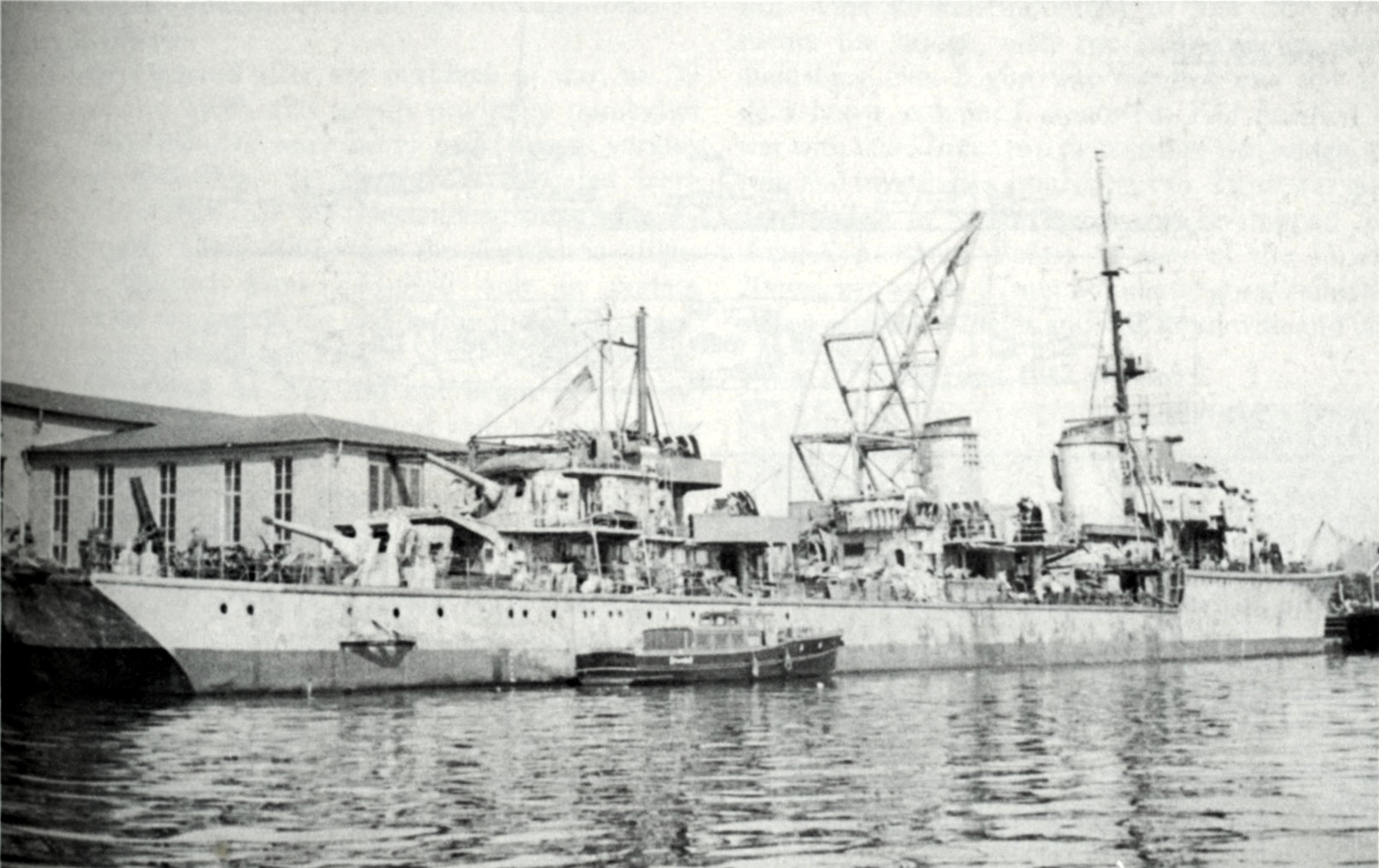
- Sister ship Z29, 1945

History

Nazi Germany
- Name: Z26
- Ordered: 23 April 1938
- Builder: AG Weser (Deschimag), Bremen
- Yard number: W960
- Laid down: 1 April 1939
- Launched: 2 April 1940
- Completed: 11 January 1941
- Fate: Sunk, 29 March 1942

General characteristics (as built)
- Class & type: Type 1936A destroyer
- Displacement: 2,543 long tons (2,584 t) (standard); 3,543 long tons (3,600 t) (deep load)
- Length: 127 m (416 ft 8 in) (o/a)
- Beam: 12 m (39 ft 4 in)
- Draft: 4.43 m (14 ft 6 in)
- Installed power: 6 × water-tube boilers; 70,000 PS (51,000 kW; 69,000 shp)
- Propulsion: 2 × shafts; 2 × geared steam turbine sets
- Speed: 36 knots (67 km/h; 41 mph)
- Range: 2,500 nmi (4,600 km; 2,900 mi) at 19 knots (35 km/h; 22 mph)
- Complement: 332
- Armament: 4 × single 15 cm (5.9 in) guns; 2 × twin 3.7 cm (1.5 in) anti-aircraft guns; 5 × single 2 cm (0.8 in) AA guns; 2 × quadruple 53.3 cm (21 in) torpedo tubes; 4 × depth charge launchers; 60 mines

Z26 was one of fifteen Type 1936A destroyers built for the Kriegsmarine (German Navy) during World War II. Completed in early 1941, the ship spent her active career in Norwegian waters. She first arrived there in November, but was plagued with engine problems and had to return to Germany for repairs in January 1942. Z26 returned to Norway two months later and became flagship of a destroyer flotilla. Together with two of her sisters, she attempted to intercept Convoy PQ 13. They rescued survivors from an already sunken ship before Z26 sank one straggler from the convoy. The three destroyers were spotted by a British light cruiser that badly damaged Z26 before one of the cruiser's torpedoes circled back around and crippled her. Pursuit of Z26 was taken over by a British destroyer that so badly damaged her that she was drifting and on fire when the timely arrival of the other two German destroyers prevented the British ship from sinking Z26. They were able to rescue 88 survivors and a submarine later rescued 8 others; 243 crewmen were killed in the battle.

== Design and description ==
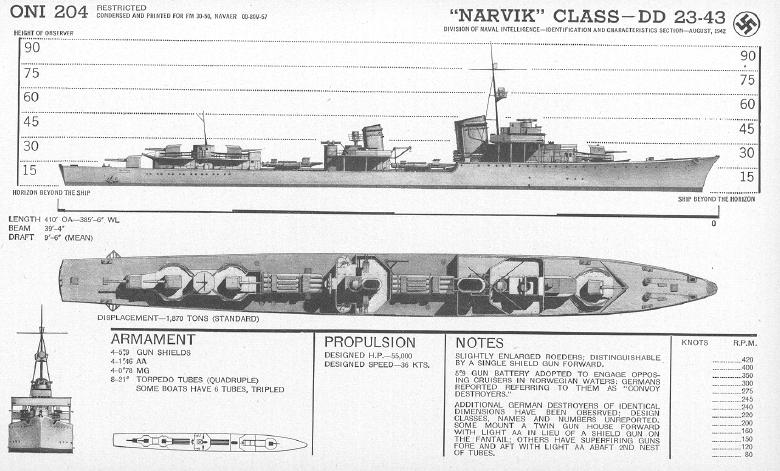
Wartime Allied recognition manual drawing of the Type 36A destroyer

The Type 1936A destroyers were slightly larger than the preceding Type 1936 class and had a heavier armament. They had an overall length of 127 meters (416 ft 8 in) and were 121.90 meters (399 ft 11 in) long at the waterline. The ships had a beam of 12 meters (39 ft 4 in), and a maximum draft of 4.62 meters (15 ft 2 in). They displaced 2,543 long tons (2,584 t) at standard load and 3,543 long tons (3,600 t) at deep load. The two Wagner geared steam turbine sets, each driving one propeller shaft, were designed to produce 70,000 PS (51,000 kW; 69,000 shp) using steam provided by six Wagner water-tube boilers for a designed speed of 36 knots (67 km/h; 41 mph). Z26 carried a maximum of 791 metric tons (779 long tons) of fuel oil which gave a range of 2,500 nautical miles (4,600 km; 2,900 mi) at 19 knots (35 km/h; 22 mph). Her crew consisted of 11 officers and 321 sailors.

The ship carried four 15-centimeter (5.9 in) TbtsK C/36 guns in single mounts with gun shields, one forward of the superstructure and three aft. Her anti-aircraft armament consisted of four 3.7-centimeter (1.5 in) C/30 guns in two twin mounts abreast the rear funnel and five 2-centimeter (0.8 in) C/30 guns in single mounts. Z26 carried eight above-water 53.3-centimeter (21 in) torpedo tubes in two power-operated mounts. Two reloads were provided for each mount. She had four depth charge launchers and mine rails could be fitted on the rear deck that had a maximum capacity of 60 mines. 'GHG' (Gruppenhorchgerät) passive hydrophones were fitted to detect submarines and an S-Gerät sonar was also probably fitted. The ship was equipped with a FuMO 24/25 radar set above the bridge.

== Construction and career ==
Z26 was ordered from AG Weser (Deschimag) on 23 April 1938. The ship was laid down at Deschimag's Bremen shipyard as yard number W960 on 1 April 1939, launched on 2 April 1940, and commissioned on 9 January 1941. She was assigned to escort the Baltic Fleet, a temporary formation built around the battleship Tirpitz, as it sortied into the Sea of Åland on 23–29 September to forestall any attempt by the Soviet Red Banner Baltic Fleet to break out from the Gulf of Finland.

On 9 November, Z26 and her sister ship Z24 sailed for northern Norway; at Tromsø her lubrication pump for her starboard low-pressure turbine broke down, destroying the rotor blades. With her repairs completed by 14 December, she joined her sisters of the 8. Zerstörerflottile (8th Destroyer Flotilla) at Kirkenes, although another lubrication pump broke down and she could not participate in the planned sortie off the Murmansk coast. Still plagued by machinery troubles, Z26 departed for Germany on 5 January 1942 for a refit. Refit completed, she escorted the heavy cruiser Admiral Hipper from Brunsbüttel, Germany, to Trondheim, Norway, on 18 March and then accompanied the heavy cruiser Admiral Scheer from Trondheim to Narvik, reaching Kirkenes on the 27th.

On 28 March, Z26, now the flagship of Kapitän zur See Gottfried Pönitz, commander of the 8. Flotille, departed the Varangerfjord in an attempt to intercept Convoy PQ 13 together with her sisters Z24 and Z25. Later that night they rescued 61 survivors of the sunken freighter SS Empire Ranger then sank the straggling 4,687-gross register ton (GRT) freighter SS Bateau. Z26 attacked her with gunfire, then finished her off with a torpedo. The Germans rescued 7 survivors before resuming the search for the convoy. The light cruiser HMS Trinidad, escorted by the destroyer HMS Fury, spotted the German ships with her radar at 08:49 on the 29th and was spotted herself around that same time. Both sides opened fire at the point-blank range of 3,200 yards (2,900 m) in a snowstorm. Trinidad engaged the leading German destroyer, Z26, and hit her with her second salvo from her forward guns. Her shells knocked out two 15 cm guns, damaged the port turbine room and started a large fire. Between them the destroyers fired 19 torpedoes at the cruiser, all of which missed after Trinidad turned away, and hit her twice with their 15 cm guns, inflicting only minor damage. Both sides maneuvered to avoid torpedoes, which forced them to disengage, and accidentally separated Z26 from her sisters. Trinidad's radar found the damaged destroyer and the cruiser altered course and increased speed to intercept. She opened fire at 09:17 at a range of 2,900 yards (2,700 m) at the wildly maneuvering Z26, scoring only three hits from 37 main-gun salvoes. Trying to finish off the badly damaged destroyer, Trinidad fired a single torpedo five minutes later; two other torpedoes failed to leave their tubes due to icing. The one torpedo circled back around and struck Trinidad, crippling the cruiser. The German destroyer attempted to disengage, but Fury, which had not yet fired during the battle, set off in pursuit.

Z26 passed by three destroyers of the convoy's escort, but only the two Soviet ships, Sokrushitel'nyy and Gremyashchiy, fired at her through the snow; HMS Eclipse thought the German ship was Trinidad. Fury fired two salvoes without effect at Eclipse at 09:30 before recognizing her as friendly and turned back to render assistance to Trinidad. Eclipse then took up the pursuit and her radar spotted Z26 at a range of about 2 nautical miles (3.7 km; 2.3 mi). She opened fire when the range decreased to 800 yards (730 m). The German ship attempted to disengage under the cover of a smoke screen, but was unsuccessful as Eclipse continued to hit her. After the sixth hit, Z26 lost power at 10:20 and was listing to port with her stern awash. The British destroyer was maneuvering to give the German destroyer the coup de grâce with her last torpedo when the snowstorm ended and visibility increased, revealing Z24 and Z25 approaching. They promptly opened fire at Eclipse, hitting her twice and wounding nine men, before she could find cover in a squall at 10:35. The German ships did not pursue Eclipse, preferring to heave-to and take off 88 survivors. The German submarine U-376 later picked up another 8, although 243 crewmen were killed.
