= German submarine U-585 =

German World War II submarine

History

Nazi Germany
- Name: U-585
- Ordered: 8 January 1940
- Builder: Blohm & Voss, Hamburg
- Yard number: 561
- Laid down: 1 October 1940
- Launched: 9 July 1941
- Commissioned: 28 August 1941
- Fate: Sunk on 30 March 1942 by a German mine

General characteristics
- Class & type: Type VIIC submarine
- Displacement: 769 tonnes (757 long tons) surfaced; 871 t (857 long tons) submerged
- Length: 67.10 m (220 ft 2 in) o/a; 50.50 m (165 ft 8 in) pressure hull
- Beam: 6.20 m (20 ft 4 in) o/a; 4.70 m (15 ft 5 in) pressure hull
- Height: 9.60 m (31 ft 6 in)
- Draught: 4.74 m (15 ft 7 in)
- Installed power: 2,800–3,200 PS (2,100–2,400 kW; 2,800–3,200 bhp) (diesels); 750 PS (550 kW; 740 shp) (electric)
- Propulsion: 2 shafts; 2 × diesel engines; 2 × electric motors
- Speed: 17.7 knots (32.8 km/h; 20.4 mph) surfaced; 7.6 knots (14.1 km/h; 8.7 mph) submerged
- Range: 8,500 nmi (15,700 km; 9,800 mi) at 10 knots (19 km/h; 12 mph) surfaced; 80 nmi (150 km; 92 mi) at 4 knots (7.4 km/h; 4.6 mph) submerged
- Test depth: 230 m (750 ft); Crush depth: 250–295 m (820–968 ft)
- Complement: 4 officers, 40–56 enlisted
- Armament: 5 × 53.3 cm (21 in) torpedo tubes (four bow, one stern); 14 × torpedoes or 26 TMA mines; 1 × 8.8 cm (3.46 in) deck gun (220 rounds); 1 x 2 cm (0.79 in) C/30 AA gun

Service record
- Part of: 6th U-boat Flotilla; 28 August 1941 – 30 March 1942
- Identification codes: M 05 506
- Commanders: Kptlt. Ernst-Bernward Lohse; 28 August 1941 – 30 March 1942
- Operations: 4 patrols: 1st patrol: 15 – 21 January 1942; 2nd patrol: 25 January – 21 February 1942; 3rd patrol: 15 – 25 March 1942; 4th patrol: 28 – 30 March 1942
- Victories: None

German submarine U-585 was a Type VIIC U-boat of Nazi Germany's Kriegsmarine during World War II.

She carried out four patrols, but sank no ships. She was a member of one wolfpack.

The boat was sunk by a drifting German mine in the Barents Sea on 30 March 1942.

== Design ==
German Type VIIC submarines were preceded by the shorter Type VIIB submarines. U-585 had a displacement of 769 tonnes (757 long tons) when at the surface and 871 tonnes (857 long tons) while submerged. She had a total length of 67.10 m (220 ft 2 in), a pressure hull length of 50.50 m (165 ft 8 in), a beam of 6.20 m (20 ft 4 in), a height of 9.60 m (31 ft 6 in), and a draught of 4.74 m (15 ft 7 in). The submarine was powered by two Germaniawerft F46 four-stroke, six-cylinder supercharged diesel engines producing a total of 2,800 to 3,200 metric horsepower (2,060 to 2,350 kW; 2,760 to 3,160 shp) for use while surfaced, two Brown, Boveri & Cie GG UB 720/8 double-acting electric motors producing a total of 750 metric horsepower (550 kW; 740 shp) for use while submerged. She had two shafts and two 1.23 m (4 ft) propellers. The boat was capable of operating at depths of up to 230 metres (750 ft).

The submarine had a maximum surface speed of 17.7 knots (32.8 km/h; 20.4 mph) and a maximum submerged speed of 7.6 knots (14.1 km/h; 8.7 mph). When submerged, the boat could operate for 80 nautical miles (150 km; 92 mi) at 4 knots (7.4 km/h; 4.6 mph); when surfaced, she could travel 8,500 nautical miles (15,700 km; 9,800 mi) at 10 knots (19 km/h; 12 mph). U-585 was fitted with five 53.3 cm (21 in) torpedo tubes (four fitted at the bow and one at the stern), fourteen torpedoes, one 8.8 cm (3.46 in) SK C/35 naval gun, 220 rounds, and a 2 cm (0.79 in) C/30 anti-aircraft gun. The boat had a complement of between forty-four and sixty.

== Service history ==
The submarine was laid down on 1 October 1940 at Blohm & Voss, Hamburg as yard number 561, launched on 9 July 1941 and commissioned on 28 August under the command of Kapitänleutnant Ernst-Bernward Lohse.

She served with the 6th U-boat Flotilla from 28 August 1941 for training and stayed with that organization for operations until her loss, from 1 December 1941 until 30 March 1942.

=== First patrol ===
U-585's first patrol was preceded by a trip to Trondheim then Neidenfjord [west northwest of Murmansk], both in Norway over Christmas and New Year's Eve 1941–42. The patrol itself started in Neidenfjord on 15 January 1942 and finished in Kirkenes on the 21st.

=== Second patrol ===
Her second foray was notable for the loss overboard of Fahnrich zur See [midshipman] Eberhard Vollmer on 5 February 1942 in the southern Barents Sea.

=== Third patrol ===
The boat was attacked with depth charges by three enemy ships northeast of Kirkenes on 24 March 1942. The damage to the forward torpedo tubes was serious enough to require the submarine to return to her base.

=== Fourth patrol and loss ===
While in Varanfjord, the Soviet submarine M-171 fired both of her torpedoes at an unknown, but outbound U-boat. This can only have been U-585, although she did not report any attack.

She was sunk on 30 March 1942 by a German mine that had drifted from the 'Bantos-A' barrage.

Forty-four men died with U-585; there were no survivors.

== Previously recorded fate ==
U-585 was sunk on 29 March 1942 by the British destroyer HMS Fury. It was later ascertained that this attack was against U-378 and caused no damage.

The boat was also claimed to be sunk by the Soviet destroyer Gremyashiy on 30 March 1942. This attack was against U-435 and was also inconclusive.

== Bibliography ==
- Busch, Rainer; Röll, Hans-Joachim (1999). German U-boat commanders of World War II : a biographical dictionary. Translated by Brooks, Geoffrey. London, Annapolis, Md: Greenhill Books, Naval Institute Press. ISBN 1-55750-186-6.
- Busch, Rainer; Röll, Hans-Joachim (1999). Der U-Boot-Krieg, 1939-1945: Deutsche U-Boot-Verluste von September 1939 bis Mai 1945 [German U-boat losses from September 1939 to May 1945] (in German). Vol. IV. Hamburg, Berlin, Bonn: Mittler. ISBN 3-8132-0514-2.
- Gröner, Eric; Jung, Dieter; Maass, Martin (1991). German Warships 1815-1945: U-boats and Mine Warfare Vessels. Vol. 2. Translated by Thomas, Keith; Magowan, Rachel. London: Conway Maritime Press. ISBN 0-85177-593-4.
- Kemp, Paul (1997). U-Boats Destroyed – German Submarine Losses in the World Wars. Arms & Armour. ISBN 1-85409-515-3.
