= Convoy PQ 14 =

WWII Arctic Convoy

- Part of Arctic naval operations of the Second World War
- German occupied Norway (in green) along the flank of the sea route to northern Russia
Date	8–19 April 1942
Location	Arctic Ocean
Result	Allied victory

Belligerents
Allies	Germany

Commanders and leaders
Stuart Bonham Carter	Hans-Jürgen Stumpff

Units involved
Convoy QP 14 and Allied escorts	Luftflotte 5

Strength
26 merchant ships; escorts in relay	2 U-boats; 3 destroyers; Junkers Ju 88 bombers

Casualties and losses
1 ship sunk; 16 ships turned back with ice damage	1 Junkers Ju 88

Convoy PQ 14 was an Arctic convoy sent from Britain by the Western Allies to aid the Soviet Union during the Second World War. Convoys from Britain had been despatched since August 1941 and advantage had been taken of the perpetual darkness of the Arctic winter. German operations against the convoys had been muted due to the need to support Operation Barbarossa, confidence in imminent victory and the small size of the convoys. In late 1941 and early 1942 the Luftwaffe and Kriegsmarine had reinforced Norway with aircraft and ships.

The convoy sailed in April 1942, when the hours of daylight were increasing and the Polar ice had yet to recede. On the night of 10/11 April, thirty hours' sailing in fog and pack ice caused so much damage that 16 vessels had to turn back and return to Iceland. On 16 April, air and U-boat attacks sank one merchant ship and the seven remaining ships in the convoy reached Murmansk. The Allies would have to run larger convoys during the hazardous summer months to catch up with deliveries.

The co-ordination of German aircraft and submarine attacks caused the Navy concern as daylight hours increased towards the perpetual daylight of the midnight sun. Despite the recent reinforcement of convoy escorts, the last four days of the voyage would be under continuous observation and submarine attacks would increase just as the escorts were inhibited by shortage of fuel; the Navy predicted serious losses.

== Background ==
=== Lend-lease ===
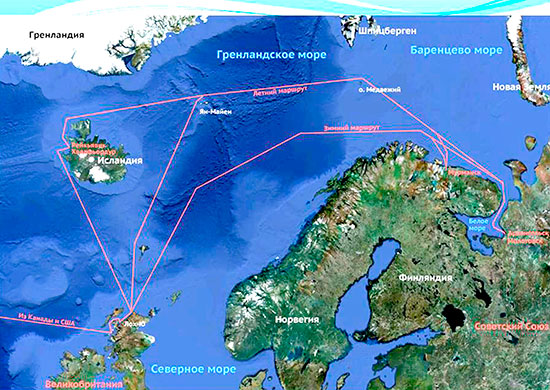
Russian map showing Arctic convoy routes from Britain and Iceland, past Norway to the Barents Sea and northern Russian ports

After Operation Barbarossa, the German invasion of the USSR, began on 22 June 1941, Britain and USSR signed an agreement in July that they would "render each other assistance and support of all kinds in the present war against Hitlerite Germany". Before September 1941 the British had dispatched 450 aircraft, 22,000 long tons (22,000 t) of rubber, 3,000,000 pairs of boots and stocks of tin, aluminium, jute, lead and wool. In September British and US representatives travelled to Moscow to study Soviet requirements and their ability to meet them. The representatives of the three countries drew up a protocol in October 1941 to last until June 1942 and to agree new protocols to operate from 1 July to 30 June of each following year until the end of Lend-Lease. The protocol listed supplies, monthly rates of delivery and totals for the period.

The first protocol specified the supplies to be sent but not the ships to move them. The USSR turned out to lack the ships and escorts and the British and Americans, who had made a commitment to "help with the delivery", undertook to deliver the supplies for want of an alternative. The main Soviet need in 1941 was military equipment to replace losses because, at the time of the negotiations, two large aircraft factories were being moved east from Leningrad and two more from Ukraine. It would take at least eight months to resume production, until when, aircraft output would fall from 80 to 30 aircraft per day. Britain and the US undertook to send 400 aircraft a month, at a ratio of three bombers to one fighter (later reversed), 500 tanks a month and 300 Bren gun carriers. The Anglo-Americans also undertook to send 42,000 long tons (43,000 t) of aluminium and 3, 862 machine tools, along with sundry raw materials, food and medical supplies.

=== British grand strategy ===
The growing German air strength in Norway and increasing losses to convoys and their escorts, led Rear-Admiral Stuart Bonham Carter, commander of the 18th Cruiser Squadron, Admiral sir John Tovey, Commander in Chief Home Fleet and Admiral Sir Dudley Pound the First Sea Lord, the professional head of the Royal Navy, unanimously to advocate the suspension of Arctic convoys during the summer months. The small number of Russian ships available to meet Arctic convoys, losses inflicted by Luftflotte 5 based in Norway and the presence of the German battleship Tirpitz in Norway from early 1942, had led to a large number of ships full of supplies to Russia becoming stranded at the west end and empty and damaged ships waiting at the east end.

Despite the views of the Navy, Churchill came under pressure from the president of the United States, Franklin D. Roosevelt and the Soviet leader, Joseph Stalin, bowed to political reality and ordered the dispatch of a larger convoy to reduce the backlog,

The operation is justified if half gets through. Failure on our part to make the attempt would weaken our influence with both our major allies.

— Winston Churchill

Convoy PQ 13 had been the first convoy to suffer serious casualties, five ships being sunk by submarines, aircraft and surface ships. Tovey asked the Russians for more submarine patrols in the Barents Sea and more destroyer escorts for the final leg of the convoys. More escorts were diverted from Western Approaches Command to increase the close escort to about ten vessels. Bomber Command had sent 33 Halifax heavy bombers to attack Tirpitz on 31 March in exceedingly poor weather, through which few aircraft managed to bomb. No hits were obtained and five of the Halifaxes were shot down. Convoy PQ 14 was considerably larger than earlier convoys.

=== Signals intelligence ===
==== Ultra ====
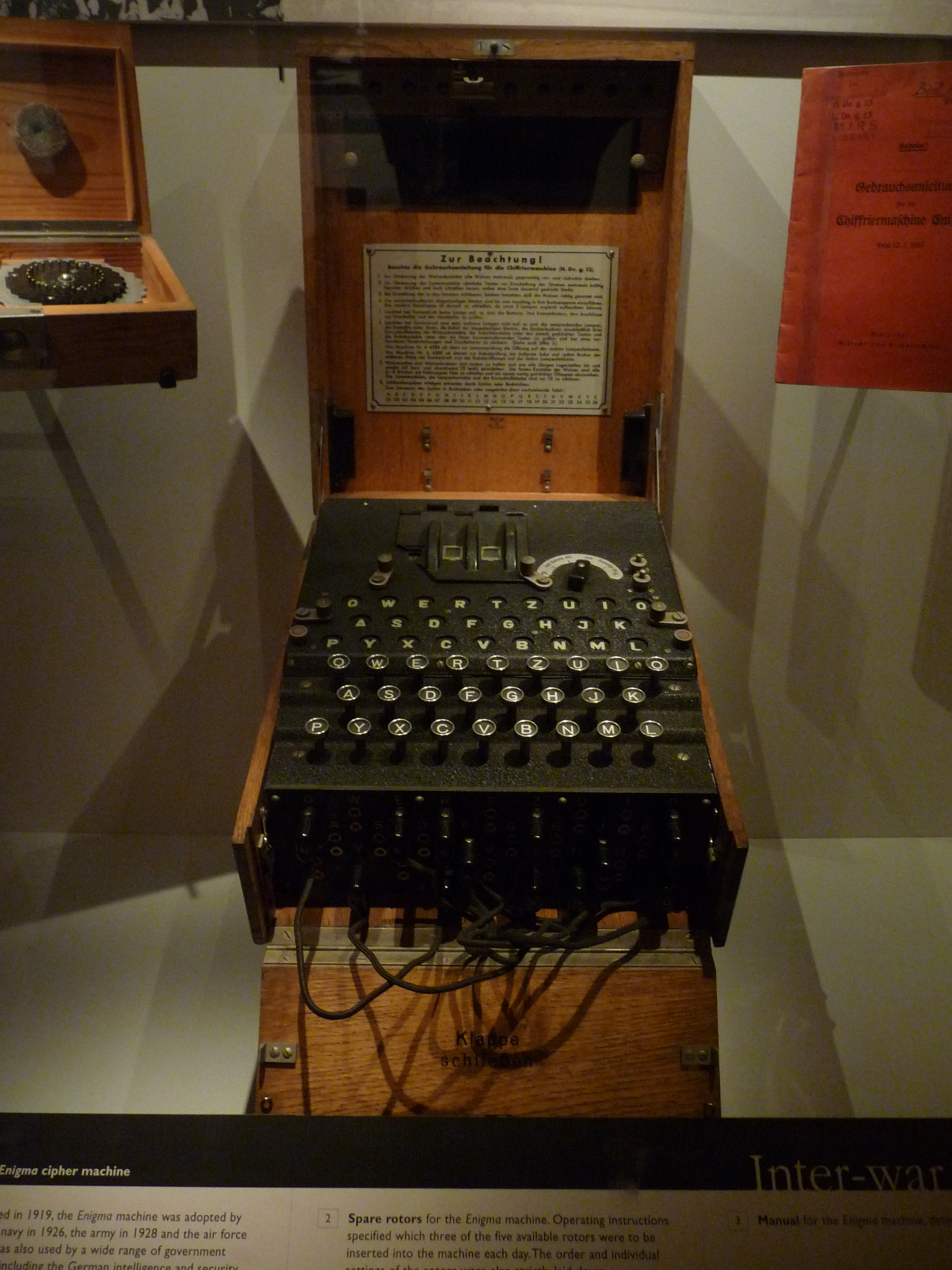
Photograph of a German Enigma coding machine

The British Government Code and Cypher School (GC&CS) based at Bletchley Park housed a small industry of code-breakers and traffic analysts that intercepted and decoded German naval transmissions. By June 1941, the German Enigma machine Home Waters (Heimish) settings used by surface ships and U-boats could quickly be read. On 1 February 1942, the Enigma machines used in U-boats in the Atlantic and Mediterranean were changed but German ships and the U-boats in Arctic waters continued with the older Heimish (Hydra from 1942, code-named Dolphin by the British). By mid-1941, British Y-stations were able to read Luftwaffe wireless telegraphy (W/T) transmissions and give advance warning of Luftwaffe operations. In 1941, interception parties (code-named Headaches) embarked on warships. Enigma decrypts were used twice to tell Convoy PQ 14 that the big German ships had not sailed.

==== B-Dienst ====
The rival German Beobachtungsdienst (B-Dienst, Observation Service) of the Kriegsmarine Marinenachrichtendienst (MND, Naval Intelligence Service) had broken several Admiralty codes and cyphers by 1939, which were used to help Kriegsmarine ships elude British forces and provide opportunities for surprise attacks. From June to August 1940, six British submarines were sunk in the Skaggerak using information gleaned from British wireless signals. In 1941, B-Dienst read signals from the Commander in Chief Western Approaches informing convoys of areas patrolled by U-boats, enabling the submarines to move into "safe" zones. B-Dienst had broken Naval Cypher No 3 in February 1942 and by March was reading up to 80 per cent of the traffic, which continued until 15 December 1943. By coincidence, the British lost access to the Shark cypher and had no information to send in Cypher No 3 which might compromise Ultra.

=== Luftflotte 5 ===
In March 1942, Adolf Hitler issued a directive for a greater anti-convoy effort to weaken the Red Army and prevent Allied troops being transferred to northern Russia, preparatory to a landing on the coast of northern Norway. Luftflotte 5 (Generaloberst Hans-Jürgen Stumpff) was to be reinforced and the Kriegsmarine was ordered to put an end to Arctic convoys and naval incursions. The Luftwaffe and Kriegsmarine were to work together with a simplified command structure, which was implemented after a conference; the Navy had preferred joint command but the Luftwaffe insisted on the exchange of liaison officers. Luftflotte 5 was to be reinforced by 2./Kampfgeschwader 30 (KG 30) which was to increase its readiness for operations. A squadron of Aufklärungsflieger Gruppe 125 (Aufkl.Fl.Gr. 125) was transferred to Norway and more long-range Focke-Wulf Fw 200 Kondor patrol aircraft from Kampfgeschwader 40 (KG 40) were sent from France. At the end of March, the air fleet was divided. Fliegerführer Nord (Ost) [Oberst Alexander Holle], the largest command, was based at Kirkenes with 2./JG 5, 10.(Z)/JG 5, 1./StG 5 (Dive Bomber Wing 5) and 1.Fernaufklärungsgruppe 124 [1./(F) 124] (1 Squadron, Long Range Reconnaissance Wing 124) charged with attacks on Murmansk and Archangelsk as well as attacks on convoys.

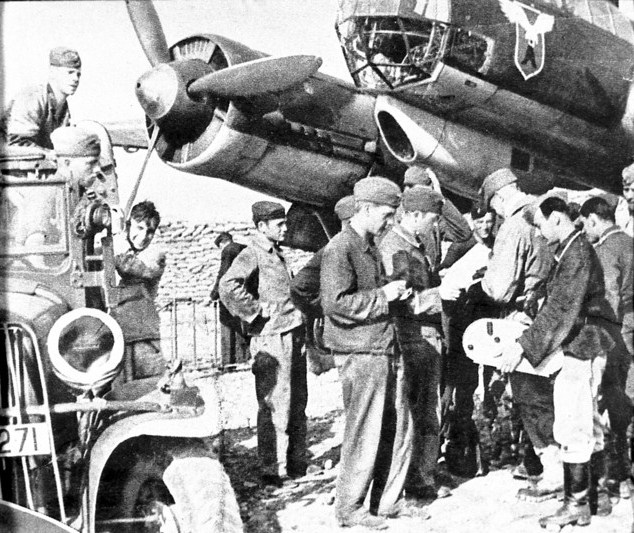
Junkers Ju 88 D-2 of 1. Staffel der Fernaufklärungsgruppe 124 (1.(F)/124, 1st Squadron of Long-Range Reconnaissance Wing 124), presumably in Kirkenes/Northern Norway, 1942. A film cassette is handed over to the photo development and evaluation centre.

Part of Fliegerführer Nord (Ost) was based at Petsamo (5./JG 5, 6./JG 5 and 3./Kampfgeschwader 26 (3./KG 26), Banak (2./KG 30, 3./KG 30 and 1./(F) 22) and Billefjord (1./Kü.Fl.Gr. 125). Fliegerführer Lofoten (Oberst Hans Roth) was based at Bardufoss but had no permanently attached units, which were added according to events. At the start of the anti-shipping campaign only the coastal patrol squadrons 3./Küstenfliegergruppe 906 at Trondheim and 1./1./Kü.Fl.Gr. 123 at Tromsø were attached to Fliegerführer Lofoten. Fliegerführer Nord (West) was based at Sola and was responsible for the early detection of convoys and attacks south of a line from Trondheim westwards to Shetland and Iceland, with 1./(F) 22, the Kondors of 1./KG 40, short-range coastal reconnaissance squadrons 1./Küstenfliegergruppe 406 (1./Kü.Fl.Gr. 406), 2./ Küstenfliegergruppe 406 (2./Kü.Fl.Gr. 406) and a weather reconnaissance squadron.

=== Luftwaffe tactics ===
As soon as information was received about the assembly of a convoy, Fliegerführer Nord (West) would send long-range reconnaissance aircraft to search Iceland and northern Scotland. Once a convoy was spotted aircraft were to keep contact as far as possible in the extreme weather of the area. If contact was lost its course at the last sighting would be extrapolated and overlapping sorties would be flown to regain contact. All three Fliegerführer were to co-operate as the convoy moved through their operational areas. Fliegerführer Lofoten would begin the anti-convoy operation east to a line from the North Cape to Spitzbergen Island, whence Fliegerführer Nord (Ost) would take over using his and Fliegerführer Lofoten's aircraft, which would to Kirkenes or Petsamo to stay in range. Fliegerführer Nord (Ost) was not allowed to divert aircraft to ground support during the operation. As soon as the convoy came into range, the aircraft were to keep up a continuous attack until the convoy docked at Murmansk or Archangelsk.

From late March to late May the air effort against convoys PQ 13, 14, 15 and convoys QP 9, 10 and 11 had little effect, twelve sinkings out of 16 lost in PQ convoys and two out of five sinkings from QP convoys being credited to the Luftwaffe; 166 merchant ships had sailed for Russia and 145 had survived the journey. Bad weather had been nearly as dangerous as the Luftwaffe but in April, the spring thaw grounded many Luftwaffe aircraft and in May bad weather led to contact being lost and convoys scattering, being impossible to find in the long Arctic night. When air attacks on convoys had taken place, the formations rarely amounted to more than twelve aircraft, greatly simplifying the task of convoy anti-aircraft gunners, who shot down several aircraft in April and May. Failings in liaison between the Luftwaffe and Kriegsmarine were uncovered and tactical co-operation greatly enhanced, Hermann Böhm (Kommandierender Admiral Norwegen) noting that in the operation against Convoy PQ 15 and Convoy QP 11, there were no problems in co-operation between aircraft, submarines and destroyers. From 152 aircraft in January, reinforcements to Luftflotte 5 increased its strength to 221 front-line aircraft by March 1942. (Note: By May Luftflotte 5 had 264 aircraft based around the North Cape in northern Norway, consisting of 108 Junkers JU 88 long-range bombers, 42 Heinkel He 111 torpedo-bombers, 15 Heinkel He 115 float-plane torpedo-bombers, 30 Junkers Ju 87 dive-bombers and 74 long range Focke Wulf 200s, Junkers 88s and Blohm & Voss BV 138s.)

==== Air-sea rescue ====
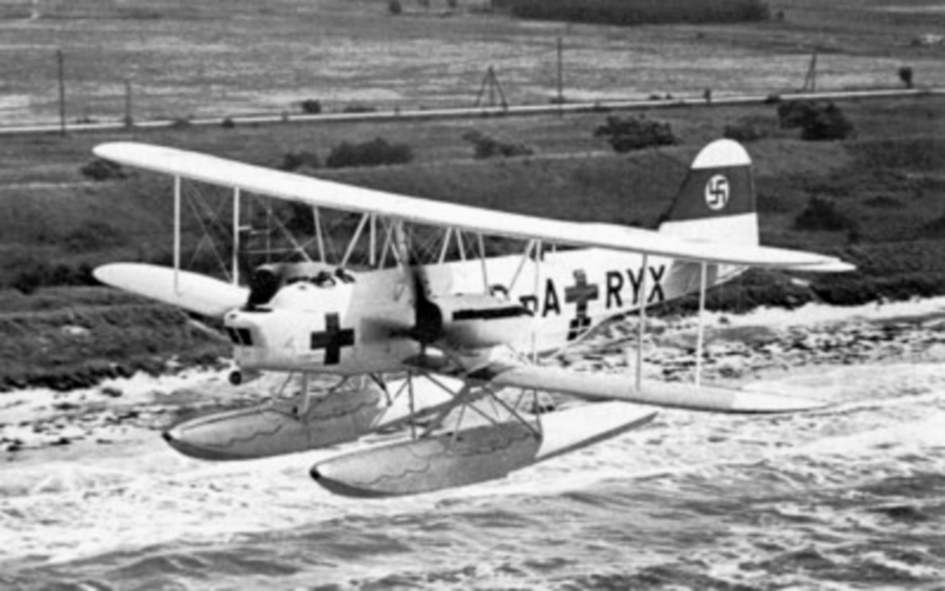
Example of a Heinkel He 59 search and rescue aircraft (1940)

The Luftwaffe Sea Rescue Service (Seenotdienst) along with the Kriegsmarine, the Norwegian Society for Sea Rescue (RS) and ships on passage, recovered aircrew and shipwrecked sailors. The service comprised Seenotbereich VIII at Stavanger covering Stavanger, Bergen and Trondheim and Seenotbereich IX at Kirkenes for Tromsø, Billefjord and Kirkenes. Co-operation was as important in rescues as it was in anti-shipping operations if people were to be saved before they succumbed to the climate and severe weather. The sea rescue aircraft comprised Heinkel He 59 floatplanes, Dornier Do 18 and Dornier Do 24 seaplanes.

Oberkommando der Luftwaffe (OKL, the high command of the Luftwaffe) was not able to increase the number of search and rescue aircraft in Norway, due to a general shortage of aircraft and crews, despite Stumpff pointing out that coming down in such cold waters required extremely swift recovery and that his crews "must be given a chance of rescue" or morale could not be maintained. After the experience of PQ 16, Stumpff gave the task to the coastal reconnaissance squadrons, whose aircraft were not usually engaged in attacks on convoys. They would henceforth stand by to rescue aircrew during anti-shipping operations.

== Prelude ==
=== Arctic Ocean ===
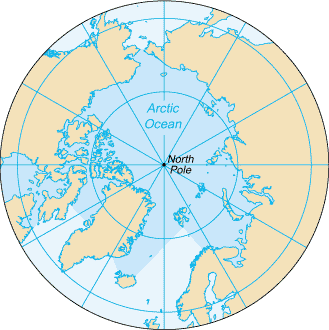
Diagram of the Arctic Ocean

Between Greenland and Norway are some of the most stormy waters of the world's oceans, 890 mi (1,440 km) of water under gales full of snow, sleet and hail. Around the North Cape and the Barents Sea the sea temperature rarely rises above 4° Celsius and a man in the water would probably die unless rescued immediately. The cold water and air made spray freeze on the superstructure of ships, which had to be removed quickly to avoid the ship becoming top-heavy. The cold Arctic water was met by the Gulf Stream, warm water from the Gulf of Mexico, which became the North Atlantic Drift, arriving at the south-west of England the drift moves between Scotland and Iceland. North of Norway the drift splits.

A northern stream goes north of Bear Island to Svalbard and the southern stream following the coast of Murmansk into the Barents Sea. The mingling of cold Arctic water and warmer water of higher salinity generates thick banks of fog for convoys to hide in. The waters drastically reduced the effectiveness of ASDIC as U-boats moved in waters of differing temperatures and density. In winter, polar ice can form as far south as 50 mi (80 km) of the North Cape and in summer it can recede to Svalbard, forcing ships closer to Luftwaffe air bases or being able to sail further out to sea. The area is in perpetual darkness in winter and permanent daylight in the summer which makes air reconnaissance almost impossible or easy.

=== Arctic convoys ===
In October 1941, the Prime Minister, Winston Churchill, made a commitment to send a convoy to the Arctic ports of the USSR every ten days and to deliver 1,200 tanks a month from July 1942 to January 1943, followed by 2,000 tanks and another 3,600 aircraft in excess of those already promised. (Note: In October 1941, the unloading capacity of Archangel was 300,000 long tons (300,000 t), Vladivostok (Pacific Route) 140,000 long tons (140,000 t) and 60,000 long tons (61,000 t) in the Persian Gulf (for the Persian Corridor route) ports.) The first convoy was due at Murmansk around 12 October and the next convoy was to depart Iceland on 22 October. A motley of British, Allied and neutral shipping loaded with military stores and raw materials for the Soviet war effort would be assembled at Hvalfjörður in Iceland, convenient for ships from both sides of the Atlantic. By late 1941, the convoy system used in the Atlantic had been established on the Arctic run; a convoy commodore ensured that the ships' masters and signals officers attended a briefing to make arrangements for the management of the convoy, which sailed in a formation of long rows of short columns. The commodore was usually a retired naval officer or a Royal Naval Reserveist and would be aboard one of the merchant ships (identified by a white pendant with a blue cross). The commodore was assisted by a Naval signals party of four men, who used lamps, semaphore flags and telescopes to pass signals in code.

In large convoys, the commodore was assisted by vice- and rear-commodores with whom he directed the speed, course and zig-zagging of the merchant ships and liaised with the escort commander. (Note: The codebooks were carried in a weighted bag which was to be dumped overboard to prevent capture.) By the end of 1941, 187 Matilda II and 249 Valentine tanks had been delivered, comprising 25 per cent of the medium-heavy tanks in the Red Army and 30 to 40 per cent of the medium-heavy tanks defending Moscow. In December 1941, 16 per cent of the fighters defending Moscow were Hawker Hurricanes and Curtiss Tomahawks from Britain; by 1 January 1942, 96 Hurricane fighters were flying in the Soviet Air Forces (Voyenno-Vozdushnye Sily, VVS). The British supplied radar apparatuses, machine tools, ASDIC and other commodities. During the summer months, convoys went as far north as 75 N latitude then south into the Barents Sea and to the ports of Murmansk in the Kola Inlet and Archangel in the White Sea. In winter, due to the polar ice expanding southwards, the convoy route ran closer to Norway. The voyage was between 1,400 and 2,000 nmi (2,600 and 3,700 km; 1,600 and 2,300 mi) each way, taking at least three weeks for a round trip.

=== Convoy PQ 14 ===
The convoy, with six British, ten US, two Soviet, one Dutch and one Panamanian-flagged merchant ships, gathered at Oban on the west coast of Scotland (east of the Isle of Mull) and sailed for Iceland on 26 March 1942, with the escorts HMS Ambuscade, the Polish Grom class destroyer ORP Błyskawica, the B-class destroyer Bulldog, the ex-USN Town class destroyer Richmond and the Dance-class trawler HMT Tango. Convoys had a standard formation of short columns, number 1 to the left in the direction of travel. Each position in the column was numbered; 11 was the first ship in column 1 and 12 was the second ship in the column; 21 was the first ship in column 2. Ships in column sailed at intervals of 400 yd (370 m) until 1943 when the interval was increased to 600 yd (550 m) then 800 yd (730 m) to cater for inexperienced captains reluctant to keep so close.

The Ocean Escort was composed of the cruisers HMS Edinburgh and Norfolk with the F-class destroyers HMS Foresight and Forester. The distant escort (Vice-Admiral Alban Curteis) comprised the battleships HMS Duke of York and King George V, the aircraft carrier HMS Victorious, the County-class heavy cruiser HMS Kent, the Fiji-class light cruiser Nigeria with the Tribal-class destroyers HMS Bedouin, Eskimo and Somali, the E-class destroyer HMS Escapade and the F-class destroyer Faulknor, the Hunt-class destroyers HMS Belvoir, Ledbury, Middleton and Wheatland, the M-class destroyer HMS Matchless and the O-class destroyers HMS Offa and Onslow.

== Voyage ==
=== 8–12 April ===
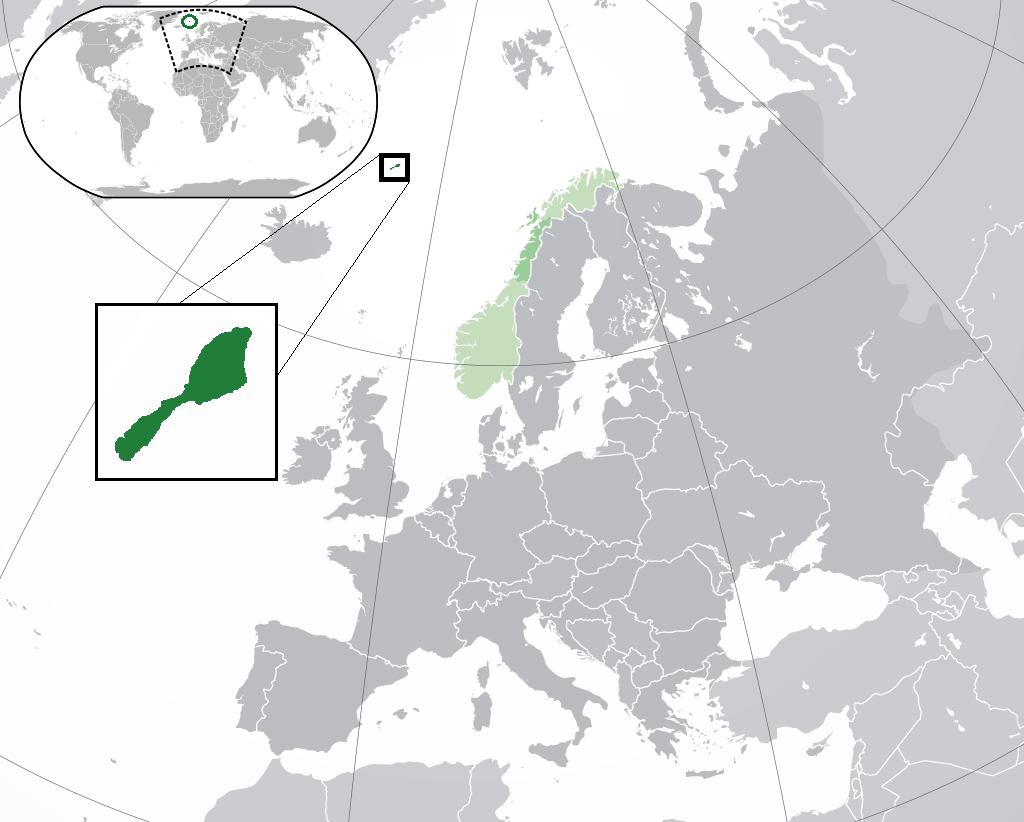
Jan Mayen island

Convoy PQ 14 sailed from Iceland on 8 April 1942 escorted from 8 to 12 April by the Hunt-class destroyer HMS Wilton, the Halcyon-class minesweepers HMS Hebe and Speedy and the anti-submarine trawlers HMT Chiltern and Northern Wave. On 9 April 120 nmi (220 km; 140 mi) south-west of Jan Mayen, the convoy rendezvoused with the destroyers HMS Amazon, the B-class destroyer HMS Beagle and Bulldog, the ex-US HMS Beverley the Flower-class corvettes HMS Campanula, Oxlip, Saxifrage and Snowflake, with the Admiralty trawler HMS Duncton and the requisitioned trawlers HMT Lord Austin and Lord Middleton.

The cruisers Edinburgh and Norfolk with the destroyers Foresight and Forrester sailed nearby. On the night of 10/11 April, south-west of Jan Mayen, the convoy ran into fog which held for thirty hours and sailed through pack ice for twelve hours. The convoy was thrown into disarray and many ships were damaged by the ice. Sixteen ships and the two minesweepers Hebe and Speedy were forced to turn back through damage or being unable to rejoin the convoy. The remaining eight ships, with Edinburgh and the twelve escorts, pressed on.

=== 13–14 April ===
Convoy PQ 14 had no interference from German forces, though its reciprocal, Convoy QP 10, was attacked from its departure from Murmansk until it passed Bear Island three days later. On 11 April a ship was bombed and sunk and on 12 April, a U-boat attacked a destroyer and sank two merchant ships. A freighter was severely damaged on 13 April and sunk by its escorts. After fog descended, followed by a storm, a reconnaissance aircraft arrived on 14 April but the Germans were preparing to attack Convoy PQ 14. Convoy QP 10 suffered the loss of four vessels but shot down six aircraft, damaged one and evaded two destroyer sorties.

=== 15–16 April ===
Map showing Bear Island (circled) and Jan Mayen to the south south-west

On 15 April, east of Bear Island, the convoy was sighted by German reconnaissance aircraft and desultory air attacks began. More determined air and submarine attacks were made on 16 April. Empire Howard was hit by three torpedoes fired by U-403, sinking within a minute of the first torpedo hit. Of the fifty-four men on board, about forty were able to abandon ship but the trawler Northern Wave was nearby when it depth-charged the U-boat, the shock of the explosions killing many of the crew in the water. The trawler Lord Middleton took 18 men on board, of whom nine, including Eric Rees the convoy commodore, died. Captain Downie survived and ascribed this to the insulating effect of becoming coated in oil. The vice-convoy commodore, Captain W. H. Lawrence, Master of Briarwood, took over. To the east of Bear Island, U-376 narrowly missed Edinburgh.

=== 17 April ===
At 4:30 a.m. on 17 April the convoy was joined by the local escort, comprising the Soviet destroyers Gremyashchy and Sokrushitelny, which had escorted Convoy QP 10 to 30°E then turned back with Convoy PQ 14. The Russian submarines K-1, K-2, K-3, S-101 and Shch-401 had provided a screen along the course of the convoy. At 5:00 a.m. several Ju 88 bombers arrived, one being shot down by the gunners on Briarwood as visibility was deteriorating; the bombers failed to hit any of the ships. At 7:50 a.m. the destroyer Bulldog attacked a submerged U-boat and claimed a possible sinking. The U-boat, possibly U-376, fired torpedoes to no effect as the convoy zig-zagged. Torpedo tracks were seen at 10:07 a.m. and Bulldog attacked with depth charges. As visibility got worse, no more air attacks were received.

=== 18–19 April ===
The German 8th Destroyer Flotilla had sortied from Kirkenes against Convoy QP 10 on 12 and 13 April and at 2:00 a.m. Bonham Carter ordered Edinburgh out of the convoy. The visibility had increased and the ship hoisted battle ensigns as it bore west towards the superstructures of Hermann Shoemann, Z24 and Z25 that were above the horizon; the destroyers turned away and faded from view. Later in the day an attack by aircraft, submarines and surface ships was anticipated, thick fog "saved the convoy's bacon". German aircraft could be heard above the low cloud and the convoy gunners held their fire to avoid giving away the position of the ships. The weather began to clear and the British minesweepers Gossamer, Harrier, Hussar and Niger, based at Kola Inlet, arrived, after turning back from Convoy QP 10. On the final leg to Kola, a north-westerly gale blew up. On 19 April the seven remaining ships entered Kola Inlet and docked at Murmansk. The ships and those of Convoy PQ 13 were attacked by Luftwaffe bombers as they were unloaded.

== Aftermath ==
Despite the safe arrival of seven ships of Convoy PQ 14, that so many ships were forced to turn back with ice damage meant that many Lend-lease deliveries to the USSR were forfeit and the Allies would have to run larger convoys during the hazardous summer months to catch up. Bonham Carter reported that the co-ordination of German aircraft and submarine attacks was a cause for concern as daylight hours increased towards the perpetual daylight of the midnight sun. Despite the recent reinforcement of convoy escorts, the last four days of the voyage would be under continuous observation and submarine attacks would increase just as the escorts were inhibited by shortage of fuel; Bonham Carter predicted serious losses.

== Allied order of battle ==
=== Merchant ships ===
Freighters (Note: Convoys had a standard formation of short columns, number 1 to the left in the direction of travel. Each position in the column was numbered; 11 was the first ship in column 1 and 12 was the second ship in the column; 21 was the first ship in column 2.)
Name	Year	Flag	GRT	Notes
RFA Aldersdale	1937	United Kingdom	8,402	Fleet oiler
Andre Marti	1918	Soviet Union	2,352	Returned Iceland, thence Britain
Arcos	1918	Soviet Union	2,343	Ice damage, returned Iceland
Atheltemplar	1930	Merchant Navy	8,992	Arrived Murmansk 19 April
Botavon	1912	Merchant Navy	5,848	Ice damage, returned Iceland
Briarwood	1930	Merchant Navy	4,019	8–19 April, Vice-convoy Commodore Captain W. H. Lawrence
British Corporal	1922	Merchant Navy	6,972	Ice damage, returned Iceland
City of Joliet	1920	United States	6,167	Ice damage, returned Iceland
Dan-Y-Bryn	1940	Merchant Navy	5,117	At Reykjavik 31 March to 8 April; arrived Murmansk 19 April
Empire Bard	1942	Merchant Navy	3,114	Heavy lift ship ice damage, returned Iceland
Empire Howard	1941	Merchant Navy	6,985	8–16 April, Commodore, Captain Eric Rees, sunk 16 April, U-403 25 killed
Exterminator	1924	Panama	6,115	Reykjavik 31 March, Sailed 8 April, detached 12 April to Convoy QP 10
Francis Scott Key	1941	United States	7,191	Reykjavik 31 March to 8 April; ice damage, returned Iceland
Hegira	1919	United States	7,588	At Reykjavik 31 March to 8 April, ice damage, returned Iceland
Hopemount	1929	Merchant Navy	7,434	Reykjavik 31 March to 8 April; arr. Murmansk 19 April
Ironclad	1919	United States	5,685	Arr. Reykjavik 31 March, Sailed 8 April, detached to Convoy QP 10
Minotaur	1918	United States	4,554	Ice damage, returned Iceland
Mormacrio	1919	United States	5,940	Ice damage, returned Iceland
Pieter De Hoogh	1941	Netherlands	7,168	Ice damage, returned Iceland
Seattle Spirit	1919	United States	5,627	Ice damage, returned Iceland
Sukhona	1918	Soviet Union	3,124	Ice damage, returned Iceland
Trehata	1928	Merchant Navy	4,817	Loch Ewe–Iceland Convoy UR 17; arrived Murmansk 19 April
West Cheswald	1919	United States	5,711	Reykjavik 31 March – 8 April; arrived Murmansk 19 April
West Gotomska	1918	United States	5,728	Ice damage, detached to Convoy QP 10
Yaka	1920	United States	5,432	Arrived Murmansk 19 April bombed, beached Murmansk 15 May 1942

=== Escorts ===
Escort forces
Name	Flag	Type	Notes
Oban to Reykjavík
ORP Błyskawica	Polish Navy	Grom-class destroyer	26 March –
HMS Bulldog	Royal Navy	B-class destroyer	26 March –
HMS Richmond	Royal Navy	Wickes-class destroyer	26 March –
HMT Tango	Royal Navy	Dance-class trawler	26 March –
Western local escort
HMS Wilton	Royal Navy	Hunt-class destroyer	8–12 April
HMS Hebe	Royal Navy	Halcyon-class minesweeper	8–13 April, ice damage, returned to Iceland
HMS Speedy	Royal Navy	Halcyon-class minesweeper	8–13 April, ice damage, returned to Iceland
HMT Chiltern	Royal Navy	ASW trawler	8–12 April
HMT Northern Wave	Royal Navy	ASW trawler	8–19 April
Oceanic escort
HMS Amazon	Royal Navy	Destroyer	12–19 April
HMS Beagle	Royal Navy	B-class destroyer	12–19 April
HMS Bulldog	Royal Navy	B-class destroyer	12–19 April
HMS Beverley	Royal Navy	Clemson-class destroyer	12–19 April
HMS Campanula	Royal Navy	Flower-class corvette	12–19 April
HMS Oxlip	Royal Navy	Flower-class corvette	12–19 April
HMS Saxifrage	Royal Navy	Flower-class corvette	12–19 April
HMS Snowflake	Royal Navy	Flower-class corvette	8–19 April
HMT Duncton	Royal Navy	ASW trawler	12–13 April
HMT Lord Austin	Royal Navy	ASW trawler	8–19 April
HMT Lord Middleton	Royal Navy	ASW trawler	8–19 April; rescued 18 crew Empire Howard; 9 survivors (Note: Northern Wave depth-charged the U-boat that sank Empire Howard close to the ship, killing many of the approximately 40 of the 54 crew who had abandoned ship.)
Distant cover (Home Fleet)
HMS Victorious	Royal Navy	Illustrious-class aircraft carrier	12–18 April
HMS Duke of York	Royal Navy	King George V-class battleship	12–18 April
HMS King George V	Royal Navy	King George V-class battleship	12–18 April
HMS Kent	Royal Navy	County-class cruiser	12–20 April
HMS Norfolk	Royal Navy	County-class cruiser	10–17 April, cruised south-west Bear Island
HMS Edinburgh	Royal Navy	Town-class cruiser	Failed to join
HMS Nigeria	Royal Navy	Fiji-class cruiser	12–18 April
HMS Eskimo	Royal Navy	Tribal-class destroyer	12–18 April
HMS Bedouin	Royal Navy	Tribal-class destroyer	12–18 April
HMS Somali	Royal Navy	Tribal-class destroyer	12–18 April
HMS Escapade	Royal Navy	E-class destroyer	12–18 April
HMS Faulknor	Royal Navy	F-class destroyer	12–18 April
HMS Foresight	Royal Navy	F-class destroyer	Failed to join
HMS Forester	Royal Navy	F-class destroyer	Failed to join
HMS Matchless	Royal Navy	M-class destroyer	12–18 April
HMS Offa	Royal Navy	O-class destroyer	12–18 April
HMS Onslow	Royal Navy	O-class destroyer	12–18 April
HMS Belvoir	Royal Navy	Hunt-class destroyer	12–13 April
HMS Ledbury	Royal Navy	Hunt-class destroyer	12–18 April
HMS Middleton	Royal Navy	Hunt-class destroyer	12–18 April
HMS Wheatland	Royal Navy	Hunt-class destroyer	12–13 April
Eastern local escort
Gremyashchy	Soviet Navy	Gnevny-class destroyer	17–19 April
Sokrushitelny	Soviet Navy	Gnevny-class destroyer	17–19 April
HMS Gossamer	Royal Navy	Halcyon-class minesweeper	18–19 April
HMS Harrier	Royal Navy	Halcyon-class minesweeper	18–19 April
HMS Hussar	Royal Navy	Halcyon-class minesweeper	18–19 April
HMS Niger	Royal Navy	Halcyon-class minesweeper	18–19 April
Soviet submarine screen
K-1	Soviet Navy	Soviet K-class submarine	
K-2	Soviet Navy	Soviet K-class submarine	
K-3	Soviet Navy	Soviet K-class submarine	
S-101	Soviet Navy	Soviet S-class submarine	
Shch-401	Soviet Navy	Shchuka-class submarine	

== German order of battle ==
=== Kriegsmarine ===
U-boats and ships
Name	Flag	Commander	Class	Notes
U-boats engaged
U-376	Kriegsmarine	Friedrich-Karl Marks	Type VIIC submarine	
U-403	Kriegsmarine	Heinz-Ehlert Clausen	Type VIIC submarine	16 April, sank Empire Howard
Destroyers
Z7 Hermann Schoemann	Kriegsmarine	Theodor Detmers	Type 1934A-class destroyer	
Z24	Kriegsmarine	Martin Saltzwedel	Type 1934A-class destroyer	
Z25	Kriegsmarine	Carl-Heinz Birnbacher	Type 1934A-class destroyer	

== See also ==
- Arctic naval operations of World War II

== Bibliography ==
- Budiansky, S. (2000). Battle of Wits: The Complete Story of Codebreaking in World War II. New York: The Free Press (Simon & Schuster). ISBN 0-684-85932-7 – via Archive Foundation.
- Butler, J. R. M. (1964). Grand Strategy: June 1941 – August 1942 (Part II). History of the Second World War, United Kingdom Military Series. Vol. III. London: HMSO. OCLC 504770038.
- Claasen, A. R. A. (2001). Hitler's Northern War: The Luftwaffe's Ill-fated Campaign, 1940–1945. Lawrence, KS: University Press of Kansas. ISBN 0-7006-1050-2.
- Edgerton, D. (2011). Britain's War Machine: Weapons, Resources and Experts in the Second World War. London: Allen Lane. ISBN 978-0-7139-9918-1.
- Hague, Arnold (2000). The Allied Convoy System 1939–1945: Its Organisation, Defence and Operation. London: Chatham. ISBN 978-1-55125-033-5.
- Hancock, W. K.; Gowing, M. M. (1949). Hancock, W. K. (ed.). British War Economy. History of the Second World War, United Kingdom Civil Series. London: HMSO. OCLC 630191560.
- Hinsley, F. H. (1981). British Intelligence in the Second World War: Its Influence on Strategy and Operations. History of the Second World War, United Kingdom Military Series. Vol. II. London: HMSO. ISBN 978-0-521-24290-5.
- Hinsley, F. H. (1994) [1993]. British Intelligence in the Second World War: Its Influence on Strategy and Operations. History of the Second World War, United Kingdom Military Series (2nd rev. abr. ed.). London: HMSO. ISBN 978-0-11-630961-7.
- Howard, M. (1972). Grand Strategy: August 1942 – September 1943. History of the Second World War United Kingdom Military Series. Vol. IV. London: HMSO. ISBN 978-0-11-630075-1 – via Archive Foundation.
- Kahn, D. (1973) [1967]. The Codebreakers: The Story of Secret Writing (10th abr. Signet, Chicago ed.). New York: Macmillan. LCCN 63-16109. OCLC 78083316.
- Llewellyn-Jones, Malcolm, ed. (2014) [2007]. The Royal Navy and the Arctic Convoys: A Naval Staff History (2nd pbk. ed.). London: Routledge. ISBN 978-0-415-86177-9.
- Rohwer, Jürgen; Hümmelchen, Gerhard (2005) [1972]. Chronology of the War at Sea, 1939–1945: The Naval History of World War Two (3rd rev. ed.). London: Chatham. ISBN 978-1-86176-257-3.
- Roskill, S. W. (1962) [1956]. The Period of Balance. History of the Second World War: The War at Sea 1939–1945. Vol. II (3rd impr. ed.). London: HMSO. OCLC 174453986 – via Hyperwar.
- Ruegg, R.; Hague, A. (1993) [1992]. Convoys to Russia: Allied Convoys and Naval Surface Operations in Arctic Waters 1941–1945 (2nd rev. enl. ed.). Kendal: World Ship Society. ISBN 0-905617-66-5.
- Sharpe, Peter (1998). U-Boat Fact File: Detailed Service Histories of the Submarines operated by the Kriegsmarine, 1935–1945. East Shilton: Midland Publishing. ISBN 978-1-85-780072-2.
- Woodman, Richard (2004) [1994]. Arctic Convoys 1941–1945. London: John Murray. ISBN 978-0-7195-5752-1.
