= Convoy QP 10 =

Arctic convoy of World War II

- Part of Arctic Convoys of the Second World War
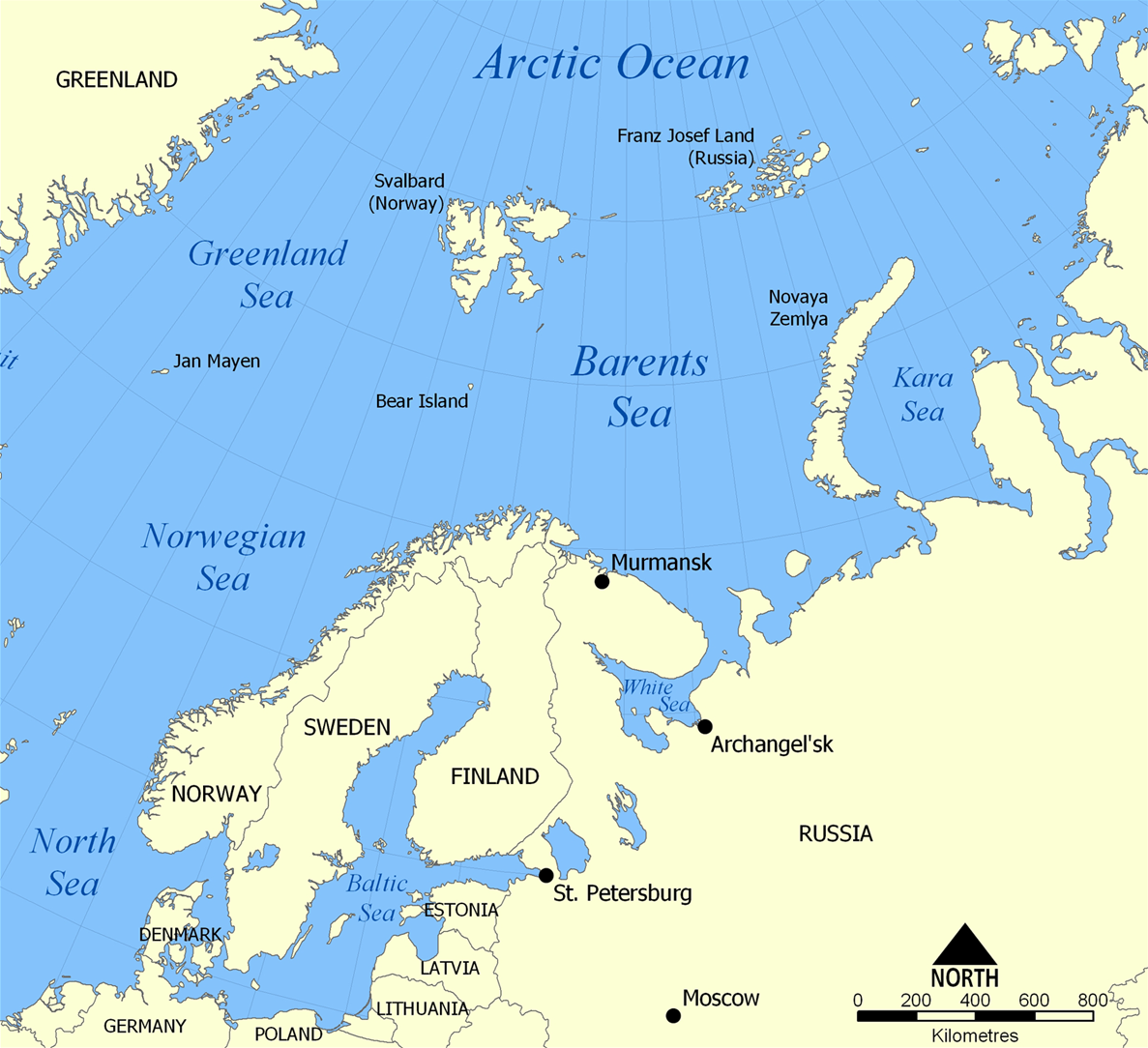
- The Norwegian and the Barents seas, site of the Arctic convoys
Date	10–21 April 1942
Location	Arctic Ocean
Result	British victory

Belligerents
Merchant Navy; Royal Navy; Soviet Union; United States; Panama; Honduras	Kriegsmarine; Luftwaffe

Commanders and leaders
Convoy: D. A Casey; Escort: John McBeath	Hans-Jürgen Stumpff; Hubert Schmundt

Strength
16 Merchant ships; 9 Escorts	3 Destroyers; 6 U-boats

Casualties and losses
4 merchant ships sunk, Aircraft: 2; U-boats: 2; 1 damaged by aircraft	6 Junkers Ju 88s shot down; 1 Junkers Ju 88 damaged

Convoy QP 10 (10–21 April 1942) was an Arctic convoy of the Second World War, consisting of empty merchant ships returning from Murmansk in the Soviet Union. The convoy had 16 merchant ships and an escort of nine warships. The convoy was attacked by German U-boats and aircraft, resulting in the loss of four merchant ships. Stone Street was damaged by air attack and forced to turn back to the Kola Inlet. The convoy escorts shot down six German aircraft and damaged another during the voyage and arrived at Reykjavík on 21 April.

Luftflotte 5 had been reinforced from 152 aircraft in January to 175 in February and 221 in March, that made it a much more capable anti-shipping force. On 13 April, Adolf Hitler stressed to Admiral Erich Raeder, the head of Oberkommando der Marine (the professional head of the navy) that "attacks on the Murmansk convoys are most important at the moment".

On 17 April, Vice-Admiral Henry Moore, the Vice-Chief of the Naval Staff, reported that the losses of Convoy QP 10 and the reciprocal Convoy QP 14 were more than 20 per cent. As the weather improved, convoy losses would increase. The increased number of U-boats also required more convoy escorts to counter them only possible if the frequency of Arctic convoys was reduced to three in two months and no more than 25 ships each.

== Background ==
=== Arctic convoys ===
Hvalfjörður in Iceland

In October 1941, after Operation Barbarossa, the German invasion of the USSR, which had begun on 22 June, the Prime Minister, Winston Churchill, made a commitment to send a convoy to the Arctic ports of the USSR every ten days and to deliver 1,200 tanks a month from July 1942 to January 1943, followed by 2,000 tanks and another 3,600 aircraft more than already promised. (Note: In October 1941, the unloading capacity of Arkhangelsk was 300,000 long tons (300,000 t), Vladivostok in the Pacific 140,000 long tons (140,000 t) and 60,000 long tons (61,000 t) from the Persian Gulf.) The first convoy was due at Murmansk around 12 October and the next convoy was to depart Iceland on 22 October. A motley of British, Allied and neutral shipping loaded with military stores and raw materials for the Soviet war effort would be assembled at Hvalfjörður in Iceland, convenient for ships from both sides of the Atlantic.

By late 1941, the convoy system used in the Atlantic had been established on the Arctic run. A convoy commodore ensured that the ships' masters and signals officers attended a briefing before sailing, to make arrangements for the management of the convoy, which sailed in a formation of long rows of short columns. The commodore was usually a retired naval officer, aboard a ship identified by a white pendant with a blue cross. The commodore was assisted by a Naval signals party of four men, who used lamps, semaphore flags and telescopes to pass signals, coded from books carried in a bag, weighted to be dumped overboard. In large convoys, the commodore was assisted by vice- and rear-commodores who directed the speed, course and zig-zagging of the merchant ships and liaised with the escort commander. (Note: By the end of 1941, 187 Matilda II and 249 Valentine tanks had been delivered, comprising 25 per cent of the medium-heavy tanks in the Red Army, making 30–40 per cent of the medium-heavy tanks defending Moscow. In December 1941, 16 per cent of the fighters defending Moscow were Hawker Hurricanes and Curtiss Tomahawks from Britain and by 1 January 1942, 96 Hurricane fighters were flying in the Soviet Air Forces (Voyenno-Vozdushnye Sily, VVS). The British supplied radar apparatus, machine tools, Asdic and commodities.)

=== First Protocol ===
The Soviet leaders needed to replace the colossal losses of military equipment after the Operation Barbarossa the German invasion began, especially when Soviet war industries were being moved out of the war zone and emphasised tank and aircraft deliveries. Machine tools, steel and aluminium was needed to replace indigenous resources lost in the invasion. The pressure on the civilian sector of the economy needed to be alleviated by food deliveries. The Soviets wanted to concentrate the resources that remained on items that the Soviet war economy that had the greatest comparative advantage over the German economy. Aluminium imports allowed aircraft production to a far greater extent than would have been possible using local sources and tank production was emphasised at the expense of lorries; food supplies were squeezed by reliance on what could be obtained from lend–lease. At the Moscow Conference, it was acknowledged that 1.5 million tons of shipping was needed to transport the supplies of the First Protocol and that Soviet sources could provide less than 10 per cent of the carrying capacity.

The British and Americans accepted that the onus was on them to find most of the shipping, despite their commitments in other theatres. The Prime Minister, Winston Churchill, made a commitment to send a convoy to the Arctic ports of the USSR every ten days and to deliver 1,200 tanks a month from July 1942 to January 1943, followed by 2,000 tanks and another 3,600 aircraft more than already promised. In November, the US president, Franklin D. Roosevelt, ordered Admiral Emory Land of the US Maritime Commission and then the head of the War Shipping Administration that deliveries to Russia should only be limited by 'insurmountable difficulties'. The first convoy was due at Murmansk around 12 October and the next convoy was to depart Iceland on 22 October. A motley of British, Allied and neutral shipping loaded with military stores and raw materials for the Soviet war effort would be assembled at Hvalfjörður in Iceland, convenient for ships from both sides of the Atlantic.

From Operation Dervish to Convoy PQ 11, the supplies to the USSR were mostly British, in British ships defended by the Royal Navy. A fighter force that could defend Murmansk was delivered that protected the Arctic ports and railways into the hinterland. British supplied aircraft and tanks reinforced the Russian defences of Leningrad and Moscow from December 1941. The tanks and aircraft did not save Moscow but were important in the Soviet counter-offensive. The Luftwaffe was by then reduced to 600 operational aircraft on the Eastern Front, to an extent a consequence of Luftflotte 2 being sent to the Mediterranean against the British. Tanks and aircraft supplied by Britain helped the Soviet counter-offensive force back the Germans further than might have been possible without them. In January and February 1942, deliveries of tanks and aircraft allowed the Russians to have a margin of safety should the German army attempt a riposte.

Post-war criticism of the quality of British supplies contradicted the praise offered to the Foreign Secretary, Anthony Eden, in Moscow in December, of the performance of Hurricane fighters and Valentine tanks; Matilda tanks were admittedly inferior in snow but were expected to operate better in the summer. Deliveries helped to improve the long-term potential of the Soviet war economy, the 17,000 long tons (17,000 t) of aluminium sent from Britain was the equivalent to the capacity lost in the Soviet Union in the six months from October 1941 and 10,000 long tons (10,000 t) each of copper and rubber were generally useful to the Soviet economy, especially after rubber from Malaya was cut off by the Malayan campaign (8 December 1941 – 15 February 1942). Radar and Asdic apparatuses improved Russian anti-aircraft defences and the naval protection of the Arctic ports. In the first winter of the war in Russia the British helped to tide the USSR over at some cost to British grand strategy; the 700 fighters and about 500 tanks sent to Russia in 1941 could have made a substantial difference to British fortunes in the Middle East and Far East. The Germans laid plans to stop the Arctic convoys in 1942.

=== Signals intelligence ===
==== Bletchley Park ====
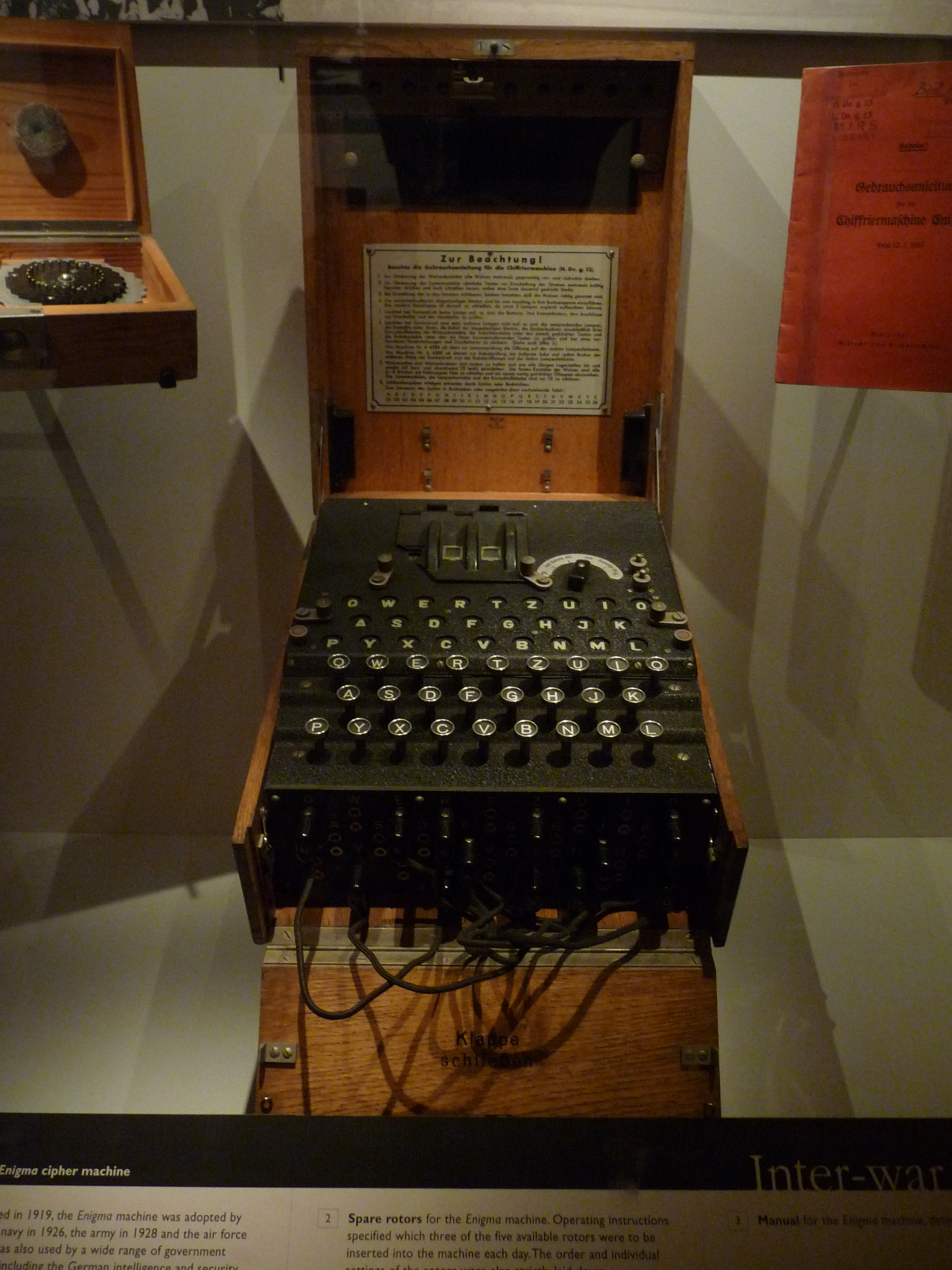
Photograph of a German Enigma coding machine

The British Government Code and Cypher School (GC&CS) based at Bletchley Park housed a small industry of code-breakers and traffic analysts. By June 1941, the German Enigma machine Home Waters (Heimish) settings used by surface ships and U-boats could quickly be read. On 1 February 1942, the Enigma machines used in U-boats in the Atlantic and Mediterranean were changed but German ships and the U-boats in Arctic waters continued with the older Heimish (Hydra from 1942, Dolphin to the British). By mid-1941, British Y-stations were able to receive and read Luftwaffe W/T transmissions and give advance warning of Luftwaffe operations.

==== B-Dienst ====
The rival German Beobachtungsdienst (B-Dienst, Observation Service) of the Kriegsmarine Marinenachrichtendienst (MND, Naval Intelligence Service) had broken several Admiralty codes and cyphers by 1939, which were used to help Kriegsmarine ships elude British forces and provide opportunities for surprise attacks. From June to August 1940, six British submarines were sunk in the Skaggerak using information gleaned from British wireless signals. In 1941, B-Dienst read signals from the Commander in Chief Western Approaches informing convoys of areas patrolled by U-boats, enabling the submarines to move into "safe" zones. B-Dienst had broken Naval Cypher No 3 in February 1942 and by March was reading up to 80 per cent of the traffic, which continued until 15 December 1943. By coincidence, the British lost access to Atlantic U-boat communications with the introduction of the Shark cypher and had no information to send in Cypher No 3 which might compromise Ultra.

=== Arctic Ocean ===
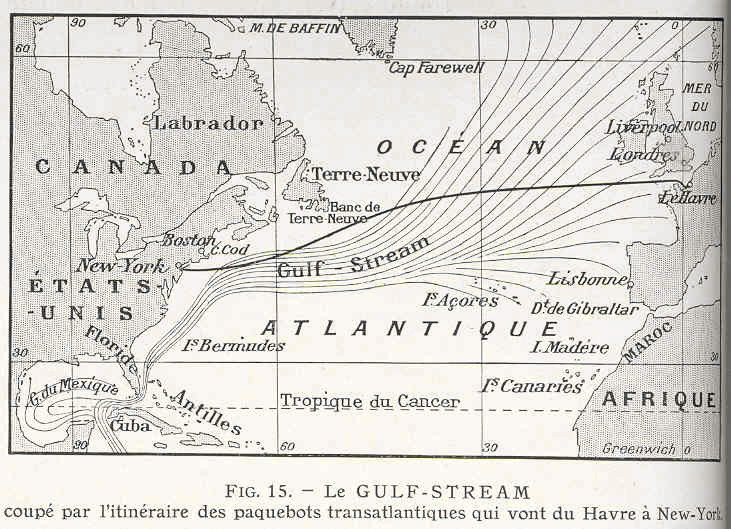
Diagrammatic representation of the course of the Gulf Stream

Between Greenland and Norway are some of the most stormy waters of the world's oceans, 890 mi (1,440 km) of water under gales full of snow, sleet and hail. The cold Arctic water is met by the Gulf Stream, warm water from the Gulf of Mexico, which becomes the North Atlantic Drift. Arriving at the south-west of England the drift moves between Scotland and Iceland; north of Norway the drift splits. One stream bears north of Bear Island to Svalbard and a southern stream follows the coast of Murmansk into the Barents Sea. The mingling of cold Arctic water and warmer water of higher salinity generates thick banks of fog for convoys to hide in but the waters drastically reduced the effectiveness of ASDIC as U-boats moved in waters of differing temperatures and density.

In winter, polar ice can form as far south as 50 mi (80 km) off the North Cape and in summer it can recede to Svalbard. The area is in perpetual darkness in winter and permanent daylight in the summer and can make air reconnaissance almost impossible. Around the North Cape and in the Barents Sea the sea temperature rarely rises about 4° Celsius and a person in the water will die unless rescued immediately. The cold water and air makes spray freeze on the superstructures of ships, which has to be removed quickly to prevent ships becoming top-heavy. Conditions in U-boats were, if anything, worse, the boats having to submerge in warmer water to rid the superstructure of ice. Crewmen on watch were exposed to the elements, oil lost its viscosity, nuts froze and sheared off. Heaters in the hull were too demanding of current to be run continuously.

== Prelude ==
=== Kriegsmarine ===
German naval forces in Norway were commanded by Hermann Böhm, the Kommandierender Admiral Norwegen. Two U-boats were based in Norway in July 1941, four in September, five in December and four in January 1942. By mid-February twenty U-boats were anticipated in the region, with six based in Norway, two in Narvik or Tromsø, two at Trondheim and two at Bergen. Hitler contemplated establishing a unified command but decided against it. The German battleship Tirpitz arrived at Trondheim on 16 January, the first ship of a general transfer of surface ships to Norway. British convoys to Russia had received little attention, since they averaged only eight ships each and the long Arctic winter nights negated even the limited Luftwaffe effort that was available.

=== Luftflotte 5 ===
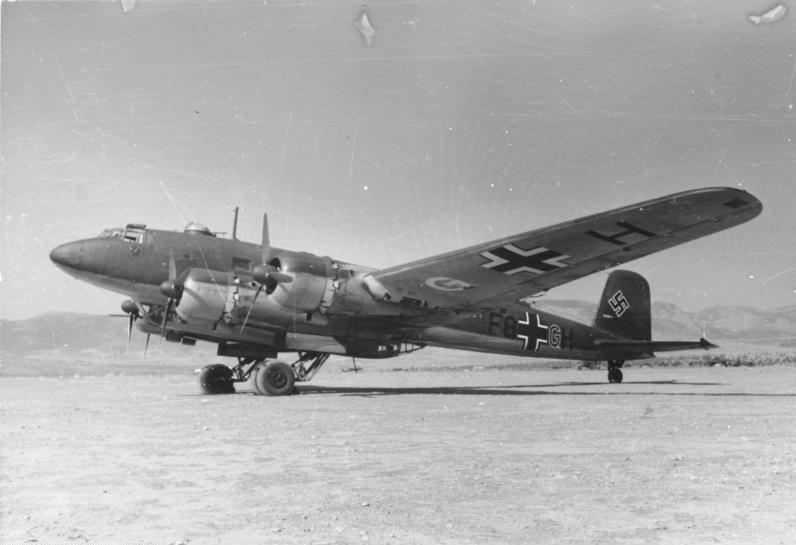
A Focke-Wulf Fw 200 Kondor of KG 40

In mid-1941, Luftflotte 5 (Air Fleet 5) had been re-organised for Operation Barbarossa when Luftgau Norwegen (Air Region Norway) was headquartered in Oslo. Fliegerführer Stavanger (Air Commander Stavanger) the centre and north of Norway, Jagdfliegerführer Norwegen (Fighter Leader Norway) commanded the fighter force and Fliegerführer Kerkenes (Oberst [colonel] Andreas Nielsen) in the far north had airfields at Kirkenes and Banak. The Air Fleet had 180 aircraft, sixty of which were reserved for operations on the Karelian Front against the Red Army. The distance from Banak to Arkhangelsk was 560 mi (900 km) and Fliegerführer Kerkenes had only ten Junkers Ju 88 bombers of Kampfgeschwader 30, thirty Stukas, ten Messerschmitt Bf 109 fighters of Jagdgeschwader 77, five Messerschmitt Bf 110 heavy fighters of Zerstörergeschwader 76, ten reconnaissance aircraft and an anti-aircraft battalion.

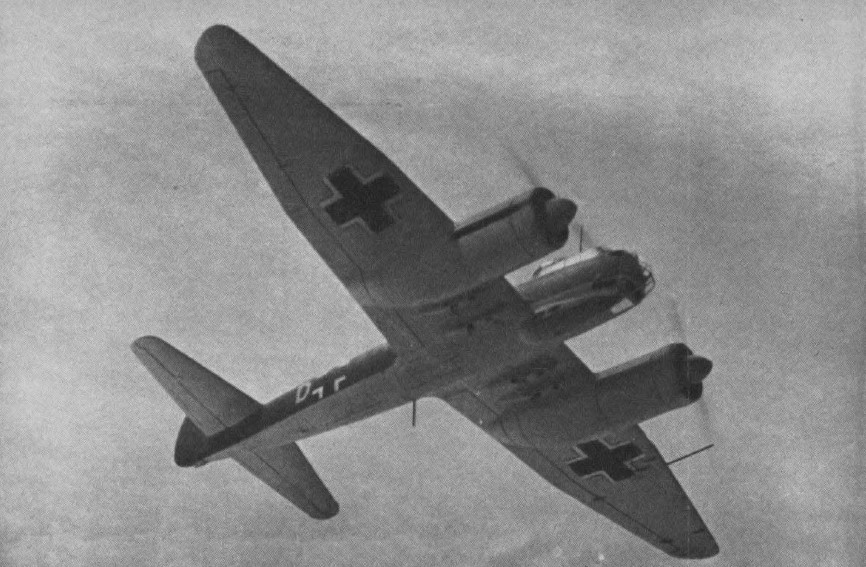
A Ju 88 similar to the ones that attacked Convoy QP 10

Sixty aircraft were far from adequate in such a climate and terrain where "there is no favourable season for operations" (Earl F. Ziemke). The emphasis of air operations changed from army support to anti-shipping operations as Allied Arctic convoys became more frequent. Hubert Schmundt, the Admiral Nordmeer noted gloomily on 22 December 1941 that the number long-range reconnaissance aircraft was exiguous and from 1 to 15 December only two Ju 88 sorties had been possible. After the Lofoten Raids (Operation Claymore) Schmundt wanted Luftflotte 5 to transfer aircraft to northern Norway but its commander, Generaloberst Hans-Jürgen Stumpff, was reluctant to deplete the defences of western Norway.

Some air units were transferred, a catapult ship (Katapultschiff), MS Schwabenland, was sent to northern Norway and Heinkel He 115 floatplane torpedo-bombers, of Küstenfliegergruppe 1./406 was transferred to Sola. By the end of 1941, III Gruppe, KG 30 had been transferred to Norway and in the new year, another Staffel of Focke-Wulf Fw 200 Kondors from Kampfgeschwader 40 (KG 40) arrived. Luftflotte 5 was also expected to receive a Gruppe comprising three Staffeln (squadrons) of Heinkel He 111 torpedo-bombers. Reinforcements increased the number of first-line aircraft from 152 aircraft in January to 175 in February and 221 in March.

==== Air-sea rescue ====
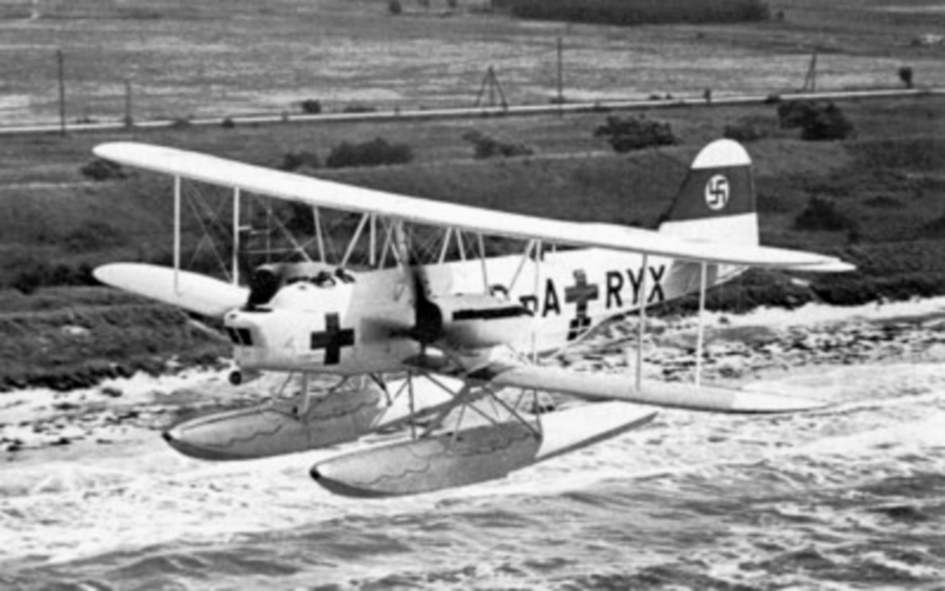
Example of a Heinkel He 59 search and rescue aircraft (1940)

The Luftwaffe Sea Rescue Service (Seenotdienst) along with the Kriegsmarine, the Norwegian Society for Sea Rescue (RS) and ships on passage, recovered aircrew and shipwrecked sailors. The service comprised Seenotbereich VIII at Stavanger, covering Bergen and Trondheim with Seenotbereich IX at Kirkenes for Tromsø, Billefjord and Kirkenes. Co-operation was as important in rescues as it was in anti-shipping operations if people were to be saved before they succumbed to the climate and severe weather. The sea rescue aircraft comprised Heinkel He 59 floatplanes, Dornier Do 18 and Dornier Do 24 seaplanes. Oberkommando der Luftwaffe (OKL, the high command of the Luftwaffe) was not able to increase the number of search and rescue aircraft in Norway, due to a general shortage of aircraft and crews, despite Stumpff pointing out that coming down in such cold waters required extremely swift recovery and that his crews "must be given a chance of rescue" or morale could not be maintained.

== Convoy and escorts ==
Convoy QP 10 consisted of 16 merchant ships (convoy commodore D. A. Casey) with a local escort, from 10 to 12 April, of the Soviet destroyers Gremyashchiy, Sokrushitelny and the Halcyon-class minesweepers Gossamer, Harrier and Hussar as far as 30° East, where they were to transfer to the incoming Convoy PQ 14. From 10 to 21 April, the oceanic escort consisted of the cruiser HMS Liverpool, the destroyers HMS Oribi, Punjabi, Fury, Eclipse and Marne, the Halcyon-class minesweeper HMS Speedwell and the ASW trawlers HMT Blackfly and Paynter. Between Iceland and Norway a Home Fleet distant covering force consisted of the battleships HMS Duke of York and King George V, the aircraft carrier HMS Victorious, the cruisers HMS Kent and Nigeria and 12 destroyers, in case of a sortie by the German heavy ships in Norway. A flank guard was arranged with the Soviet Navy that included the submarines K-1, K-2, K-3, S-101 and Shch-401 that was to close on the coast as the convoys progressed.

== Voyage ==
=== 10–11 April ===
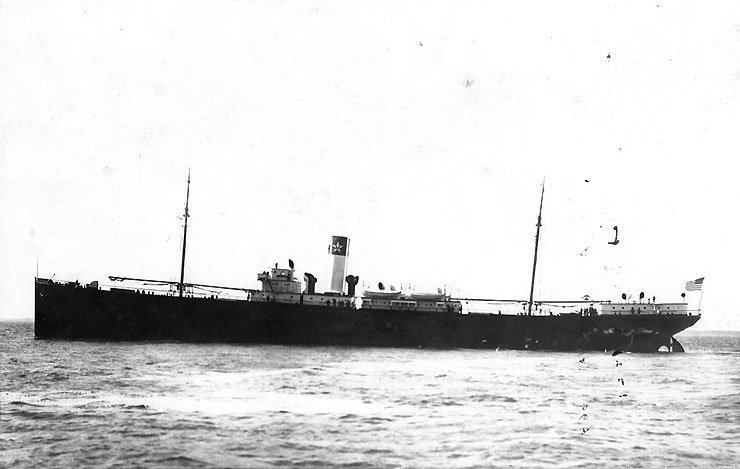
SS El Occidente

Convoy QP 10 departed Murmansk at 17:00 on 10 April, accompanied as far as longitude 30° east by the usual local escorts of British minesweepers and Soviet destroyers as well as the oceanic escort. Attacks on the convoy began during its departure from Murmansk by U-boats and aircraft. On 11 April, the Soviet Air Forces (Voenno-Vozdushnye Sily, VVS) attacked the Luftflotte 5 base at Kirkenes, albeit with little effect. Junkers Ju 88 bombers of III./Kampfgeschwader 30 attacked the convoy and the merchant ship Empire Cowper was hit by three 500 lb (230 kg) bombs. Paynter rescued survivors as the ship was sinking and Harpalion shot down one of the Ju 88s. On 12 April, the German destroyers Z7 Hermann Schoemann, Z24 and Z25 of the 8th Destroyer Flotilla, sortied against the convoy but failed to find it.

=== 12/13 April ===
At 01:00 during the night of 12/13 April, the convoy was attacked by U-435 (Korvettenkapitän Siegfried Strelow). After a failed torpedo attack on Punjabi, U-435 evaded the escorts and torpedoed the Russian freighter Kiev. At 03:30, U-435 hit the Panamanian El Occidente which sank almost immediately. Near dawn, an attack by U-209 failed but at around 05:00, Ju 88s of III./KG 30 returned and circled the convoy for about an hour before attacking Harpalion, causing damage to its steering gear and breaking the rudder, making the ship unmanageable. The crew of Harpalion tried to jury-rig a replacement but their attempts were halted by four Ju 88s strafing the deck with machine-guns and the ship was scuttled by Fury. Thick fog and a westerly gale later in the day forced an end to the German attacks. Hermann Schoemann, Z24 and Z25 tried to find the convoy again but turned back because of the weather.

=== 14–21 April ===
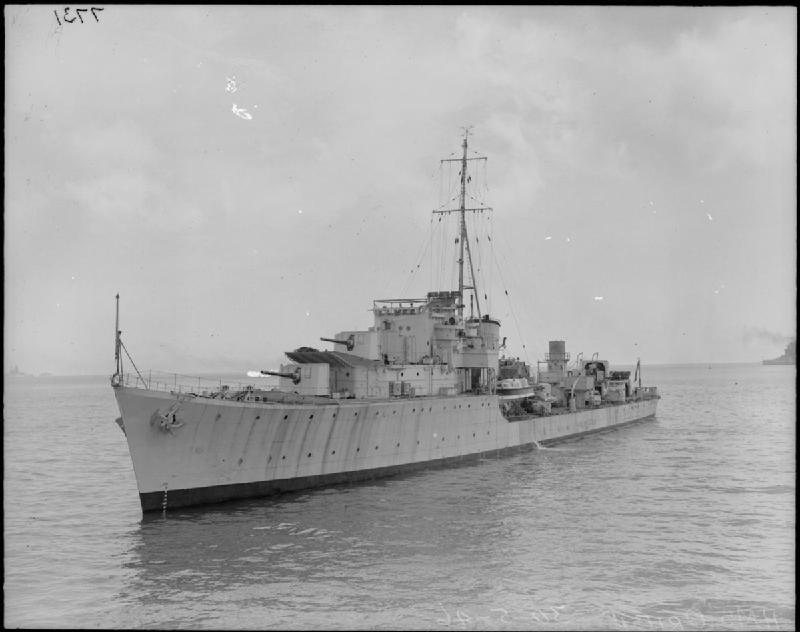
HMS Oribi, photographed after the war

A reconnaissance aircraft found the outbound Convoy PQ 14 on 14 April and there were fitful air attacks from 15 to 17 April that had no effect. Attacks on Convoy QP 10 by U-376, U-377 U-403 were seen off by the escorts but on 17 April, U-376 nearly hit Edinburgh of Convoy PQ 14, to the east of Bear Island. As Convoy QP 10 crossed Convoy PQ 14, it was joined by six ships from the outbound convoy that had to turn back because of ice and weather damage. The convoy underwent no more attacks and reached Reykjavík in Iceland on 21 April.

== Aftermath ==
=== Analysis ===
The convoy lost two ships to bombers, one was severely damaged and two ships were sunk by U-435. Success cost the Luftwaffe six bombers shot down by anti-aircraft fire from the escorts and one aircraft damaged, a sign of the increasing efficiency of the escort and merchant ships. On 13 April, Adolf Hitler stressed to Grand Admiral (Großadmiral) Erich Raeder, the Oberkommando der Marine, (Commander-in-Chief of the Kriegsmarine) that "attacks on the Murmansk convoys are most important at the moment". On 17 April, Vice-Admiral Henry Moore, the Vice-Chief of the Naval Staff, reported that the losses of Convoy QP 10 and the reciprocal Convoy QP 14 was more than 20 per cent and as the weather improved, convoy losses could only increase. The recent reinforcements in front-line aircraft for Luftflotte 5, from 152 aircraft in January to 175 in February and 221 in March made the force much more capable. The increased number of submarines also required a parallel increase in the escorts and this would only be possible if the frequency of Arctic convoys was reduced to three in two months and no more than 25 ships per convoy.

=== Subsequent events ===
The Admiralty view of the summer of 1942 caused dismay in the US Government, as there was a queue of ships waiting to be convoyed to the USSR, exacerbated by the six early returns from Convoy PQ 14. The US had dispatched 63 ships to Iceland in April but only seven ships reached the USSR that month, against forty in March and the US government had expected 107 ships to reach the Arctic ports in May. The Admiralty view that smaller convoys be dispatched due to a shortage of escorts caused much awkwardness between the US president, Franklin D. Roosevelt and the British Prime Minister, Winston Churchill, that abated somewhat when Convoy PQ 15 departed Iceland with 35 ships. The Admiralty claimed that 75 ships sailing over two months could meet western supply commitments if loaded carefully but this took no account of losses and the US perforce had to reduce their ambitions and only 21 ships left the US for Iceland during May and June; some ships were sent to the Persian Gulf instead.

== Allied order of battle ==
=== Convoyed ships ===
Merchant ships in convoy. (Note: Convoys had a standard formation of short columns, number 1 to the left in the direction of travel. Each position in the column was numbered; 11 was the first ship in column 1 and 12 was the second ship in the column; 21 was the first ship in column 2.)
Ship	Year	Flag	GRT	P'n	Notes
Convoy QP 10
SS Artigas	1920	Panama	5,163	32	
SS Beaconstreet	1927	Merchant Navy	7,467	41	
SS Belomorcanal	1936	Soviet Union	2,900	12	
SS Capulin	1920	Soviet Union	4,977	42	
SS Dneprostroi	1919	Soviet Union	4,756	33	
SS El Coston	1924	Panama	7,286	52	
SS El Occidente	1910	Panama	6,008	51	Sunk, 13 April, U-435
SS Empire Cowper	1941	Merchant Navy	7,164	34	Sunk, 11 April, Ju 88s, 71°91′N, 36°00′E
SS Harpalion	1932	Merchant Navy	5,486	13	Sunk, 11 April, Ju 88s, 73°33′N, 27°19′E 0† 77 surv
SS Kiev	1917	Soviet Union	5,823	22	Damaged, aircraft, sunk, 13 April, U-435, 73°22′N, 28°48′E
SS Mana	1920	Honduras	3,283	53	
SS Navarino	1937	Merchant Navy	4,841	21	Vice-Convoy Commodore embarked
SS River Afton	1935	Merchant Navy	5,479	23	
SS Sevzaples	1932	Soviet Union	3,974	11	
SS Stone Street	1922	Merchant Navy	6,131	43	Damaged, enemy action, returned to Kola Inlet
SS Temple Arch	1940	Merchant Navy	5,134	31	Captain D. A. Casey, Convoy Commodore embarked
Damaged ships from Convoy PQ 14 joining Convoy QP 10
SS City of Joliet	1920	United States	6,167	35	Ice and weather damage
SS Francis Scott Key	1941	United States	7,191	14	Ice and weather damage
SS Ironclad	1919	United States	5,685	54	Ice and weather damage
SS Minotaur	1918	United States	4,553	55	Ice and weather damage
SS Mormacrio	1919	United States	5,940	24	Ice and weather damage
SS West Gotomska	1919	United States	5,728	44	Ice and weather damage

=== Escorts ===
Murmansk to Reykjavík (relays)
Ship	Flag	Type	Notes
Eastern local escort
Gremyashchy	Soviet Navy	Gnevny-class destroyer	10 to 12 April
Sokrushitelny	Soviet Navy	Gnevny-class destroyer	10 to 12 April
HMS Gossamer	Royal Navy	Halcyon-class minesweeper	10 to 12 April
HMS Harrier	Royal Navy	Halcyon-class minesweeper	10 to 12 April
HMS Hussar	Royal Navy	Halcyon-class minesweeper	10 to 12 April
Soviet submarine flank guard
K-1	Soviet Navy	Soviet K-class submarine	
K-2	Soviet Navy	Soviet K-class submarine	
K-3	Soviet Navy	Soviet K-class submarine	
S-101	Soviet Navy	Soviet S-class submarine	
Shch-401	Soviet Navy	Shchuka-class submarine	
Oceanic escort
HMS Liverpool	Royal Navy	Town-class cruiser	12 to 18 April
HMS Punjabi	Royal Navy	Tribal-class destroyer	10 to 21 April
HMS Eclipse	Royal Navy	E-class destroyer	10 to 17 April
HMS Fury	Royal Navy	F-class destroyer	10 to 21 April
HMS Marne	Royal Navy	M-class destroyer	10 to 21 April
HMS Oribi	Royal Navy	O-class destroyer	10 to 21 April, escort commander, Commander John McBeath
HMS Speedwell	Royal Navy	Halcyon-class minesweeper	10 to 17 April
HMT Blackfly	Royal Navy	ASW trawler	10 to 17 April
HMT Paynter	Royal Navy	ASW trawler	10 to 17 April
Distant escort (Home Fleet)
HMS Victorious	Royal Navy	Illustrious-class aircraft carrier	10–18 April
HMS Duke of York	Royal Navy	King George V-class battleship	10–18 April
HMS King George V	Royal Navy	King George V-class battleship	10–18 April
HMS Kent	Royal Navy	County-class cruiser	10–20 April
HMS Norfolk	Royal Navy	County-class cruiser	10–17 April, cruised south-west of Bear Island
HMS Edinburgh	Royal Navy	Town-class cruiser	Failed to join
HMS Nigeria	Royal Navy	Fiji-class cruiser	10–18 April
HMS Eskimo	Royal Navy	Tribal-class destroyer	10–18 April
HMS Bedouin	Royal Navy	Tribal-class destroyer	10–18 April
HMS Somali	Royal Navy	Tribal-class destroyer	10–18 April
HMS Escapade	Royal Navy	E-class destroyer	10–18 April
HMS Faulknor	Royal Navy	F-class destroyer	10–18 April
HMS Foresight	Royal Navy	F-class destroyer	Failed to join
HMS Forester	Royal Navy	F-class destroyer	Failed to join
HMS Matchless	Royal Navy	M-class destroyer	10–18 April
HMS Offa	Royal Navy	O-class destroyer	10–18 April
HMS Onslow	Royal Navy	O-class destroyer	10–18 April
HMS Belvoir	Royal Navy	Hunt-class destroyer	10–13 April
HMS Ledbury	Royal Navy	Hunt-class destroyer	10–18 April
HMS Middleton	Royal Navy	Hunt-class destroyer	10–18 April
HMS Wheatland	Royal Navy	Hunt-class destroyer	10–13 April

== German order of battle ==
Kriegsmarine
Name	Flag	Class	Notes
8th Destroyer Flotilla
Z7 Hermann Schoemann	Kriegsmarine	Type 1934A-class destroyer	
Z24	Kriegsmarine	Type 1936A-class destroyer	
Z25	Kriegsmarine	Type 1936A-class destroyer	
U-boats
U-209	Kriegsmarine	Heinrich Brodda	Type VIIC submarine
U-376	Kriegsmarine	Friedrich-Karl Marks	Type VIIC submarine
U-377	Kriegsmarine	Otto Köhler	Type VIIC submarine
U-403	Kriegsmarine	Heinz-Ehlert Clausen	Type VIIC submarine
U-435	Kriegsmarine	Siegfried Strelow	Type VIIC submarine, 1st U-boat Flotilla
Luftflotte 5
III./Kampfgeschwader 30	Luftwaffe	Junkers Ju 88	2 ships sunk, 1 damaged; 6 Ju 88s shot down, 1 damaged

== Bibliography ==
- Boog, H.; Rahn, W.; Stumpf, R.; Wegner, B. (2001). The Global War: Widening of the Conflict into a World War and the Shift of the Initiative 1941–1943. Germany in the Second World War. Vol. VI. Translated by Osers, E.; Brownjohn, J.; Crampton, P.; Willmot, L. (Eng trans. Oxford University Press, London ed.). Potsdam: Militärgeschichtliches Forschungsamt (Research Institute for Military History). ISBN 0-19-822888-0.
  - Rahn, W. "Part III, the War at Sea in the Atlantic and in the Arctic Ocean. III. The Conduct of the War in the Atlantic and the Coastal Area (b) The Third Phase, April–December 1941: The Extension of the Areas of Operations". In Boog et al. (2001).
- Boyd, Andrew (2024). Arms for Russia & the Naval War in the Arctic 1941–1945. Barnsley: Seaforth (Pen & Sword). ISBN 978-1-3990-3886-7.
- Budiansky, S. (2000). Battle of Wits: The Complete Story of Codebreaking in World War II. New York: The Free Press (Simon & Schuster). ISBN 0-684-85932-7 – via Archive Foundation.
- Claasen, A. R. A. (2001). Hitler's Northern War: The Luftwaffe's Ill-fated Campaign, 1940–1945. Lawrence, KS: University Press of Kansas. ISBN 0-7006-1050-2.
- Edgerton, D. (2011). Britain's War Machine: Weapons, Resources and Experts in the Second World War. London: Allen Lane. ISBN 978-0-7139-9918-1.
- Hinsley, F. H. (1994) [1993]. British Intelligence in the Second World War: Its Influence on Strategy and Operations. History of the Second World War, United Kingdom Military Series (2nd rev. abr. ed.). London: HMSO. ISBN 978-0-11-630961-7.
- Howard, M. (1972). Grand Strategy: August 1942 – September 1943. History of the Second World War United Kingdom Military Series. Vol. IV. London: HMSO. ISBN 978-0-11-630075-1.
- Jordan, Roger W. (2006) [1999]. The World's Merchant Fleets 1939: The Particulars and Wartime Fates of 6,000 Ships (2nd ed.). London: Chatham/Lionel Leventhal. ISBN 978-1-86176-293-1.
- Kahn, D. (1973) [1967]. The Codebreakers: The Story of Secret Writing (10th abr. Signet, Chicago ed.). New York: Macmillan. LCCN 63-16109. OCLC 78083316.
- Llewellyn-Jones, Malcolm (2007). The Royal Navy and the Arctic Convoys: A Naval Staff History (1st ed.). London: Routledge. ISBN 978-0-7146-5284-9.
- Macksey, K. (2004) [2003]. The Searchers: Radio Intercept in two World Wars (repr. Cassell Military Paperbacks ed.). London: Cassell. ISBN 978-0-304-36651-4.
- Mitchell, W. H.; Sawyer, L. A. (1990) [1965]. The Empire Ships: A Record of British-built and acquired Merchant Ships during the Second World War (2nd ed.). London (New York, Hamburg, Hong Kong): Lloyd's of London Press. ISBN 1-85044-275-4.
- Paterson, Lawrence (2016). Steel and Ice: The U-boat Battle in the Arctic and Black Sea 1941–45. Stroud: The History Press. ISBN 978-1-59114-258-4.
- Rohwer, Jürgen; Hümmelchen, Gerhard (2005) [1972]. Chronology of the War at Sea, 1939–1945: The Naval History of World War Two (3rd rev. ed.). London: Chatham. ISBN 978-1-86176-257-3.
- Ruegg, R.; Hague, A. (1993) [1992]. Convoys to Russia: Allied Convoys and Naval Surface Operations in Arctic Waters 1941–1945 (2nd rev. enl. ed.). Kendal: World Ship Society. ISBN 0-905617-66-5.
- Woodman, Richard (1994). Arctic Convoys 1941–1945. London: John Murray. ISBN 978-0-71-955079-9.
- Woodman, Richard (2004) [1994]. Arctic Convoys 1941–1945. London: John Murray. ISBN 978-0-7195-5752-1.
- Ziemke, Earl F. (1959). The German Northern Theatre of Operations 1940–1945. Department of the Army pamphlets (20-271). Washington, DC: Department of the Army. OCLC 467919261.
