= The Shock of the Old =

2006 book by David Edgerton

The Shock of the Old is a book written by the British historian David Edgerton and published in 2006.

In The Shock of the Old, Edgerton points out that invention is not the same as implementation, and when technology is discussed as a historical subject undue emphasis is placed on initial invention, which Edgerton defines as the moment someone first has the idea for a particular device or concept, and innovation, which Edgerton defines as the first use of a particular technology. Edgerton advocates viewing technological history in terms of objects, which have a tangible and personal effect on the lives of individuals, rather than vague concepts of what any particular technology actually is. The book's title alludes to the 1980 television series The Shock of the New.
