= HMS Harrier =

Seven ships of the Royal Navy have borne the name HMS Harrier:

- HMS Harrier (1804), an 18-gun Cruizer-class brig-sloop launched in 1804 and lost around March 1809, presumed foundered off the Île de France.
- HMS Harrier (1813), an 18-gun Cruizer-class brig-sloop launched in 1813, sold in 1829
- HMS Harrier (1831), an 18-gun sloop-of-war launched in 1831, broken up in 1840
- HMS Harrier (1854), a 17-gun wood screw sloop-of-war launched in 1854, broken up in 1866
- HMS Harrier (1881), a two-gun schooner launched in 1881, sold in 1888
- HMS Harrier (1894), a Dryad-class torpedo gunboat launched in 1894, sold in 1920
- HMS Harrier (J71), a Halcyon-class minesweeper launched in 1934, sold in 1950
- HMS Harrier (shore establishment) was also a Royal Naval shore establishment for radar research and training, near Dale, Pembrokeshire. It was commissioned in 1948 and closed in 1961.
