= SS Empire Cowper =

World War II merchant ship of the United Kingdom

History
- Name: Empire Cowper
- Owner: Ministry of War Transport
- Operator: R Chapman & Son
- Port of registry: (United Kingdom) London
- Builder: William Doxford & Sons Ltd
- Yard number: 681
- Launched: 23 September 1941
- Completed: December 1941
- Out of service: 11 April 1942
- Identification: United Kingdom Official Number 169003; Code Letters BCTF
- Fate: Bombed and sunk

General characteristics
- Tonnage: 7,161 GRT; 10,173 DWT
- Length: 428 ft 8 in (130.66 m)
- Beam: 56 ft 5 in (17.20 m)
- Draught: 27 feet 4 3/4 inches (8.350 m)
- Depth: 35 ft 5 in (10.80 m)
- Propulsion: Triple expansion steam engine

Location of the sinking of Empire Cowper.

Empire Cowper was a 7,161 GRT cargo ship that was built in 1941 by William Doxford & Sons Ltd, Sunderland, United Kingdom. She was built for the Ministry of War Transport. Empire Cowper was bombed and sunk on 11 April 1942 whilst a member of Convoy QP 10.

== Description ==
Empire Cowper was built in 1941 by William Doxford & Sons Ltd, Sunderland. Yard number 682, she was launched on 23 September and completed in December,

The ship was 428 feet 8 inches (130.66 m) long, with a beam of 56 feet 5 inches (17.20 m). She had a depth of 35 feet 5 inches (10.80 m) and a draught of 27 feet 4 3/4 inches (8.350 m). She was assessed at 7,164 GRT, 5,053 NRT. Her DWT was 10,173.

The ship was propelled by a 511 nhp triple expansion steam engine, which had cylinders of 23 1/2 inches (60 cm), 37 1/2 inches (95 cm) and 68 inches (170 cm) diameter by 48 inches (120 cm) stroke. The engine was built by John Brown & Co Ltd, Clydebank.

== History ==
Empire Cowper was completed in December 1941, and placed under the management of R Chapman & Son. The Official Number 169003 was allocated, as were the Code Letters BCTF.

Empire Cowper was a member of Convoy PQ 13, which departed Loch Ewe on 10 March 1942 and arrived at Murmansk, Soviet Union on 31 March. She arrived at Reykjavík, Iceland on 16 March and departed on 20 March to join the convoy.

Empire Cowper was a member of Convoy QP 10, which departed the Kola Inlet on 10 April and arrived at Reykjavík on 21 April. On 11 April, she was bombed by Junkers Ju 88 aircraft and sunk in the Barents Sea at 71°01′N 36°00′E, with the loss of nine of her crew. Those lost on Empire Cowper are commemorated at the Tower Hill Memorial, London.
