= SS Francis Scott Key =

Liberty ship of WWII

History

United States
- Name: Francis Scott Key
- Namesake: Francis Scott Key
- Owner: War Shipping Administration (WSA)
- Operator: Lykes Brothers Steamship Company
- Ordered: as type (EC2-S-C1) hull, MCE hull 16
- Awarded: 14 March 1941
- Builder: Bethlehem-Fairfield Shipyard, Baltimore, Maryland
- Cost: $1,470,687
- Yard number: 2003
- Way number: 3
- Laid down: 21 June 1941
- Launched: 15 November 1941
- Completed: 29 January 1942
- Identification: Call sign: KTBH
- Fate: Laid up in the National Defense Reserve Fleet, Astoria, Oregon, 20 October 1949; Sold for scrapping, 14 September 1967, withdrawn from fleet, 29 August 1967

General characteristics
- Class & type: Liberty ship; type EC2-S-C1, standard
- Tonnage: 10,865 LT DWT; 7,176 GRT
- Displacement: 3,380 long tons (3,434 t) (light); 14,245 long tons (14,474 t) (max)
- Length: 441 feet 6 inches (135 m) oa; 416 feet (127 m) pp; 427 feet (130 m) lwl
- Beam: 57 feet (17 m)
- Draft: 27 ft 9.25 in (8.4646 m)
- Installed power: 2 × Oil fired 450 °F (232 °C) boilers, operating at 220 psi (1,500 kPa); 2,500 hp (1,900 kW)
- Propulsion: 1 × triple-expansion steam engine, (manufactured by General Machinery Corp., Hamilton, Ohio); 1 × screw propeller
- Speed: 11.5 knots (21.3 km/h; 13.2 mph)
- Capacity: 562,608 cubic feet (15,931 m^{3}) (grain); 499,573 cubic feet (14,146 m^{3}) (bale)
- Complement: 38–62 USMM; 21–40 USNAG
- Armament: Varied by ship; Bow-mounted 3-inch (76 mm)/50-caliber gun; Stern-mounted 4-inch (102 mm)/50-caliber gun; 2–8 × single 20-millimeter (0.79 in) Oerlikon anti-aircraft (AA) cannons and/or, 2–8 × 37-millimeter (1.46 in) M1 AA guns

SS Francis Scott Key was a Liberty ship built in the United States during World War II. She was named after Francis Scott Key, an American lawyer, author, and amateur poet from Frederick, Maryland, who is best known for writing the lyrics for the American national anthem "The Star-Spangled Banner".

== Construction ==
Francis Scott Key was laid down on 21 June 1941, under a Maritime Commission (MARCOM) contract, MCE hull 16, by the Bethlehem-Fairfield Shipyard, Baltimore, Maryland; and was launched on 15 November 1941.

== History ==
Francis Scott Key was allocated to Lykes Brothers Steamship Company, on 29 January 1942. On 20 October 1949, she was laid up in the National Defense Reserve Fleet, Astoria, Oregon. On 22 June 1954, she was withdrawn from the fleet to be loaded with grain under the "Grain Program 1954", she returned loaded on 9 July 1954. On 14 March 1957, Francis Scott Key was withdrawn to be unload, she returned empty 19 March 1957. She was sold for scrapping on 14 August 1967, to Zidell Explorations, Inc., for $54,001. She was removed from the fleet, 29 August 1967.

== Bibliography ==
- "Bethlehem-Fairfield, Baltimore MD". www.ShipbuildingHistory.com. 14 August 2008.
- Maritime Administration. "Francis Scott Key". Ship History Database Vessel Status Card. U.S. Department of Transportation, Maritime Administration.
- Davies, James (May 2004). "Specifications (As-Built)" (PDF). p. 23.
- "SS Francis Scott Key".
