= HMS Middleton (L74) =

Destroyer of the Royal Navy

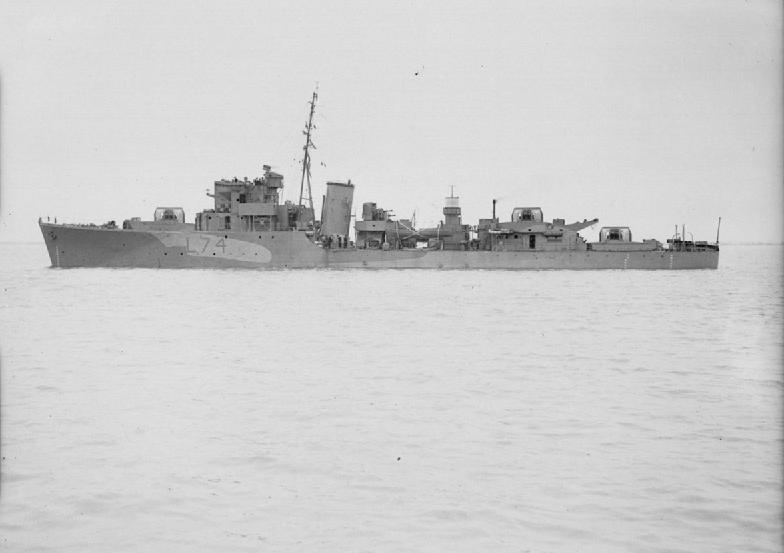
- Middleton in August 1943

History

United Kingdom
- Name: HMS Middleton
- Builder: Vickers-Armstrongs
- Laid down: 10 April 1940
- Launched: 12 May 1941
- Commissioned: 10 January 1943
- Honours and awards: Arctic (1942-43); Malta Convoys (1942); Atlantic (1944); Normandy (1944); English Channel (1944); North Sea (1944-45)
- Fate: Scrapped in February 1958
- Badge: On a Field White, a fret Blue and a hunting horn interlaced Red.

General characteristics
- Class & type: Type II Hunt-class escort destroyer
- Displacement: 1,050 long tons (1,067 t) standard; 1,490 long tons (1,514 t) full load
- Propulsion: 3-drum type boilers, driving two shafts, generating 19000 shp
- Speed: 27 knots
- Complement: 168
- Armament: 6 × 4-inch guns; 4 × 2-pdr pompom; 2 × 20 mm anti-aircraft guns

HMS Middleton was a Type II Hunt class destroyer of the Royal Navy and served in the Second World War. Her role was providing support for minelaying operations in the Atlantic and anti-aircraft protection for the North Russian convoys. At the end of the Second World War, Middleton returned to Portsmouth having achieved no less than six battle honours during her brief four years of active service. She remained in reserve until 1955 and was broken up in February 1958.

== Construction ==
On 4 September 1939, Middleton was ordered as part of the 1939 War Emergency Programme. She was laid down in April 1940 and launched in May the following year. The ship was completed on 10 January 1943, by which time she had seen action in the North Sea and the Mediterranean Sea as a convoy escort. She was the first to carry the name Middleton, in honour of the Yorkshire fox-hunt, although there was already a ship called Lord Middleton.

== Career ==
=== Second World War ===
Although launched in May 1941, her first service was in early 1942 when she escorted convoys PQ 6 and PQ 11 to Iceland. After more refits, she was assigned to the 17th Destroyer Flotilla, based at Scapa Flow. In March 1942, she was deployed as part of a heavy escort for the convoys PQ 13 and the return convoy QP 9. The escort included the battleships King George V and Duke of York, as well as aircraft carrier Victorious. The massive escort was required to deter the German battleship Tirpitz, the pocket battleship Admiral Scheer and the heavy cruiser Admiral Hipper, all of which were in the area hunting convoys to the USSR.

In April, she was deployed for the aborted Operation Myrmidon. After the operation was cancelled she joined another heavy escort, led by the same three ships, for convoy PQ 14 and QP 10. Later in April, she was yet again deployed in such a rôle, for convoys PQ 15 and QP 11. However, this time PQ 15 was also escorted by the battleship USS Washington of the United States Navy, which had been deployed to British waters after many Royal Navy capital ships had been lost.

After escorting many Arctic convoys, she was deployed as an escort for convoys to the besieged Mediterranean island of Malta. On 14 June, she came under heavy air attack by Italian torpedo bombers. The light cruiser Liverpool was hit in the attack and put out of action for the rest of the war. However, she was taken in tow and, escorted by Middleton, made it successfully to Gibraltar where repairs began.

In July, she was once again protecting the Arctic convoys from German attack and on 4 July, the convoy PQ 17 was forced to scatter because of the threat caused by the German ships Tirpitz, Admiral Scheer and Lützow. In late July, she remained in North Russia and operated from Murmansk throughout August. She returned to Scapa Flow in late September and was then deployed on convoy escort duty between the United Kingdom and Ireland.

In early 1943, after a refit, she was assigned to escort convoy JW 53 through appalling weather. The visibility was so poor that it was rarely clear how many ships were keeping up with the convoy, and communication was also affected. Many ships were forced to retreat, including Lord Middleton and Sheffield. Middleton herself was forced to leave the convoy because of a lack of fuel, and went to Iceland, but by that time extra escorts had arrived. The convoy survived the bad weather, which started to clear after Middleton left, and German attack to reach Russia.

She remained in a convoy escort rôle throughout 1943 and into 1944. But in May 1944 she was nominated to be part of the Eastern Task Force to support the Normandy Landings. She patrolled a part of the channel before the operation and then, on 6 June with ORP Ślązak, supplied covering fire to the troops assaulting Sword. She supplied gunfire support over the next two and a half weeks as well, but her main rôle immediately post-invasion was to patrol the channel and protect the convoys from U-boats and E-boats. She wasn't really threatened until she came under fire from shore batteries on Cap Gris Nez three months after the invasion. She was transferred to Sheerness that very day as German naval activity in the area of Nore Command was taking advantage of the Allied concentration of troops and boats elsewhere. She was deployed in a convoy defence capacity in or near the English Channel for the next few months. German mine-laying and U-boat activity was greatly increased in early 1945 and destroyers were needed to escort the military convoys from channel ports.

=== Post War ===
In mid 1945, after the surrender of Nazi Germany, Middleton was assigned to Simonstown in South Africa. Most of the time there, she was under refit which was completed in December 1945.

She returned to the United Kingdom soon after the refit was completed and was reduced to reserve status in Portsmouth. In 1954, still on the reserve list, she was temporarily stationed at Gibraltar. In 1956, she returned to the UK where she was placed on the disposal list. She arrived at Hughes Bolckow for breaking-up on 4 October 1957, she was finally broken up by February 1958.

The ship's bell is preserved in the Parish church in Birdsall, North Yorkshire.

== Publications ==
- Colledge, J. J.; Warlow, Ben (2006) [1969]. Ships of the Royal Navy: The Complete Record of All Fighting Ships of the Royal Navy from the 15th Century to the Present (3rd Rev ed.). London: Chatham Publishing. ISBN 978-1-86176-281-8. OCLC 67375475.
