= SS West Gotomska =

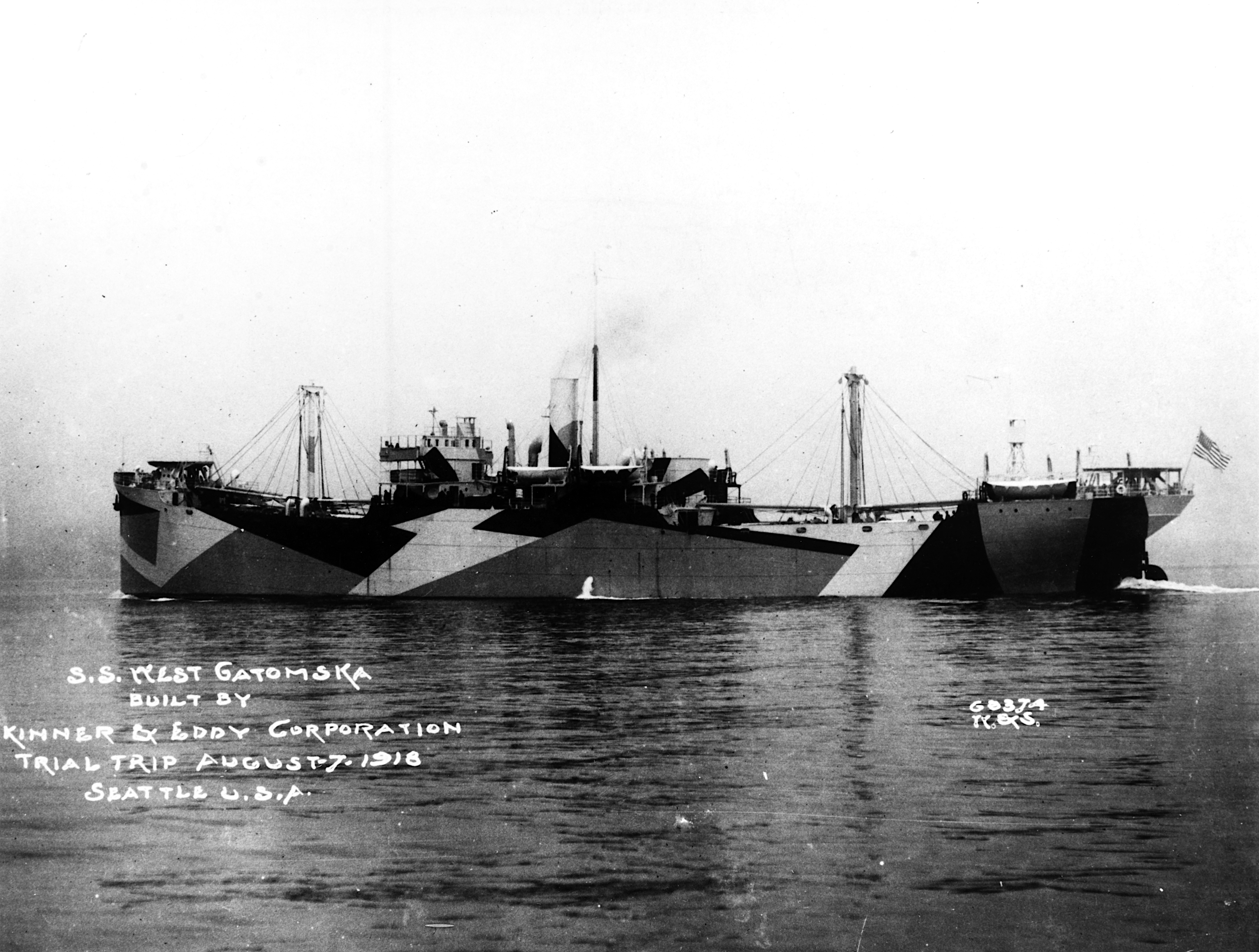
- SS West Gotomska in dazzle camouflage paint, undergoing trials on 7 August 1918

History
- Name: SS West Gotomska
- Owner: U.S. Shipping Board
- Builder: Skinner & Eddy
- Yard number: 27 (USSB #1180)
- Laid down: 16 May 1918
- Launched: 17 July 1918
- Acquired: 7 August 1918
- Commissioned: 7 August 1918 – 6 June 1919
- In service: 7 August 1918–1948?
- Renamed: USS West Gotomska (ID-3322) 1918; West Gotomska 1919; Andalien 1943
- Fate: Scrapped at Philadelphia, 1948

General characteristics
- Type: Design 1013 cargo ship
- Tonnage: 5,600 gross, 8,800 dwt
- Displacement: 12,225 tons
- Length: 423 ft 9 in (129.16 m); 410 ft 5 in (125.10 m) bp
- Beam: 54 ft (16 m)
- Draft: 24 ft 2 in (7.37 m)
- Depth of hold: 29 ft 9 in (9.07 m)
- Installed power: 1 × Curtis geared turbine
- Propulsion: Single propeller
- Speed: 11.5 kn (21.3 km/h)
- Complement: World War I: (USN): 70; Peacetime: about 30; World War II: unknown
- Armament: World War I: 1 × 5"/51 cal., 1 × 3"/50 cal.; World War II: unknown

SS West Gotomska was a steel–hulled cargo ship built in 1918 as part of the World War I emergency wartime shipbuilding program organized by the United States Shipping Board.

West Gotomska was commissioned straight into the U.S. Navy on completion in August 1918 as the auxiliary ship USS West Gotomska (ID-3322), and subsequently completed several supply missions on the Navy's behalf before decommissioning in June 1919. Between the wars, she was placed into commercial service as SS West Gotomska.

With America's entry into World War II in December 1941, West Gotomska participated in the convoy system that kept open the vital supply lines to Britain and the Soviet Union during the Battle of the Atlantic. In 1942, West Gotomska became one of the few survivors of the disastrous Convoy PQ 17 to Russia.

In 1943, the ageing vessel was sold to Chilean interests, who renamed her SS Andalien. Andalien was scrapped in Philadelphia in 1948.

== Construction and design ==
West Gotomska was built in Seattle, Washington in 1918 at the No. 1 Plant of the Skinner & Eddy Corporation—the 12th in a series of 24 Design 1013 cargo ships built by Skinner & Eddy for the USSB's emergency wartime shipbuilding program. The ship was laid down on May 16, launched 51 working (62 calendar) days later on 17 July, and completed on 7 August—a total time under construction of 68 working (83 calendar) days, putting West Gotomska amongst the fastest-built ships of her time.

West Gotomska had a design deadweight tonnage of 8,800 tons and gross register tonnage of 5,600. She had an overall length of 423 feet 9 inches, a beam of 54 feet and a draft of 24 feet 2 inches. The ship was powered by a Curtis geared turbine, driving a single screw propeller and delivering a speed of 11 knots.

== Service history ==
=== U.S. Navy service, 1918–1919 ===
West Gotomska was delivered at Seattle on 7 August 1918 and commissioned into the Navy the same day, as USS West Gotomska (ID-3322) for operation with the Naval Overseas Transportation Service (NOTS).

USS West Gotomska commenced her first voyage for the Navy on 17 August when she sailed for Arica, Chile to load a cargo of guano bound for New Orleans, Louisiana. Making port at New Orleans on 11 October, the ship discharged her cargo of nitrates and then took aboard a full cargo of Army supplies earmarked for U.S. troops in France. Departing for France on 10 November—the day before Armistice Day—West Gotomska arrived at Quiberon Bay, France on the 25th where she unloaded her cargo. She then took aboard 2,100 tons of Army return cargo and departed on 22 December for Norfolk, Virginia, arriving 6 January.

Having unloaded her cargo at Norfolk, West Gotomska shipped 5,182 tons of fuel oil and sailed on the 25th for La Pallice, France. The ship then conducted a second run to La Pallice with Army cargo before returning, via the Azores and Philadelphia, to Hampton Roads, Virginia. She was decommissioned and struck from the Navy List on 6 June 1919.

=== Interwar years ===
Following her decommission, West Gotomska was returned to control of the USSB, which placed her into merchant service as SS West Gotomska. Through the 1920s, West Gotomska was employed in Transatlantic and Mediterranean service, operating between U.S. ports such as New York and Baltimore and various European and Near Eastern destinations including Marseille, France; Manchester, England; Salonika, Greece and Oran, Algeria. There is no record in readily available sources of West Gotomska's movements in the 1930s, and it may be that, like many other ships in this period, she was laid up through lack of work due to the onset of the Great Depression in 1929-30.

=== World War II ===
In early 1941, at the height of the Battle of the Atlantic, the Irish government decided to establish its own neutral merchant marine. The government purchased three secondhand freighters for the purpose, Leda, a 4,100-ton vessel, and two ships owned by the U.S. Maritime Commission (the successor to the USSB), West Neris and West Gotomska. The two U.S. ships underwent a thorough recondition for the sale, and were slated for carrying a cargo of wheat gifted to Ireland by the U.S. government after an Irish crop failure. However, after Leda temporarily went missing on her maiden voyage under the Irish flag, the sale of West Gotomska appears to have been cancelled, as the ship remained under U.S. ownership.

By early 1942, West Gotomska had become part of the North Atlantic convoy system, established to keep open the vital supply lanes between the United States and her wartime allies Britain and the Soviet Union. On 18 March 1942, West Gotomska sailed from Halifax, Nova Scotia in Convoy SC 75 with a cargo of general goods bound for Liverpool, England, arriving at her destination 3 April. The next few voyages undertaken by the vessel would be made with the hazardous Russia-bound convoys.

==== Russian convoys ====
On 26 March, West Gotomska departed Oban, Scotland with Convoy PQ-14, bound for Murmansk, Russia. After suffering ice damage en route however, she was diverted to Convoy QP 10, which was returning from Russia to Reykjavík, Iceland. Arriving at Reykjavík 21 April, West Gotomska put in for repairs.

On June 27, West Gotomska set out from Reykjavík bound for Russia once more, this time with Convoy PQ 17. On July 4, the convoy received an order from the British Admiralty to disperse, as German capital ships were thought to be on course to intercept. This order would have disastrous results, as the dispersed vessels became easy pickings for German U-boats and aircraft. Of the 33 ships in the convoy, only nine would make it through to their destination, the other 24 being lost to enemy action. West Gotomska was one of the lucky few to survive the voyage.

By November, West Gotomska was back in Britain, preparing for another voyage to Russia with Convoy JW 51A. The convoy departed Loch Ewe on 15 December, arriving at Kola Inlet, Russia on Christmas Day. With 10 passengers and a return cargo of timber, West Gotomska departed Kola Inlet for Loch Ewe with Convoy RA 53 on 1 March, arriving safely at Loch Ewe once again on the 14th.

==== Return to the Americas ====
On 24 March 1943, West Gotomska set out from Liverpool bound for New York City with Convoy ON 175. However, the ship straggled, and was diverted to Iceland instead, arriving on the 31st. On 19 April, West Gotomska joined a slower convoy, ONS 4, to complete the crossing, arriving at Halifax, Nova Scotia on 5 May, and from there making her way to Boston and New York. From New York, she proceeded on 11 June to Guantanamo, Cuba, arriving on the 18th. Diverted to Galveston via Key West, Florida in late June, she retraced the same route to arrive once more at Guantanamo in August.

West Gotomska was subsequently chartered to Cia Sud Americana of Chile and renamed SS Andalien. Her movements after this point are unknown, but she remained under charter to the Chilean firm until 1947, and was scrapped by Northern Metals of Philadelphia in 1948.

== Bibliography ==
- Hurley, Edward N. (1920): The New Merchant Marine, p. 39, The Century Co., New York.
- Pacific Ports Inc. (1919): Pacific Ports Annual, Fifth Edition, 1919, pp. 64–65, 402–405, Pacific Ports Inc.
- Silverstone, Paul H. (2006): The New Navy, 1883-1922, Routledge, ISBN 978-0-415-97871-2.
