= HMS Harrier (1831) =

Sloop of the Royal Navy

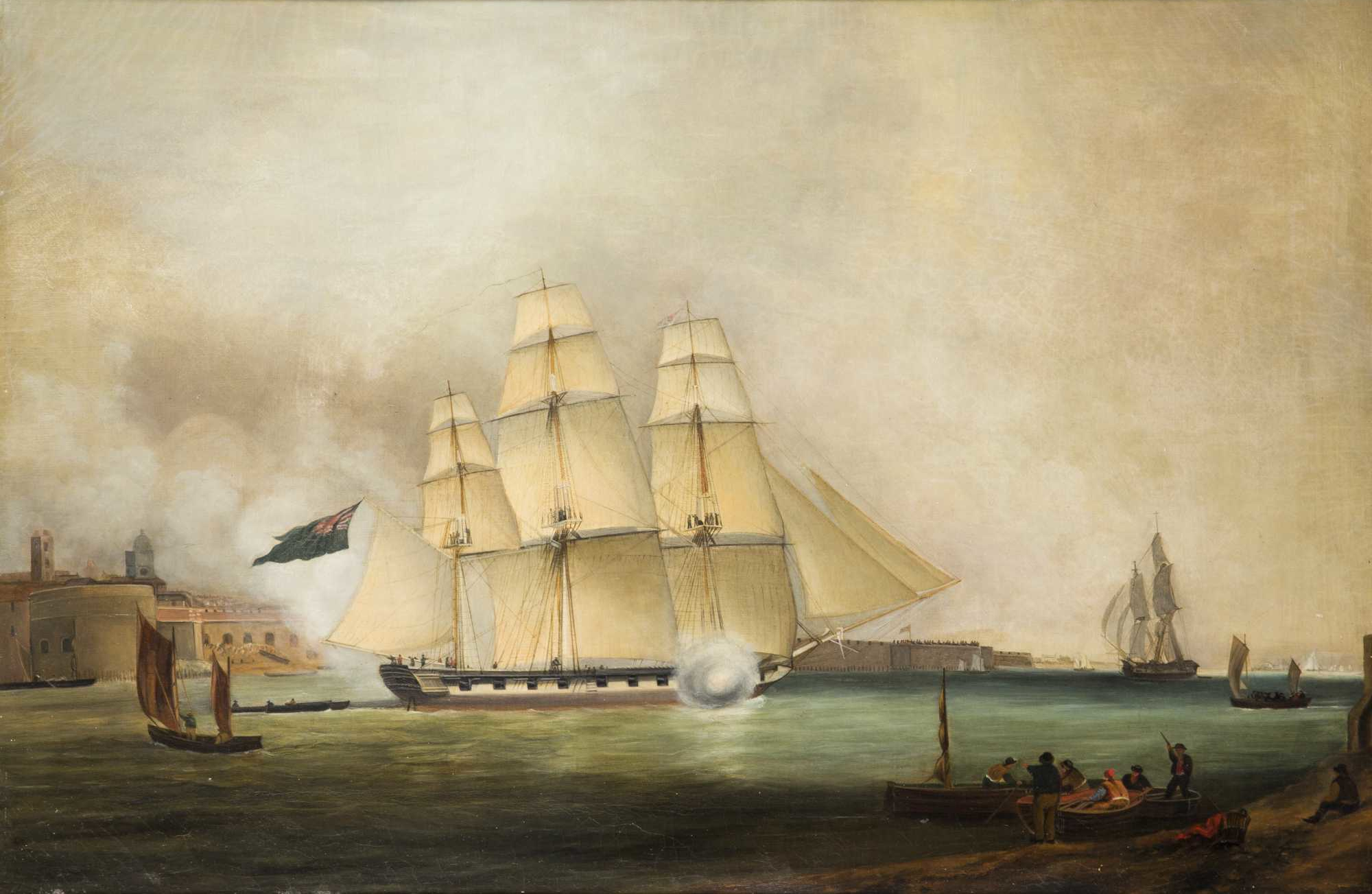
- HMS Harrier

History

United Kingdom
- Name: Harrier
- Ordered: 30 January 1829
- Builder: Pembroke Dockyard
- Laid down: November 1830
- Launched: 8 November 1831
- Completed: 25 March 1832
- Commissioned: 24 November 1831
- Fate: Broken up, March 1840

General characteristics
- Class & type: Fly-class sloop
- Tons burthen: 485 69/94 bm
- Length: 114 ft 4 in (34.8 m) (gundeck); 93 ft 6 in (28.5 m) (keel)
- Beam: 31 ft 7 in (9.6 m)
- Draught: 11 ft 9 in (3.6 m)
- Depth: 8 ft 3 in (2.5 m)
- Complement: 120
- Armament: 2 × 9-pdr cannon; 16 × 32-pdr carronades

HMS Harrier was an 18-gun Fly-class sloop, built for the Royal Navy during the 1830s.

== Description ==
Harrier had a length at the gundeck of 114 feet 4 inches (34.8 m) and 93 feet 6 inches (28.5 m) at the keel. She had a beam of 31 feet 3 inches (9.5 m), a draught of 11 feet 9 inches (3.6 m) and a depth of hold of 8 feet 3 inches (2.5 m). The ship's tonnage was 48569/94 tons burthen. The Fly class was armed with a pair of 9-pounder cannon in the bow and sixteen 32-pounder carronades. The ships had a crew of 120 officers and ratings.

== Construction and career ==
Harrier, the third ship of her name to serve in the Royal Navy, was ordered on 30 January 1829, laid down in November 1830 at Pembroke Dockyard, Wales, and launched on 8 November 1831. She was completed on 25 March 1832 at Plymouth Dockyard and commissioned on 24 November 1831.

Plan showing a part stern elevation and plan illustrating the fitting of an iron tiller to Harrier
