= Soviet submarine K-3 =

Soviet submarine K-3 may refer to one of the following submarines of the Soviet Navy:

- Soviet submarine K-3 (1938), a K-class submarine sunk by German vessels in March 1943
- Soviet submarine K-3 Leninsky Komsomol, a November-class (or Project 627) submarine; the first nuclear submarine of the Soviet Union which suffered a fire in the Mediterranean in September 1967, now on display in Kronstadt
