= David Edgerton (historian) =

British historian

David Edgerton FBA (born 16 April 1959) is an English economic historian and educator. He was educated at St John's College, Oxford, and Imperial College London. After teaching the economics of science and technology and the history of science and technology at the University of Manchester, he became the founding director of the Centre for the History of Science, Technology and Medicine at Imperial College, London, and Hans Rausing Professor. He has held a Major Research Fellowship (2006–2009) from the Leverhulme Trust. In 2013, he led the move of the Centre for the History of Science, Technology and Medicine to the Department of History of King's College London. Edgerton's books include Warfare State: Britain 1920–1970 (Cambridge, 2005) and The Shock of the Old: Technology and Global History since 1900 (Profile, 2006). Edgerton was elected a fellow of the British Academy in 2021.

== Selected publications ==
David Edgerton has published articles and several books, including:

- The Rise and Fall of the British Nation: A Twentieth-Century History (2018) ISBN 978-1-8461-4775-3
- Britain's War Machine: Weapons, Resources and Experts in the Second World War (2011) ISBN 978-0-7139-9918-1
- Warfare State: Britain 1920–1970 (Cambridge, 2005); ISBN 978-0-521-67231-3
- The Shock of the Old: Technology and Global History since 1900 (Profile, 2006) ISBN 978-1-86197-306-1
- Science, Technology and the British Industrial 'Decline' 1870–1970 (CUP, 1996) ISBN 978-0-521-57778-6
- England and the Aeroplane: An Essay on a Militant and Technological Nation (Science, Technology and Medicine in Modern History) (1991) ISBN 978-0-333-56921-4
