= HMT Lord Middleton =

History

United Kingdom
- Name: HM Trawler Lord Middleton
- Operator: Royal Navy
- Builder: Cochrane & Sons Shipbuilders Ltd, Selby, England
- Launched: 24 March 1936
- Commissioned: September 1939 (requisitioned)
- Decommissioned: July 1945
- Fate: Scrapped in 1964
- Displacement: 464 tons
- Length: 161.3-foot (49.2 m)
- Beam: 26.6-foot (8.1 m)
- Draught: 14.1-foot (4.3 m)
- Propulsion: 3 cylinder steam engine
- Armament: 1 × 4-inch gun

This ship was originally a fishing trawler launched on 24 March 1936 by Cochrane & sons, Ltd, Selby, England for Pickering & Haldane's Steam Trawling Company, Ltd, Hull, England. She fished out of Hull 1936-1939. She was requisitioned by the Royal Navy upon the outbreak of the Second World War in September, 1939 and designated HMT Lord Middleton with the pennant number (FY219) as an Anti-submarine Naval trawler.

== Service in the Second World War ==
In April 1942, she participated in the Murmansk convoys PQ-14, QP-11, and PQ-17. On 19 April Lord Middelton rescued 9 crew, including the Master, from the torpedoed merchantman Empire Howard northwest of North Cape. On 1 May 1942 she also rescued 14 of the crew of the Soviet ship Tsiolkovskij after that vessel was eventually sunk by attacks from a German U-boat and two destroyers 150 miles off Bear Island.

On 20 September 1942, Lord Middleton was part of Convoy PQ 18 which was attacked by U-703. During the battle, HMS Somali (F33) was hit and sustained major damage. Lord Middleton evacuated 80 of her 190-strong crew, leaving some of them to try to save the ship. When the ship eventually broke in two and sank five days later, Lord Middleton and HMS Ashanti (F51) pulled 35 more of her crew from the sea.

On 17 February 1943, as part of the Arctic convoy JW 53 to the Soviet port of Murmansk, HMT Lord Middleton suffered flooding in her forward storeroom in the bad weather and was lagging behind the convoy. She was forced to retreat to Scapa Flow escorted by the corvette HMS Dianella.

She performed convoy escort during Operation Neptune.

== Post WWII use ==
She survived the war and was returned to her owner on 18 March, 1946. She was sold to Associated Fisheries Trawling Company Ltd 17 April 1950. Sold to Wyre Trawlers Ltd 28 August 1962. On 14 November 1962 arrested for illegal fishing off Iceland. She was sold for scrapping in May, 1964. Delivered to Barrow-in-Furness for scrapping 14 May 1964 under her own power. The ship features in a song written by Alan Bell of The Taverners Folk Group: "So spare to her a kindly glance if e'er you're passing by, for over there in the old scrapyard the Lord Middleton must die".
