= German submarine U-403 =

German World War II submarine

History

Nazi Germany
- Name: U-403
- Ordered: 23 September 1939
- Builder: Danziger Werft, Danzig
- Yard number: 104
- Laid down: 20 May 1940
- Launched: 26 February 1941
- Commissioned: 25 June 1941
- Fate: Sunk on 18 August 1943, west of Dakar

General characteristics
- Class & type: Type VIIC submarine
- Displacement: 769 tonnes (757 long tons) surfaced; 871 t (857 long tons) submerged
- Length: 67.10 m (220 ft 2 in) o/a; 50.50 m (165 ft 8 in) pressure hull
- Beam: 6.20 m (20 ft 4 in) o/a; 4.70 m (15 ft 5 in) pressure hull
- Height: 9.60 m (31 ft 6 in)
- Draught: 4.74 m (15 ft 7 in)
- Installed power: 2,800–3,200 PS (2,100–2,400 kW; 2,800–3,200 bhp) (diesels); 750 PS (550 kW; 740 shp) (electric)
- Propulsion: 2 shafts; 2 × diesel engines; 2 × electric motors.
- Speed: 17.7 knots (32.8 km/h; 20.4 mph) surfaced; 7.6 knots (14.1 km/h; 8.7 mph) submerged
- Range: 8,500 nmi (15,700 km; 9,800 mi) at 10 knots (19 km/h; 12 mph) surfaced; 80 nmi (150 km; 92 mi) at 4 knots (7.4 km/h; 4.6 mph) submerged
- Test depth: 230 m (750 ft); Crush depth: 250–295 m (820–968 ft)
- Complement: 4 officers, 40–56 enlisted
- Armament: 5 × 53.3 cm (21 in) torpedo tubes (four bow, one stern); 14 × torpedoes or 26 TMA mines; 1 × 8.8 cm (3.46 in) deck gun (220 rounds); 1 x 2 cm (0.79 in) C/30 AA gun

Service record
- Part of: 5th U-boat Flotilla; 25 June – 31 August 1941; 7th U-boat Flotilla; 1 September – 30 June 1942; 11th U-boat Flotilla; 1 July 1942 – 28 February 1943; 9th U-boat Flotilla; 1 March – 18 August 1943
- Identification codes: M 43 616
- Commanders: Kptlt. Heinz-Ehlert Clausen; 25 June 1941 – 15 June 1943; Kptlt. Karl-Franz Heine; 16 June – 18 August 1943
- Operations: 8 patrols: 1st patrol: a. 1 – 19 March 1942; b. 23 March 1942; 2nd patrol: a. 4 – 21 April 1943; b. 10 – 13 May 1943; 3rd patrol: 17 – 28 July 1942; 4th patrol: 2 – 20 August 1942; 5th patrol: a. 26 August – 21 September 1942; b. 24 – 26 September 1942; 6th patrol: 9 January – 2 March 1943; 7th patrol: 19 April – 31 May 1943; 8th patrol: 13 July – 18 August 1943
- Victories: 2 merchant ships sunk (12,946 GRT)

German submarine U-403 was a Type VIIC U-boat of Nazi Germany's Kriegsmarine during World War II.

In eight war patrols, she sank two ships totalling 12,946 gross register tons (GRT). She was sunk by a French aircraft west of Dakar on 18 August 1943 with the loss of all hands.

== Design ==
German Type VIIC submarines were preceded by the shorter Type VIIB submarines. U-403 had a displacement of 769 tonnes (757 long tons) when at the surface and 871 tonnes (857 long tons) while submerged. She had a total length of 67.10 m (220 ft 2 in), a pressure hull length of 50.50 m (165 ft 8 in), a beam of 6.20 m (20 ft 4 in), a height of 9.60 m (31 ft 6 in), and a draught of 4.74 m (15 ft 7 in). The submarine was powered by two Germaniawerft F46 four-stroke, six-cylinder supercharged diesel engines producing a total of 2,800 to 3,200 metric horsepower (2,060 to 2,350 kW; 2,760 to 3,160 shp) for use while surfaced, two Siemens-Schuckert GU 343/38–8 double-acting electric motors producing a total of 750 metric horsepower (550 kW; 740 shp) for use while submerged. She had two shafts and two 1.23 m (4 ft) propellers. The boat was capable of operating at depths of up to 230 metres (750 ft).

The submarine had a maximum surface speed of 17.7 knots (32.8 km/h; 20.4 mph) and a maximum submerged speed of 7.6 knots (14.1 km/h; 8.7 mph). When submerged, the boat could operate for 80 nautical miles (150 km; 92 mi) at 4 knots (7.4 km/h; 4.6 mph); when surfaced, she could travel 8,500 nautical miles (15,700 km; 9,800 mi) at 10 knots (19 km/h; 12 mph). U-403 was fitted with five 53.3 cm (21 in) torpedo tubes (four fitted at the bow and one at the stern), fourteen torpedoes, one 8.8 cm (3.46 in) SK C/35 naval gun, 220 rounds, and a 2 cm (0.79 in) C/30 anti-aircraft gun. The boat had a complement of between forty-four and sixty.

== Service history ==
The submarine was laid down on 20 May 1940 at the Danziger Werft at Danzig (now Gdansk, Poland) as yard number 15, launched on 26 February 1941 and commissioned on 25 June under the command of Kapitänleutnant Heinz-Ehlert Clausen.

She served with the 5th U-boat Flotilla from 25 June 1941 for training and the 7th flotilla from 1 September for operations. She was reassigned to the 11th flotilla on 1 July 1942, then the 9th flotilla on 1 March 1943.

=== First patrol ===
U-359's first patrol was preceded by a move from Kiel to the German-administered island of Helgoland, (sometimes written as 'Heligoland'), on 26 February 1942. She left there on 1 March, sailing through the Norwegian Sea. She sailed as far as the Barents Sea before docking in Narvik on the 19th.

=== Second patrol ===
She moved to Harstad (northwest of Narvik), on 21 April 1942, before setting out on her second foray when she sank the Empire Howard southeast of Bear Island on the 16th. The ship went down in fifty-seven seconds.

=== Third and fourth patrols ===
Having berthed in Skjomenfjord (south of Narvik) on 27 July 1942, the boat departed on her fourth sortie on 2 April. Her route took her through the Norwegian, Greenland and Barents Seas. She returned to Skjomenfjord on 20 August.

=== Fifth and sixth patrols ===
The submarine's fifth patrol terminated in Narvik on 21 September 1942. She moved to Trondheim on the 26th.

Patrol number six started from Trondheim on 9 January 1943. The boat passed through the gap between Iceland and the Faroe Islands and headed for southeast Greenland. She then turned south and was attacked by a Canso (the Canadian version of the Catalina flying boat) off the Newfoundland coast on 6 February. Moderate damage was sustained. She subsequently sank the Greek-registered Zeus on the 19th.

=== Seventh and eighth patrols and loss ===
U-403 was unsuccessfully attacked by a Fairey Swordfish of 811 Naval Air Squadron from HMS Biter on 10 May 1943 northwest of the Azores on her seventh patrol.

The submarine was on the surface accompanied by U-43 on 30 July 1943, when they were attacked by Avenger and Wildcat aircraft from the American escort carrier USS Santee. U-403 escaped, U-43 was not so lucky; she was sunk.

The boat was sunk by depth charges dropped by a Vickers Wellington of No. 344 Squadron RAF (with a French crew), on 18 August 1943 near Dakar on the west African coast, with the loss of all 49 crewmen.

=== Previously recorded fate ===
U-403 was originally noted as sunk, also on 18 August 1943, by a British Lockheed Hudson of 200 Squadron near Dakar.

=== Wolfpacks ===
U-403 took part in twelve wolfpacks, namely:

- Aufnahme (7 – 11 March 1942)
- Blücher (11 – 18 March 1942)
- Bums (6 – 14 April 1942)
- Blutrausch (15 – 18 April 1942)
- Nebelkönig (7 – 14 August 1942)
- Trägertod (12 – 19 September 1942)
- Falke (15 – 19 January 1943)
- Haudegen (19 January – 15 February 1943)
- Taifun (15 – 20 February 1943)
- Amsel (26 April – 3 May 1943)
- Amsel 4 (3 – 6 May 1943)
- Rhein (7 – 10 May 1943)

== Summary of raiding history ==
Date	Ship Name	Nationality	Tonnage (GRT)	Fate
16 April 1942	Empire Howard	United Kingdom	6,985	Sunk
19 February 1943	Zeus	Greece	5,961	Sunk

== Bibliography ==
- Busch, Rainer; Röll, Hans-Joachim (1999). German U-boat commanders of World War II : a biographical dictionary. Translated by Brooks, Geoffrey. London, Annapolis, Md: Greenhill Books, Naval Institute Press. ISBN 1-55750-186-6.
- Busch, Rainer; Röll, Hans-Joachim (1999). Deutsche U-Boot-Verluste von September 1939 bis Mai 1945 [German U-boat losses from September 1939 to May 1945]. Der U-Boot-Krieg (in German). Vol. IV. Hamburg, Berlin, Bonn: Mittler. ISBN 3-8132-0514-2.
- Edwards, Bernard (1996). Dönitz and the Wolf Packs – The U-boats at War. Cassell Military Classics. pp. 152, 206, 209. ISBN 0-304-35203-9.
- Gröner, Erich; Jung, Dieter; Maass, Martin (1991). U-boats and Mine Warfare Vessels. German Warships 1815–1945. Vol. 2. Translated by Thomas, Keith; Magowan, Rachel. London: Conway Maritime Press. ISBN 0-85177-593-4.
- Kemp, Paul (1999). U-Boats Destroyed – German Submarine Losses in the World Wars. London: Arms & Armour. ISBN 1-85409-515-3.
