= Soviet submarine S-101 =

1938–1956 S-class submarine of the Soviet Navy

- design of the class

History

Soviet Union
- Name: S-101
- Laid down: 20 June 1937
- Launched: 20 April 1938
- Commissioned: 15 December 1940
- Decommissioned: 17 February 1956
- Fate: Scrapped in 1957

General characteristics
- Class & type: Soviet S-class submarine
- Displacement: 840 long tons (853 t) surfaced; 1,050 long tons (1,067 t) submerged
- Length: 77.8 m (255 ft 3 in)
- Beam: 6.4 m (21 ft 0 in)
- Draught: 4.4 m (14 ft 5 in)
- Propulsion: 2 × diesels 2,000 hp (1,491 kW) each; 2 × electric motors 550 hp (410 kW) each; 2 × shafts
- Speed: 19.5 knots (36.1 km/h; 22.4 mph) surfaced; 9 knots (17 km/h; 10 mph) submerged
- Test depth: 100 m (330 ft)
- Complement: 50 officers and men
- Armament: 6 × 21 in (530 mm) torpedo tubes (4 forward, 2 aft); 12 × torpedoes; 1 × 100 mm (4 in) gun; 1 × 45 mm (2 in) cannon

S-101 was an S-class submarine of the Soviet Navy. Her keel was laid down in Gorkiy on 20 June 1937. She was launched on 20 April 1938 and commissioned on 15 December 1940 in the Northern Fleet.

== Service history ==
S-101 served in Northern Fleet; the most notable success of this boat was the torpedoing and sinking of German U-boat U-639 in the Kara Sea. S-101 was awarded with Order of the Red Banner because of the success.

Ships sunk by S-101
Date	Ship	Flag	Tonnage	Notes
29 March 1943	Ajax	(Nazi Germany)	2297 GRT	freighter (torpedo)
28 August 1943	U-639	(Nazi Germany)	769 GRT	submarine (torpedo)
Total:			3066 GRT	

== Bibliography ==
- Budzbon, Przemysław (1980). "Soviet Union". In Chesneau, Roger (ed.). Conway's All the World's Fighting Ships 1922–1946. Conway Maritime Press. pp. 318–346. ISBN 0-85177-146-7.
- Budzbon, Przemysław; Radziemski, Jan & Twardowski, Marek (2022). Warships of the Soviet Fleets 1939–1945. Vol. I: Major Combatants. Naval Institute Press. ISBN 978-1-68247-877-6.
- Polmar, Norman & Noot, Jurrien (1991). Submarines of the Russian and Soviet Navies, 1718–1990. Naval Institute Press. ISBN 0-87021-570-1.
- Rohwer, Jürgen (2005). Chronology of the War at Sea 1939–1945: The Naval History of World War Two (Third Revised ed.). Naval Institute Press. ISBN 1-59114-119-2.
