= Convoy QP 9 =

Artic convoy of the Second World War

- Part of Arctic Convoys of the Second World War
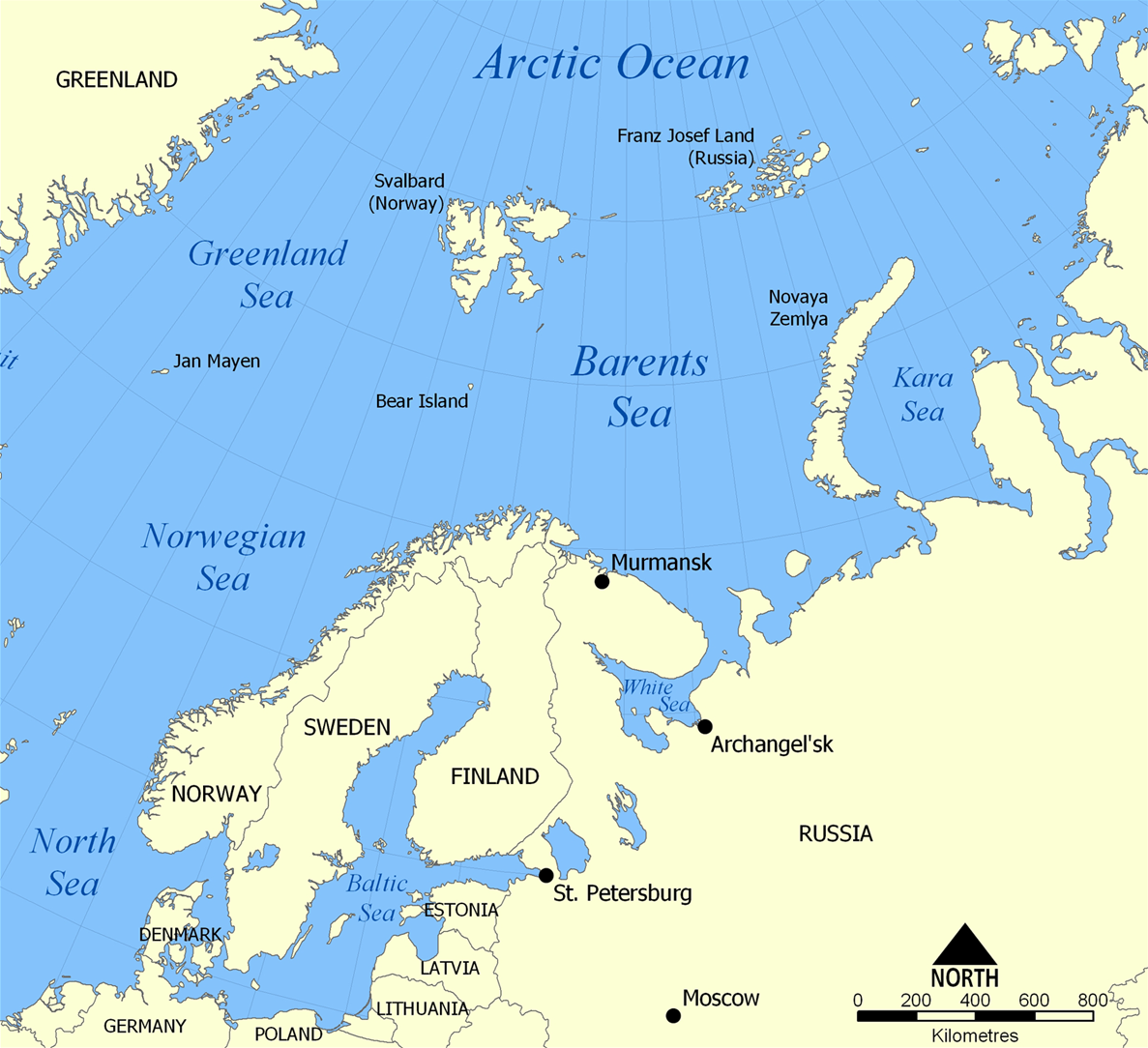
- The Norwegian and the Barents seas, site of the Arctic convoys
Date	21 March – 3 April 1942
Location	Arctic Ocean

Belligerents
Royal Navy; Merchant Navy; Panama; Soviet Union	Luftwaffe; Kriegsmarine

Commanders and leaders
Convoy Commodore: Hubert Hudson; Escorts: David Lampen; Robert Ewing	Hans-Jürgen Stumpff; Hermann Böhm

Strength
Merchant ships: 18; Escorts: 10 (in relays)	4 U-boats

Casualties and losses
Nil	U-655 sunk

Convoy QP 9 (21 March – 3 April 1942) departed Murmansk with 18 merchant ships. The distant escort by the cruiser HMS Kenya was intended to cover the convoy from 22 to 27 March but it was unable to rendezvous with the convoy. The ocean escort was the destroyer HMS Offa and the minesweepers HMS Britomart and Sharpshooter.

The ocean escort Sharpshooter rammed and sank the U-boat U-655, one of four operating against the convoy. Sharpshooter was damaged, handed over the convoy to Offa and made an independent voyage to Iceland. The remaining escorts brought the convoy to Reykjavík in Iceland without further incident.

== Background ==
=== Lend-lease ===
The Soviet leaders needed to replace the colossal losses of military equipment after the Operation Barbarossa the German invasion, especially when Soviet war industries were being moved out of the war zone and emphasised tank and aircraft deliveries. Machine tools, steel and aluminium were also needed to replace indigenous resources lost in the invasion. The pressure on the civilian sector of the economy needed to be limited by food deliveries. The Soviets wanted to concentrate their remaining resources on items that the Soviet war economy had the greatest comparative advantage over the German economy. Aluminium imports allowed aircraft production to a far greater extent than would have been possible using local sources and tank production was emphasised at the expense of lorries; food supplies were squeezed by reliance on what could be obtained from lend–lease. At the Moscow Conference, it was acknowledged that 1.5 million tons of shipping was needed to transport the supplies of the First Protocol and that Soviet sources could provide less than 10 per cent of the carrying capacity.

The British and Americans accepted that the onus was on them to find most of the shipping, despite their commitments in other theatres. The Prime Minister, Winston Churchill, made a promise to send a convoy to the Arctic ports of the USSR every ten days and to deliver 1,200 tanks a month from July 1942 to January 1943, followed by 2,000 tanks and another 3,600 aircraft more than already promised. In November, the US president, Franklin D. Roosevelt, ordered Admiral Emory Land of the US Maritime Commission and then the head of the War Shipping Administration that deliveries to Russia should only be limited by 'insurmountable difficulties'. The first convoy was due at Murmansk around 12 October and the next convoy was to depart Iceland on 22 October. A motley of British, Allied and neutral shipping loaded with military stores and raw materials for the Soviet war effort would be assembled at Hvalfjörður in Iceland, convenient for ships from both sides of the Atlantic.

From Operation Dervish to Convoy PQ 11, the supplies to the USSR were mostly British, in British ships defended by the Royal Navy. A fighter force to defend Murmansk was delivered, that protected the Arctic ports and railways into the hinterland. Before September 1941, the British had dispatched 450 aircraft, 22,000 long tons (22,000 t) of rubber, 3,000,000 pairs of boots and stocks of tin, aluminium, jute, lead and wool. In September British and US representatives travelled to Moscow to study Soviet requirements and their ability to meet them. The representatives of the three countries drew up the First Protocol in October 1941 to last until June 1942. British supplied aircraft and tanks reinforced the Russian defences of Leningrad and Moscow from December 1941. The tanks and aircraft did not save Moscow but were important in the Soviet counter-offensive. The Luftwaffe was by then reduced to 600 operational aircraft on the Eastern Front, to an extent a consequence of Luftflotte 2 being sent to the Mediterranean against the British. Tanks and aircraft supplied by the British helped the Soviet counter-offensive force back the Germans further than might have been possible. In January and February 1941, deliveries of tanks and aircraft allowed the Russians to have a margin of safety should the Germans attempt to counter-attack.

=== Signals intelligence ===
==== Ultra ====
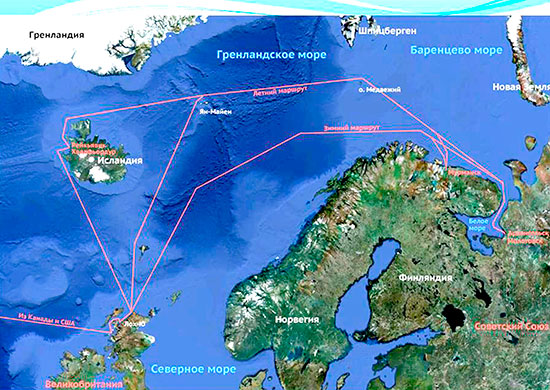
Russian map showing Arctic convoy routes from Britain and Iceland, past Norway to the Barents Sea and northern Russian ports

The British Government Code and Cypher School (GC&CS) based at Bletchley Park housed a small industry of code-breakers and traffic analysts. By June 1941, the German Enigma machine Home Waters (Heimish) settings used by surface ships and U-boats could quickly be read. On 1 February 1942, the Enigma machines used in U-boats in the Atlantic and Mediterranean were changed but German ships and the U-boats in Arctic waters continued with the older Heimish Home Hydra from 1942, Dolphin to the British). By mid-1941, British Y-stations were able to receive and read Luftwaffe W/T transmissions and give advance warning of Luftwaffe operations. In 1941, naval Headache personnel with receivers to eavesdrop on Luftwaffe wireless transmissions were embarked on warships.

=== B-Dienst ===
The rival German Beobachtungsdienst (B-Dienst, Observation Service) of the Kriegsmarine Marinenachrichtendienst (MND, Naval Intelligence Service) had broken several Admiralty codes and cyphers by 1939, which were used to help Kriegsmarine ships elude British forces and provide opportunities for surprise attacks. From June to August 1940, six British submarines were sunk in the Skaggerak using information gleaned from British wireless signals. In 1941, B-Dienst read signals from the Commander in Chief Western Approaches informing convoys of areas patrolled by U-boats, enabling the submarines to move into "safe" zones. By early 1942, B-Dienst was reading Naval Cypher No. 2 and the new Naval Cypher No. 3 but not fast enough for the results to have tactical effect and relied on traffic analysis.

=== Arctic Ocean ===
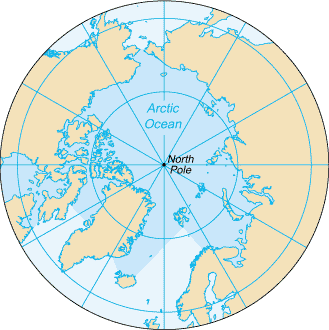
Diagram of the Arctic Ocean

Between Greenland and Norway are some of the most stormy waters of the world's oceans, 890 mi (1,440 km) of water under gales of snow, sleet and hail. The cold Arctic water was met by the Gulf Stream, warm water from the Gulf of Mexico, which became the North Atlantic Drift. Arriving at the south-west of England the drift moves between Scotland and Iceland; north of Norway the drift splits. One stream bears north of Bear Island to Svalbard and a southern stream follows the coast of Murmansk into the Barents Sea. The mingling of cold Arctic water and warmer water of higher salinity generates thick banks of fog for convoys to hide in but the waters drastically reduced the effectiveness of ASDIC as U-boats moved in waters of differing temperatures and density.

In winter, polar ice can form as far south as 50 mi (80 km) off the North Cape and in summer it can recede to Svalbard. The area is in perpetual darkness in winter and permanent daylight in the summer and can make air reconnaissance almost impossible. Around the North Cape and in the Barents Sea the sea temperature rarely rises about 4 °C (39 °F) and a man in the water will die unless rescued immediately. The cold water and air makes spray freeze on the superstructure of ships, which has to be removed quickly to avoid the ship becoming top-heavy. Conditions in U-boats were, if anything, worse the boats having to submerge in warmer water to rid the superstructure of ice. Crewmen on watch were exposed to the elements, oil lost its viscosity and nuts froze and sheared off bolts. Heaters in the hull were too demanding of current and could not be run continuously.

== Prelude ==
=== Kriegsmarine ===
German naval forces in Norway were commanded by Hermann Böhm, the Kommandierender Admiral Norwegen. Two U-boats were based in Norway in July 1941, four in September, five in December and four in January 1942. Hitler contemplated establishing a unified command but decided against it. The German battleship Tirpitz arrived at Trondheim on 16 January, the first ship of a general move of surface ships to Norway. British convoys to Russia had received little attention since they averaged only eight ships each and the long Arctic winter nights negated even the limited Luftwaffe reconnaissance effort that was available. The reinforcement of the Arctic U-boats eventually led to about 25 being in the area, sufficient to keep about eight boats at sea. The primitive facilities at Kirkenes and Narvik meant that the boats there had to go to Trondheim for more than minor repairs. In February the U-boats had achieved nothing.

=== Luftflotte 5 ===
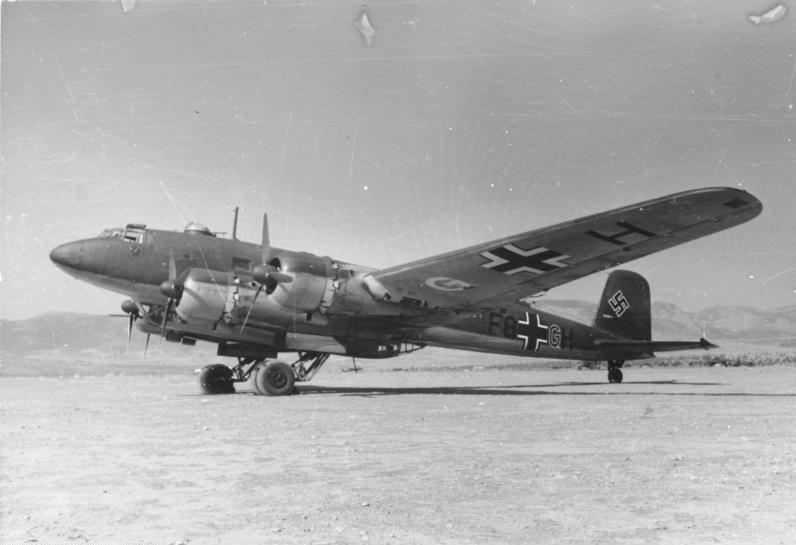
A Focke-Wulf Fw 200 Kondor of KG 40

In mid-1941, Luftflotte 5 (Air Fleet 5) had been re-organised for Operation Barbarossa with Luftgau Norwegen (Air Region Norway) headquartered in Oslo. Fliegerführer Stavanger (Air Commander Stavanger) the centre and north of Norway, Jagdfliegerführer Norwegen (Fighter Leader Norway) commanded the fighter force and Fliegerführer Kerkenes (Oberst [colonel] Andreas Nielsen) in the far north had airfields at Kirkenes and Banak. The Air Fleet had 180 aircraft, sixty of which were reserved for operations on the Karelian Front against the Red Army.

The distance from Banak to Arkhangelsk was 560 mi (900 km) and Fliegerführer Kerkenes had only ten Junkers Ju 88 bombers of Kampfgeschwader 30, thirty Junkers Ju 87 Stuka dive-bombers ten Messerschmitt Bf 109 fighters of Jagdgeschwader 77, five Messerschmitt Bf 110 heavy fighters of Zerstörergeschwader 76, ten reconnaissance aircraft and an anti-aircraft battalion. Sixty aircraft were far from adequate in such a climate and terrain where

...there is no favourable season for operations. (Earl Ziemke [1959] in Claasen [2001])

The emphasis of air operations changed from army support to anti-shipping operations only after March 1942, when Allied Arctic convoys becoming larger and more frequent coincided with the reinforcement of Norway with ships and aircraft and the less extreme climatic conditions of the Arctic summer.

=== Arctic convoys ===
A convoy was defined as at least one merchant ship sailing under the protection of at least one warship. At first the British had intended to run convoys to Russia on a forty-day cycle (the number of days between convoy departures) during the winter of 1941–1942, but this was shortened to a ten-day cycle. The round trip to Murmansk for warships was three weeks and each convoy needed a cruiser and two destroyers, which severely depleted the Home Fleet. Convoys left port and rendezvoused with the escorts at sea. A cruiser provided distant cover from a position to the west of Bear Island. Air support was limited to 330 Squadron and 269 Squadron of RAF Coastal Command from Iceland, with some help from anti-submarine patrols along the coast of Norway from RAF Sullom Voe in Shetland. Anti-submarine trawlers escorted the convoys on the first part of the outward voyage. Built for Arctic conditions, the trawlers were coal-burning ships and had sufficient endurance. The trawlers were commanded by their peacetime crews and captains with the rank of Skipper, Royal Naval Reserve (RNR) who were used to Arctic conditions, supplied by anti-submarine specialists of the Royal Naval Volunteer Reserve (RNVR). British minesweepers based at Arkhangelsk met the convoys to join the escort for the remainder of the voyage.

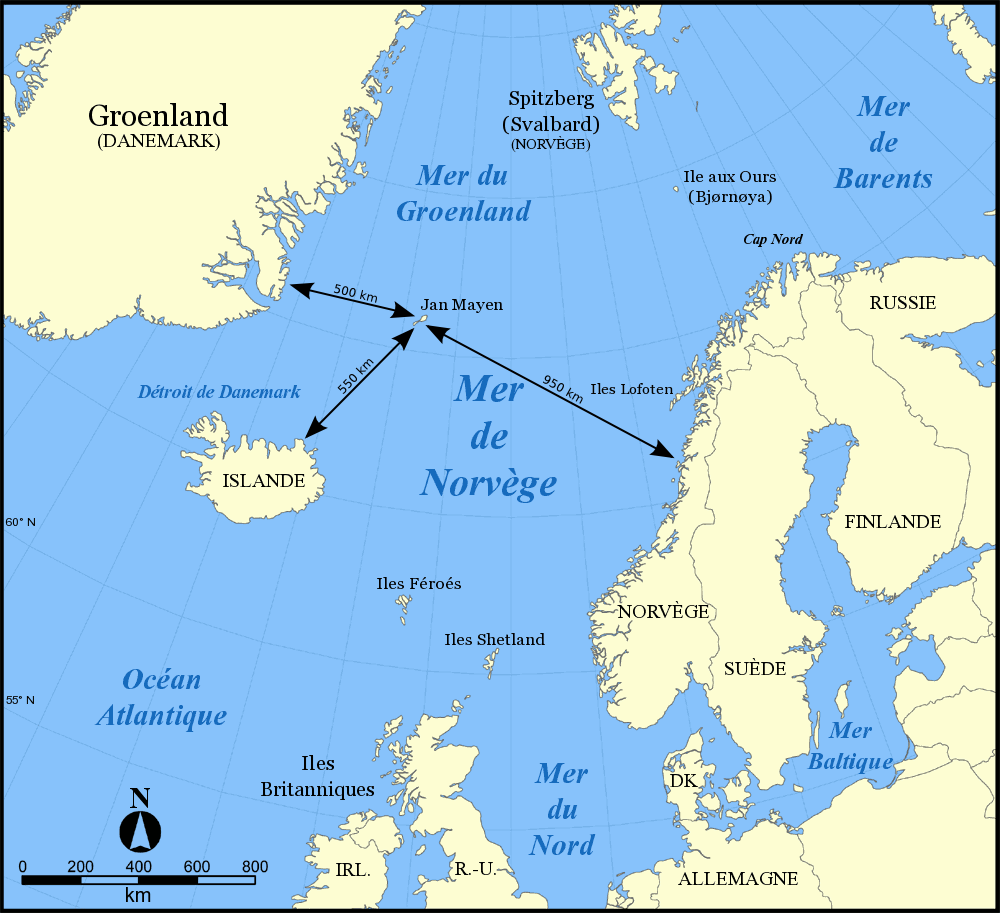
Map showing Jan Mayen in the Norwegian Sea

Convoy PQ 11 (14–22 February 1942) had arrived at Murmansk unscathed but the Admiralty thought that the run of good luck could not last. The arrival of the German battleship Tirpitz at Trondheim from the Baltic Sea, coinciding with the lengthening hours of daylight and the moderation of the weather in the Arctic, when the melting of the Polar ice would take another two to three months meant that the tactical balance would favour German anti-shipping operations by aircraft, U-boats and ships. The commander of the Home Fleet, Admiral John Tovey, predicted that attacks by German ships would occur between Jan Mayen and Bjørnøya (Bear Island). The area between Bjørnøya and Murmansk would be left to aircraft and U-boats.

The Home Fleet would have to cover the PQ and QP convoys west of Jan Mayen and to limit the strain on crews and ships, Tovey asked on 26 February that outbound PQ convoys would sail at the same time as a return QP convoys. Convoy QP 8 and Convoy PQ 12 were to be the first synchronous pair of convoys, to cross over south of Bjørnøya. More close escorts were to accompany convoys, RAF Coastal Command was to observe the fjords around Trondheim and long-range B-24 Liberators flew from Iceland, reconnoitring to the north-east. More British and Soviet submarines were to keep watch over the Norwegian coast to provide warnings of sailings by Kriegsmarine ships.

=== Convoy ===
The convoy comprised eleven British ships, four Soviets, one US, one Honduran and one Panamanian registered vessel. The Soviet destroyer Gremyashchy and five Halcyon-class minesweepers, HMS Gossamer, Harrier, Hussar, Niger and Speedwell were to provide the Eastern Local Escort out of the Kola Inlet. The Ocean Escort to take the convoy to Iceland was the destroyer HMS Offa and the Halcyon-class minesweepers HMS Britomart and HMS Sharpshooter, with the cruiser HMS Kenya (Captain Michael Denny) to act as a distant escort and transport 10 long tons (10 t) of Soviet gold, in payment for US imports.

== Voyage ==
Marine Group Command Nord (Gruppe Nord) sent four U-boats, that had recently in the Arctic, to the south-west of Bear Island. The British code-breakers at Bletchley Park decrypted signals sending U-boats towards Murmansk coast on 20 March and the Admiralty delayed the sailing of Convoy QP 9 by a day. The convoy sailed in fog, snow storms and gales that frustrated the U-boats lying in wait off the Murmansk coast. The Eastern Local Escort of a Soviet destroyer and five Halcyon-class minesweepers escorted the convoy until 23 March when the ocean escort of one British destroyer and two minesweepers, also Halcyon-class.

The freighter Pravda straggled during 23 March and the cruiser Kenya was supposed to provide the distant escort but never managed to make contact. The cruiser made a solo run to Iceland with 10 long tons (10 t) of Soviet gold bullion, destined for the US in payment for goods. The Home Fleet was at sea as the distant cover for the convoy and its reciprocal, Convoy PQ 13. German aircraft and submarines concentrated on the outbound convoy but on 24 March, U-655 was rammed by Sharpshooter and sunk with all hands; the minesweeper was damaged but remained with the convoy. The convoy arriving at Reykjavík on 3 April.

== Aftermath ==
=== Analysis ===
Rybachy Peninsula

The sailing of the convoy had been put back by 24 hours because of Ultra decrypts that U-boats were off the Kola Inlet. The first leg out−last leg in, was the most vulnerable part of the convoy route and also the area where Soviet ships and aircraft could be the most useful but rarely were. The hours of day were increasing and Luftwaffe reconnaissance could be expected to be more effective and attack by ships was also likely. The convoy was fortunate that a gale and snowstorms blew up on 23 March until the evening of 24 March, that protected the convoy from U-boats, the convoy managing to avoid dispersal, only Pravda straggling.

The captain of Sharpshooter damaged by ramming U-655, handed command of the convoy to Offa and made an independent run to Iceland. After the encounter with U-655 the rest of the voyage was uneventful. As well as the sinking of U-655 by Sharpshooter that reported the recovery of "two lifebuoys and a canvas dinghy", HMS Fury with Convoy PQ 13 was credited with the sinking of U-595 but after the war it was discovered that it sank when laying the Bantos field, off the Rybachy Peninsula, with TMB mines. While travelling to Norway, the new U-702 was mined in the North Sea and also lost with all hands.

=== Signals intelligence ===
Decrypts from Bletchley revealed that Luftflotte 5, ten U-boats and three destroyers operated in the operation against Convoy QP 9 and Convoy PQ 13. The Admiralty was able to keep the convoy escorts informed of U-boat patrol areas, when Luftwaffe raids were due and destroyer attacks. The nature of the information gleaned from decrypts lasted for several more convoy operations, including the negative evidence of the absence of the big ships, from no mention of them in signals to U-boats and destroyers.

== Allied order of battle ==
=== Merchant ships ===
Merchant ships (Note: Convoys had a standard formation of short columns, number 1 to the left in the direction of travel. Each position in the column was numbered; 11 was the first ship in column 1 and 12 was the second ship in the column; 21 was the first ship in column 2.)
Ship	Year	Flag	GRT	P'n	Notes
Murmansk to Reykjavík
SS Ashkabad	1917	Soviet Union	5,284	34	
SS Barrwhin	1929	Merchant Navy	4,998	12	
SS City of Flint	1920	United States	4,963	51	
SS Daldorch	1930	Merchant Navy	5,571	41	
SS Earlston	1941	Merchant Navy	7,195	24	Captain Hubert Hudson, Convoy Commodore
SS Empire Baffin	1941	Merchant Navy	6,978	44	
SS Empire Magpie	1919	Merchant Navy	6,211	13	
SS Hartlebury	1934	Merchant Navy	5,082	11	
SS Kingswood	1929	Merchant Navy	5,080	21	Vice-Convoy Commodore
SS LLandaff	1937	Merchant Navy	4,825	14	
SS Lowther Castle	1937	Merchant Navy	5,171	32	
SS Makawao	1921	Honduras	3,253	53	
SS Marylyn	1930	Merchant Navy	4,555	22	
SS North King	1912	Panama	4,939	52	
SS Pravda	1928	Soviet Union	2,513	23	
SS Shelon	1918	Soviet Union	2,251	33	
SS Stepan Khalturin	1921	Soviet Union	2,498	43	
SS Trevorian	1920	Merchant Navy	4,599	31	

=== Convoy formation ===
Order of sail (Note: Convoys had a standard formation of short columns, number 1 to the left in the direction of travel. Each position in the column was numbered; 11 was the first ship in column 1 and 12 was the second ship in the column; 21 was the first ship in column 2.)
column 1	column 2	column 3	column 4	column 5
11 SS Hartlebury	21 Kingswood	31 Trevorian	41 Daldorch	51 SS City of Flint
12 Barrwhin	22 Marylyn	32 Lowther Castle	42 —	52 North King
13 —	23 Pravda	33 Shelon	43 Stepan Khalturin	53 Makawao
14 Llandaff	24 Earlston	34 Ashkabad	44 SS Empire Baffin	54 —

=== Escorts ===
Escort forces (in relays)
Ship	Flag	Type	Notes
Eastern Local Escort
Gremyashchy	Soviet Navy	Gnevny-class destroyer	21–23 March 1942
HMS Gossamer	Royal Navy	Halcyon-class minesweeper	21–23 March 1942
HMS Harrier	Royal Navy	Halcyon-class minesweeper	21–23 March 1942
HMS Hussar	Royal Navy	Halcyon-class minesweeper	21–23 March 1942
HMS Niger	Royal Navy	Halcyon-class minesweeper	21–23 March 1942
HMS Speedwell	Royal Navy	Halcyon-class minesweeper	21–23 March 1942
Ocean escort
HMS Kenya	Royal Navy	Fiji-class cruiser	Failed to rendezvous, carried 10 long tons (10 t) gold for US
HMS Offa	Royal Navy	O-class destroyer	21 March − 3 April 1942
HMS Britomart	Royal Navy	Halcyon-class minesweeper	21 March − 3 April 1942
HMS Sharpshooter	Royal Navy	Halcyon-class minesweeper	21 March − 3 April 1942
Soviet submarines
K-21	Soviet Navy	Soviet K-class submarine	Convoy cover
K-22	Soviet Navy	Soviet K-class submarine	Convoy cover
Shch-404	Soviet Navy	Shchuka-class submarine	Convoy cover
Shch-421	Soviet Navy	Shchuka-class submarine	Convoy cover

== German order of battle ==
=== U-boats and ships ===
Kriegsmarine
Name	Flag	Class	Notes
U-209	Kriegsmarine	Type VIIC submarine	Off the kola Inlet
U-376	Kriegsmarine	Type VIIC submarine	Off the kola Inlet
U-378	Kriegsmarine	Type VIIC submarine	Off the kola Inlet
U-655	Kriegsmarine	Type VIIC submarine	Off Kola Inlet, 24 March, rammed, Sharpshooter, 73°00′N, 21°00′W, 45† 0 surv.
gruppe Ziethen
U-435	Kriegsmarine	Type VIIC submarine	Off Bear Island
U-436	Kriegsmarine	Type VIIC submarine	Off Bear Island
U-454	Kriegsmarine	Type VIIC submarine	Off Bear Island
U-456	Kriegsmarine	Type VIIC submarine	Off Bear Island
U-585	Kriegsmarine	Type VIIC submarine	Off Bear Island
U-589	Kriegsmarine	Type VIIC submarine	Off Bear Island

== Bibliography ==
- Blair, Clay (1997). Hitler's U-boat War: The Hunters 1939−1942. London: Weidenfeld & Nicolson. ISBN 0-297-84076-2.
- Boog, H.; Rahn, W.; Stumpf, R.; Wegner, B. (2001). The Global War: Widening of the Conflict into a World War and the Shift of the Initiative 1941–1943. Germany in the Second World War. Vol. VI. Translated by Osers, E.; Brownjohn, J.; Crampton, P.; Willmot, L. (Eng trans. Oxford University Press, London ed.). Potsdam: Militärgeschichtliches Forschungsamt (Research Institute for Military History). ISBN 0-19-822888-0.
  - Rahn, W. "Part III The War at Sea in the Atlantic and in the Arctic Ocean III. The Conduct of the War in the Atlantic and the Coastal Area (b) The Third Phase, April–December 1941: The Extension of the Areas of Operations". In Boog et al. (2001).
- Boyd, Andrew (2024). Arms for Russia & the Naval War in the Arctic 1941–1945. Barnsley: Seaforth (Pen & Sword). ISBN 978-1-3990-3886-7.
- Claasen, A. R. A. (2001). Hitler's Northern War: The Luftwaffe's Ill-fated Campaign, 1940–1945. Lawrence, KS: University Press of Kansas. ISBN 0-7006-1050-2.
- Hancock, W. K.; Gowing, M. M. (1949). Hancock, W. K. (ed.). British War Economy. History of the Second World War, United Kingdom Civil Series. London: HMSO. OCLC 630191560.
- Hinsley, F. H.; et al. (1981). British Intelligence in the Second World War. Its Influence on Strategy and Operations. History of the Second World War. Vol. II. London: HMSO. ISBN 0-11-630934-2.
- Hinsley, F. H. (1994) [1993]. British Intelligence in the Second World War: Its Influence on Strategy and Operations. History of the Second World War, United Kingdom Military Series (2nd rev. abr. ed.). London: HMSO. ISBN 978-0-11-630961-7.
- Jordan, Roger W. (2006) [1999]. The World's Merchant Fleets 1939: The Particulars and Wartime Fates of 6,000 Ships (2nd ed.). London: Chatham/Lionel Leventhal. ISBN 978-1-86176-293-1.
- Kahn, D. (1973) [1967]. The Codebreakers: The Story of Secret Writing (10th abr. Signet, Chicago ed.). New York: Macmillan. LCCN 63-16109. OCLC 78083316.
- Kenyon, David (2023). Arctic Convoys: Bletchley Park and the War for the Seas. New Haven & London: Yale University Press. ISBN 978-0-300-27501-8.
- Macksey, K. (2004) [2003]. The Searchers: Radio Intercept in two World Wars (Cassell Military Paperbacks ed.). London: Cassell. ISBN 978-0-304-36651-4.
- Mitchell, W. H.; Sawyer, L. A. (1990). The Empire Ships (2nd ed.). London, New York, Hamburg, Hong Kong: Lloyd's of London Press Ltd. ISBN 1-85044-275-4.
- Paterson, Lawrence (2016). Steel and Ice: The U-boat Battle in the Arctic and Black Sea 1941–45. Stroud: The History Press. ISBN 978-1-59114-258-4.
- Rohwer, Jürgen; Hümmelchen, Gerhard (2005) [1972]. Chronology of the War at Sea, 1939–1945: The Naval History of World War Two (3rd rev. ed.). London: Chatham. ISBN 978-1-86176-257-3.
- Roskill, S. W. (1957) [1954]. Butler, J. R. M. (ed.). The War at Sea 1939–1945: The Defensive. History of the Second World War United Kingdom Military Series. Vol. I (4th impr. ed.). London: HMSO. OCLC 881709135. Archived from the original on 27 February 2022.
- Roskill, S. W. (1962) [1956]. The Period of Balance. History of the Second World War: The War at Sea 1939–1945. Vol. II. London: HMSO. OCLC 174453986. Archived from the original on 6 March 2014.
- Ruegg, R.; Hague, A. (1993) [1992]. Convoys to Russia: Allied Convoys and Naval Surface Operations in Arctic Waters 1941–1945 (2nd rev. enl. ed.). Kendal: World Ship Society. ISBN 0-905617-66-5.
- Sharpe, Peter (1998). U-Boat Fact File. Leicester: Midland Publishing. ISBN 1-85780-072-9.
- Woodman, Richard (1994). Arctic Convoys 1941–1945 (hbk. ed.). London: John Murray. ISBN 0-7195-5079-3.
- Woodman, Richard (2004) [1994]. Arctic Convoys 1941–1945. London: John Murray. ISBN 978-0-7195-5752-1.
- Ziemke, Earl F. (1959). The German Northern Theatre of Operations, 1940–1945. Washington, DC: Headquarters, United States Department of the Army. OCLC 610363660. 20-271.
