= SS Empire Baffin =

World War II merchant ship of the United Kingdom

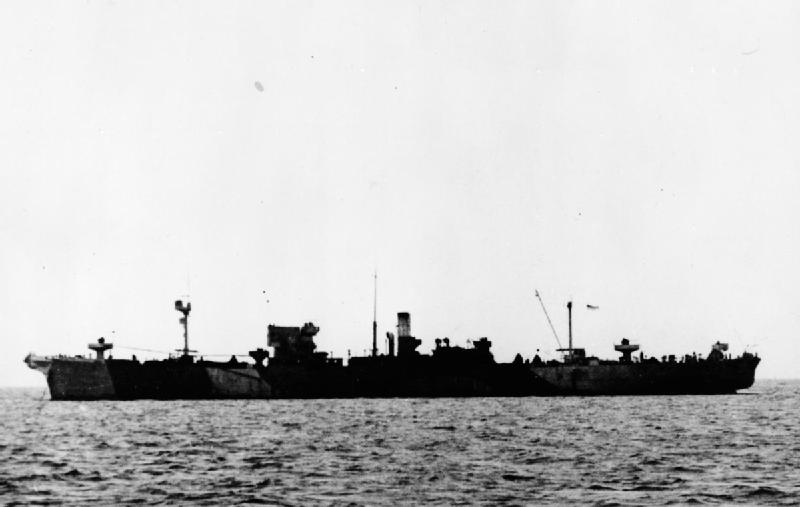
- HMS Sancroft

History
- Name: Empire Baffin (1941–1943); HMS Sancroft (1943–1946); Empire Baffin (1946); Clintonia (1946–1960); Aspis (1960–1963)
- Owner: Ministry of War Transport (1941–1943); Royal Navy (1943–1946); Ministry of War Transport (1946); Stag Line Ltd (1946–1960); Alcestis Shipping Co SA (1960–1963)
- Operator: J Robinson & Sons, North Shields (1941–1943); Royal Navy (1943–1946); J Robinson & Sons, North Shields (1946–1960); Faros Shipping Co Ltd, London (1960–1963)
- Port of registry: (United Kingdom) Greenock (1941–1943); (United Kingdom) Royal Navy (1943–1946); (United Kingdom) UK (1946–1960); Greece (1960–1963)
- Builder: Lithgows Ltd, Port Glasgow
- Yard number: 958
- Launched: 28 August 1941
- Completed: October 1941
- Identification: Official Number 168968 (1941–1943, 1946–1960); Code Letters BCQR (1941–1943)
- Fate: Scrapped 1963

General characteristics
- Tonnage: 6,978 GRT; 10,000 long tons deadweight (DWT)
- Length: 431 ft (131.37 m)
- Beam: 56 ft 2 in (17.12 m)
- Depth: 34 ft 2 in (10.41 m)
- Propulsion: 1 x triple expansion steam engine (D Rowan & Co Ltd, Glasgow) 439 hp (327 kW)

Empire Baffin was a 6,978 ton cargo ship which was built by Lithgows Ltd, Port Glasgow in 1941 for the Ministry of War Transport (MoWT). She was commissioned in 1943 as HMS Sancroft, being converted into a cable laying ship for Operation Pluto. She was returned to the MoWT in 1946 and subsequently sold and renamed Clintonia. A final change of ownership in 1960 saw her renamed Aspis and she was scrapped in 1963.

== History ==
Empire Baffin was built by Lithgows Ltd, Port Glasgow as yard number 958. She was launched on 28 August 1941 and completed in October 1941. She was operated under the management of J Robinson & Sons, North Shields.

=== War service ===
Empire Baffin was a member of a number of convoys during the Second World War.

PQ 2

Convoy PQ 2 sailed from Liverpool on 13 October 1941 and arrived at Arkhangelsk on 30 October. Empire Baffin joined from Scapa Flow on 17 October.

QP 3

Convoy QP 3 sailed from Arkhangelsk on 27 November 1941 and dispersed on 3 December. Empire Baffin was carrying a cargo of magnesite bound for the Tees.

PQ 11

Convoy PQ 11 sailed from Kirkness on 14 February 1942 and arrived at Murmansk on 22 February.

QP 9

Convoy QP 9 sailed from the Kola Inlet on 21 March 1942 and arrived at Reykjavík on 3 April. Empire Baffin was carrying a cargo of Chloride of Potassium bound for Middlesbrough.

UR 23

Convoy UR 23 sailed from Loch Ewe on 8 May 1942 and arrived at Reykjavík on 12 May.

PQ 16

Convoy PQ 16 sailed from Reykjavík on 21 May 1942 and arrived at Murmansk on 30 May. Empire Baffin was attacked by German aircraft, which bombed her scoring several near misses. Her propeller, driveshaft and bearings were damaged and she developed a leak in her stern gland. The Chief Engineer had to spend three days and nights in the shaft tunnel tending to the bearings. Empire Baffin was repaired and returned to service.

QP 13U

Convoy QP 13U sailed from Arkhangelsk on 26 June 1942 and arrived at Reykjavík on 7 July. Empire Baffin was bound for the Tyne.

PQ 18

Convoy PQ 18 sailed from Loch Ewe on 2 September 1942 and arrived at Arkhangelsk on 21 September.

QP 15

Convoy QP 15 sailed from the Kola Inlet on 17 November 1942 and arrived at Loch Ewe on 30 November.

JW 52

Convoy JW 52 sailed from Liverpool on 17 January 1943 and arrived at the Kola Inlet on 27 January.

JW 53

Convoy JW 33 sailed from Loch Ewe on 15 February 1943 and arrived at the Kola Inlet on or about 27 February. Empire Baffin had to return to Loch Ewe due to being damaged in severe weather.

SC 141

Convoy SC 151 sailed from Halifax Nova Scotia on 3 September 1943 and arrived at Liverpool on 17 September. Empire Baffin was carrying a general cargo bound for London.

Empire Baffin was taken over by the Admiralty and converted by Green & Silley Weir Ltd, London to a cable laying ship for Operation Pluto, and commissioned as HMS Sancroft. She was used in the support of Operation Overlord. Those killed whilst serving on Empire Baffin during the war are commemorated at the Tower Hill Memorial, London.

=== Postwar ===
In 1946, HMS Sancroft reverted to the MoWT and regained her Empire Baffin name. Later that year, she was sold to Stag Line Ltd, North Shields still under the management of J Robinson & Sons. She was the fifth Stag Line ship to bear the name Clintonia. She was purchased at a cost of £30,000 and converted back to a cargo ship and also from coal to oil fuel at a cost of £137,911. On 10 December 1959, Clintonia was sold to Alcestis Shipping Co. SA, Greece for £62,500. She was renamed Apsis She was operated under the management of Faros Shipping Co Ltd, London.. Apsis served until 1963 when she was sold for scrap. She arrived at Yokosuka, Japan in December 1963 for scrapping.

== Official number and code letters ==
Official Numbers were a forerunner to IMO Numbers.

Empire Baffin had the UK Official Number 168968 and used the Code Letters BCQR.
