= SS City of Flint =

Several steamships have borne the name City of Flint, after Flint, Michigan:

- SS City of Flint (1919) was a Design 1022 steamship. She was launched in 1919 and sunk by a German submarine in 1943.
- SS City of Flint 32 (1929) was a Great Lakes carferry launched in 1929, decommissioned in 1967 and sold for conversion as a river ferry barge in 1969.
