= SS Hartlebury =

Cargo steamship

Coordinates: 72°30′N 52°00′E

History

United Kingdom
- Name: Hartlebury
- Namesake: Hartlebury
- Owner: National SS Co
- Operator: J&C Harrison
- Port of registry: London
- Builder: Lithgows, Port Glasgow
- Yard number: 865
- Launched: 30 January 1934
- Completed: March 1934
- Identification: UK official number 163443; call sign GWQS
- Fate: Sunk by torpedo, 7 July 1942

General characteristics
- Type: Cargo ship
- Tonnage: 5,082 GRT, 3,035 NRT
- Length: 418.0 ft (127.4 m)
- Beam: 56.2 ft (17.1 m)
- Draught: 24 ft (7.3 m)
- Depth: 24.6 ft (7.5 m)
- Installed power: 472 NHP
- Propulsion: triple expansion steam engine; plus exhaust turbine driving steam compressor
- Speed: 11 knots (20 km/h)
- Crew: 51 + 7 DEMS gunners
- Sensors & processing systems: wireless direction finding
- Notes: sister ships: Harlingen, Hardingham, Harbledown, Harpasa

SS Hartlebury was a cargo steamship that was launched in Scotland in 1934 for J&C Harrison Ltd. A U-boat sank her in the Barents Sea in 1942 during the Arctic Convoy PQ 17.

== Building ==
From 1932 to 1934 Lithgows of Port Glasgow built a series of five sister ships for J&C Harrison Ltd of London. Harlingen was launched on 17 November 1932 and completed in January 1933. Hardingham was launched on 15 December 1932 and completed in February 1933. Harbledown was launched on 27 March 1933 and completed that May. Harpasa was launched on 5 December 1933 and completed in January 1934. Hartlebury was launched on 30 January 1934 and completed that March.

Each of the five ships had the same beam of 56.2 ft (17.1 m). The last two ships to be built, Harpasa and Hartlebury, had a registered length of 418.0 ft (127.4 m), which was 10 ft (3 m) shorter than their sisters, and a depth of 24.6 ft (7.5 m), which was 1.6 ft (0.5 m) less than their sisters.

Hartlebury had a single screw. David Rowan and Co of Glasgow built her engines. Her main propulsion was a three-cylinder triple expansion steam engine. Exhaust steam from its low-pressure cylinder drove a low-pressure steam turbine, which in turn drove a steam compressor. Her turbine drove the same propeller as her piston engine. Between them the two engines were rated at 472 NHP and gave Hartlebury a speed of 11 knots (20 km/h).

== Second World War service ==
=== Transatlantic voyages ===
Hartlebury spent the first two years of the Second World War making transatlantic crossings. Between November 1939 and July 1941 she took part in four HX convoys, bringing grain from the US and Canada to the UK and Ireland. In 1940 and 1941 she also made two trips to bring grain from South America to Britain, on which she joined SL convoys from Freetown in Sierra Leone for the latter part of her voyage home. Hartlebury's final transatlantic voyage was in September 1941, when she brought a cargo of steel from the US to the UK via Convoy SC 43 from Sydney, Nova Scotia to Liverpool.

=== Arctic voyages ===
In October 1941 Hartlebury was transferred to Arctic convoys. She took part in Convoy PQ 2 to Archangel in October 1941 and Convoy PQ 11 to Murmansk in February 1942. By April 1942 all four of Hartlebury's sister ships had been sunk by enemy action. A mine sank Hardingham in 1940. U-boats sank Harbledown and Harlingen in 1941. An air raid burned and sank Harpasa in April 1942.

In May 1942 Hartlebury left Britain with a cargo of 36 tanks, six other vehicles, seven aircraft and 2,409 tons of military stores. Convoy UR 26 took her from Loch Ewe in western Scotland to Hvalfjörður in US-occupied Iceland. There she joined Convoy PQ 17 to Archangel, which left Hvalfjörður on 27 March. German forces attacked Convoy PQ 17 from 2 July and sank two of its cargo ships on 4 July. The convoy was then ordered to scatter and ships were ordered to head independently for Novaya Zemlya.

=== Loss ===
Hartlebury continued independently. By the evening of 7 July she was 17 nautical miles (31 km) from Britwin lighthouse on the coast of Novaya Zemlya. At 1835 hrs she was hit by two torpedoes from a spread of three fired by U-355. The explosions killed six members of her crew and destroyed all but one of her lifeboats. Then at 1845 hrs a third torpedo hit her, and Hartlebury sank bow-first with 10 minutes.

Her remaining lifeboat tipped over when it was launched, dropping its occupants into the sea. Hartlebury had life-rafts as well as lifeboats. Her remaining crew jumped into the sea to try to reach her rafts. A total of 38 men were killed: 29 crew, seven DEMS gunners and two Royal Navy signalmen.

Harblebury's Master, Captain George W Stephenson, and 12 other survivors reached land at Pomorski Bay. Seven other survivors reached the US cargo steamship Winston-Salem, which was aground on North Gusini Shoal. A Soviet survey ship rescued the seven, then transferred them to the cargo motor ship Empire Tide. All 20 of Hartlebury's survivors were transferred to the corvette HMS La Malouine, which landed them at Archangel on 25 July.

When Hartlebury was torpedoed, falling débris trapped Captain Stephenson. He was freed and survived, but died less than a year later from his head trauma.
