= Convoy PQ 2 =

- Part of Arctic Convoys of the Second World War
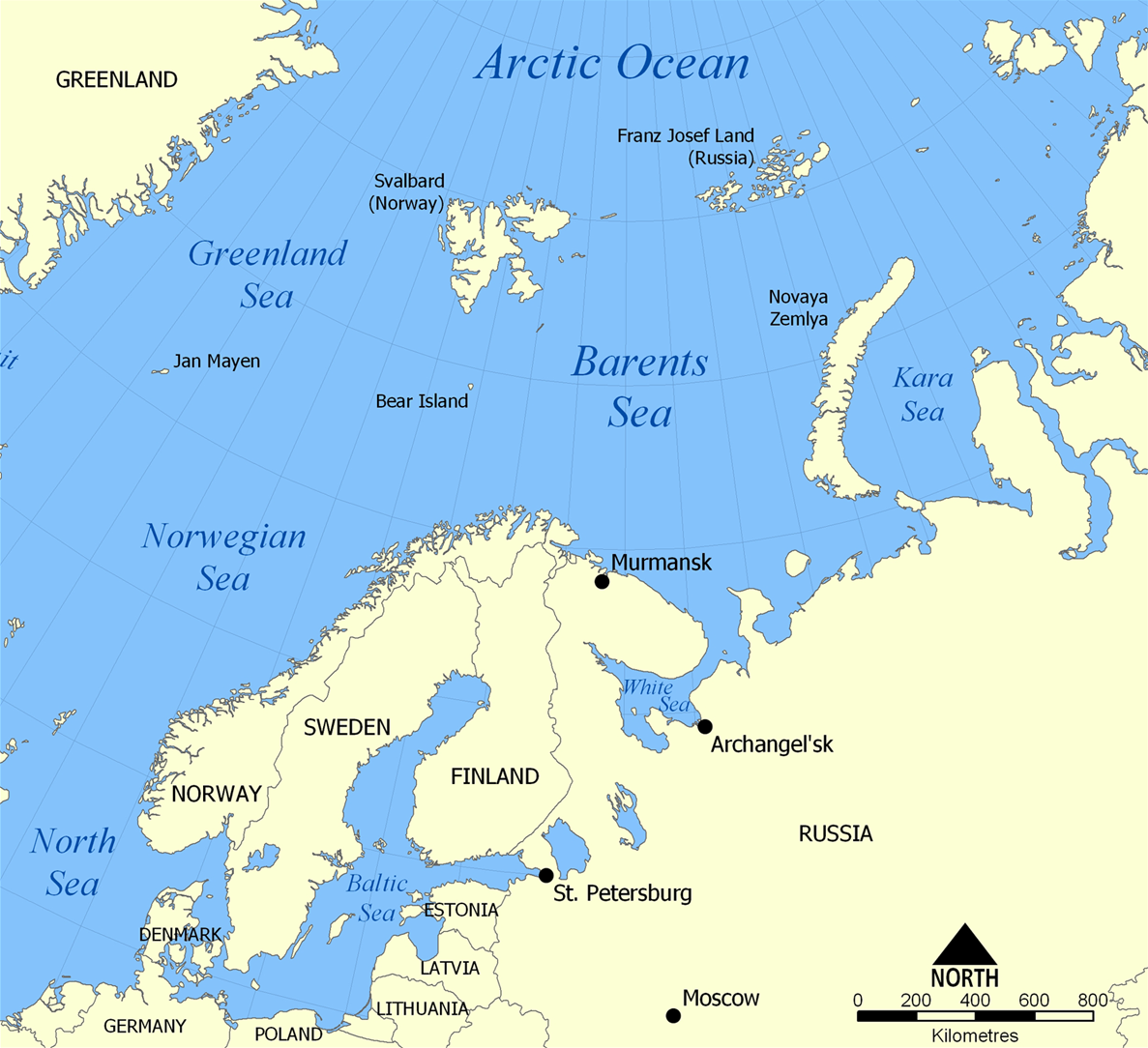
- The Norwegian and the Barents seas, site of the Arctic convoys
Date	17–30 October 1941
Location	Arctic Ocean
Result	British victory

Belligerents
Royal Navy; Merchant Navy	(Nazi Germany) Luftwaffe; Kriegsmarine

Commanders and leaders
	Hans-Jürgen Stumpff; Hermann Böhm

Strength
6 merchant ships; 11 escorts (in relays)	

Casualties and losses
Nil	Nil

Convoy PQ 2 (17–30 October 1941) was the third of the Arctic Convoys of the Second World War by which the Western Allies supplied the Soviet Union after Operation Barbarossa, the German invasion, which began on 22 June 1941. The convoy sailed from Scapa Flow and arrived safely at Arkhangelsk.

From Operation Dervish at the end of August 1941 to 20 December, six more convoys (Convoy PQ 1 to Convoy PQ 6) sent 45 ships, all of which reached Arkhangelsk or Murmansk. German knowledge of these and the reciprocal westbound convoys (Convoy QP 1 to Convoy QP 4) was too vague to plan attacks by the limited forces available to the Kriegsmarine and the Luftwaffe in Norway.

On 13 November 1941, the commander-in-chief of the Kriegsmarine, Großadmiral (Grand Admiral) Erich Raeder, told Hitler that, owing to the extreme weather and the lack of air reconnaissance, the prospects of the small number of U-boats in the Arctic Ocean were poor.

== Background ==
=== Lend-lease ===
After Operation Barbarossa, the German invasion of the USSR, began on 22 June 1941, the UK and USSR signed an agreement in July that they would "render each other assistance and support of all kinds in the present war against Hitlerite Germany". Before September 1941 the British had dispatched 450 aircraft, 22,000 long tons (22,000 t) of rubber, 3,000,000 pairs of boots and stocks of tin, aluminium, jute, lead and wool. In September British and US representatives travelled to Moscow to study Soviet requirements and their ability to meet them. The representatives of the three countries drew up a protocol in October 1941 to last until June 1942.

=== Signals intelligence ===
==== Ultra ====
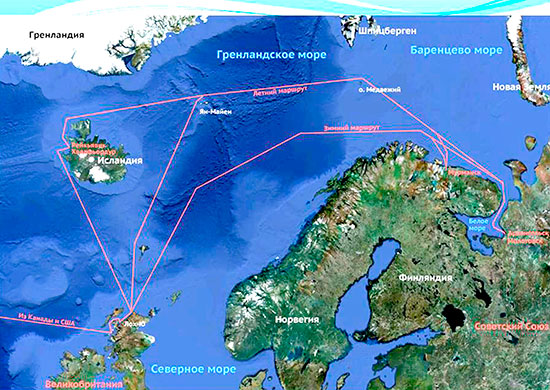
Russian map showing Arctic convoy routes from Britain and Iceland, past Norway to the Barents Sea and northern Russian ports

The British Government Code and Cypher School (GC&CS) based at Bletchley Park housed a small industry of code-breakers and traffic analysts. By June 1941, the German Enigma machine Home Waters (Heimish) settings used by surface ships and U-boats could quickly be read. On 1 February 1942, the Enigma machines used in U-boats in the Atlantic and Mediterranean were changed but German ships and the U-boats in Arctic waters continued with the older Heimish Home Hydra from 1942, Dolphin to the British). By mid-1941, British Y-stations were able to receive and read Luftwaffe W/T transmissions and give advance warning of Luftwaffe operations. In 1941, naval Headache personnel with receivers to eavesdrop on Luftwaffe wireless transmissions were embarked on warships.

=== B-Dienst ===
The rival German Beobachtungsdienst (B-Dienst, Observation Service) of the Kriegsmarine Marinenachrichtendienst (MND, Naval Intelligence Service) had broken several Admiralty codes and cyphers by 1939, which were used to help Kriegsmarine ships elude British forces and provide opportunities for surprise attacks. From June to August 1940, six British submarines were sunk in the Skaggerak using information gleaned from British wireless signals. In 1941, B-Dienst read signals from the Commander in Chief Western Approaches informing convoys of areas patrolled by U-boats, enabling the submarines to move into "safe" zones.

=== Arctic Ocean ===
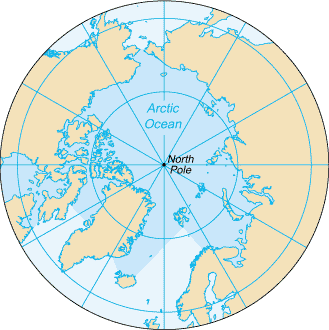
Diagram of the Arctic Ocean

Between Greenland and Norway are some of the most stormy waters of the world's oceans, 890 mi (1,440 km) of water under gales full of snow, sleet and hail. The cold Arctic water was met by the Gulf Stream, warm water from the Gulf of Mexico, which became the North Atlantic Drift. Arriving at the south-west of England the drift moves between Scotland and Iceland; north of Norway the drift splits. One stream bears north of Bear Island to Svalbard and a southern stream follows the coast of Murmansk into the Barents Sea. The mingling of cold Arctic water and warmer water of higher salinity generates thick banks of fog for convoys to hide in but the waters drastically reduced the effectiveness of ASDIC as U-boats moved in waters of differing temperatures and density.

In winter, polar ice can form as far south as 50 mi (80 km) off the North Cape and in summer it can recede to Svalbard. The area is in perpetual darkness in winter and permanent daylight in the summer and can make air reconnaissance almost impossible. Around the North Cape and in the Barents Sea the sea temperature rarely rises about 4° Celsius and a man in the water will die unless rescued immediately. The cold water and air makes spray freeze on the superstructure of ships, which has to be removed quickly to avoid the ship becoming top-heavy. Conditions in U-boats were, if anything, worse the boats having to submerge in warmer water to rid the superstructure of ice. Crewmen on watch were exposed to the elements, oil lost its viscosity, nuts froze and sheared off. Heaters in the hull wee too demanding of current and could not be run continuously.

== Prelude ==
=== Kriegsmarine ===
German naval forces in Norway were commanded by Hermann Böhm, the Kommandierender Admiral Norwegen. Two U-boats were based in Norway in July 1941, four in September, five in December and four in January 1942. By mid-February twenty U-boats were anticipated in the region, with six based in Norway, two in Narvik or Tromsø, two at Trondheim and two at Bergen. Hitler contemplated the establishment of a unified command but decided against it. The German battleship Tirpitz arrived at Trondheim on 16 January, the first ship of a general move of surface ships to Norway. British convoys to Russia had received little attention since they averaged only eight ships each and the long Arctic winter nights negated even the limited Luftwaffe effort that was available.

=== Luftflotte 5 ===
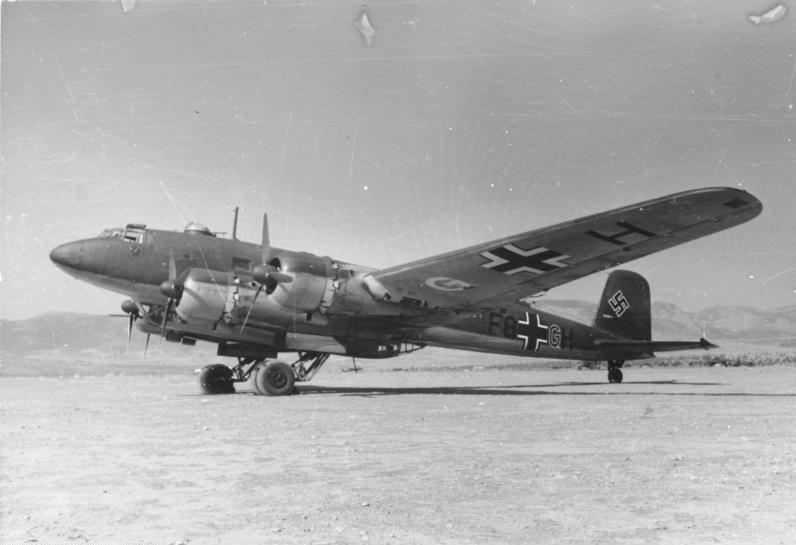
A Focke-Wulf Fw 200 Kondor of KG 40

In mid-1941, Luftflotte 5 (Air Fleet 5) had been re-organised for Operation Barbarossa with Luftgau Norwegen (Air Region Norway) headquartered in Oslo. Fliegerführer Stavanger (Air Commander Stavanger) in central and northern Norway, Jagdfliegerführer Norwegen (Fighter Leader Norway) commanded the fighter force and Fliegerführer Kerkenes (Oberst [colonel] Andreas Nielsen) the far north airfields at Kirkenes and Banak. The Air Fleet had 180 aircraft, sixty of which were reserved for operations on the Karelian Front against the Red Army.

The distance from Banak to Arkhangelsk was 560 mi (900 km) and Fliegerführer Kerkenes had only ten Junkers Ju 88 bombers of Kampfgeschwader 30, thirty Junkers Ju 87 Stuka dive-bombers, ten Messerschmitt Bf 109 fighters of Jagdgeschwader 77, five Messerschmitt Bf 110 heavy fighters of Zerstörergeschwader 76, ten reconnaissance aircraft and an anti-aircraft battalion. Sixty aircraft were far from adequate in such a climate and terrain where

...there is no favourable season for operations. (Earl Ziemke [1959] in Claasen [2001])

The emphasis of air operations changed from army support to anti-shipping operations only after March 1942, when Allied Arctic convoys becoming larger and more frequent coincided with the reinforcement of Norway with ships and aircraft and the less extreme climatic conditions of the Arctic summer.

=== Arctic convoys ===
A convoy was defined as at least one merchant ship sailing under the protection of at least one warship. At first the British had intended to run convoys to Russia on a forty-day cycle (the number of days between convoy departures) during the winter of 1941–1942 but this was shortened to a ten-day cycle. The round trip to Murmansk for warships was three weeks and each convoy needed a cruiser and two destroyers, which severely depleted the Home Fleet. Convoys left port and rendezvoused with the escorts at sea. A cruiser provided distant cover from a position to the west of Bear Island. Air support was limited to 330 Squadron and 269 Squadron, RAF Coastal Command from Iceland, with some help from anti-submarine patrols from Sullom Voe, in Shetland, along the coast of Norway. Anti-submarine trawlers escorted the convoys on the first part of the outbound journey. Built for Arctic conditions, the trawlers were coal-burning ships with sufficient endurance. The trawlers were commanded by their peacetime crews and captains with the rank of Skipper, Royal Naval Reserve (RNR), who were used to Arctic conditions, supplemented by anti-submarine specialists of the Royal Naval Volunteer Reserve (RNVR). British minesweepers based at Arkhangelsk met the convoys to join the escort for the remainder of the voyage.

== Voyage ==
The ships of Convoy PQ 2, Harpalion, Hartlebury, Queen City, Orient City, Temple Arch and Empire Baffin departed from Liverpool on 10 October 1941 and assembled at Scapa Flow in the Orkneys. The convoy sailed for Arkhangelsk on 17 October. From 18 to 30 October the convoy was escorted by the County-class cruiser HMS Norfolk, the destroyers HMS Eclipse and Icarus,with the Halcyon-class minesweepers HMS Bramble, Seagull and Speedy. The convoy was met by the minesweepers HMS Gossamer, Hussar and Leda from Arkhangelsk on the night of 29/30 October, arriving on 30 October.

== Aftermath ==
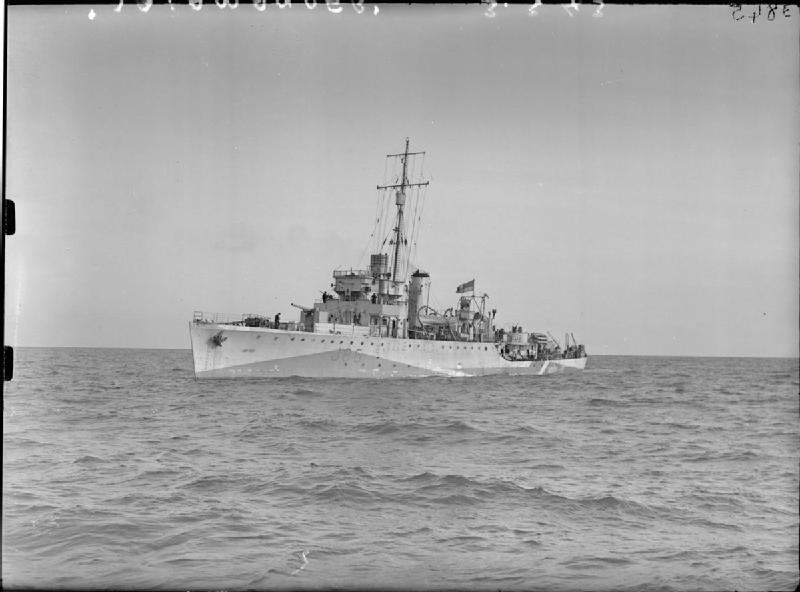
Halcyon-class minesweeper

Convoy PQ 2 arrived without loss on 30 October 1941. The convoy was part of a run to Convoy PQ 11 that had little difficulty apart from the weather, in reaching the Arctic north of the USSR. These convoys delivered 75 ships out of 77, with one early return and one loss to a U-boat. The Germans paid little attention to the first eleven British convoys before March 1942, which averaged only eight ships each. (Note: Some cargo had been stored badly, that loaded at Glasgow in particular.) In the winter darkness the Luftwaffe had great difficulty in finding Allied convoys, which made attacks on Murmansk and the railway south more practical. As the Allied supply effort increased in 1942, the Arctic route carrying 1.2 million tons of supplies of the total of 2.3 million tons, the reinforcement of the Luftwaffe and Kriegsmarine led to German countermeasures growing in extent and effect.

To protect return convoys and sweep for mines, the commander of the Home Fleet, John Tovey, established a force of ocean-going, Halcyon-class minesweepers at the Kola naval base, which had the speed, armament and anti-submarine capacity similar to that of Flower-class corvettes. As specialist vessels the minesweepers usually had experienced career officers. The fleet oiler RFA Aldersdale arrived with Operation Dervish (21–31 August 1941), to stay at Kola to fuel ships for the return journey. Soviet destroyers at Polyarnoe were available to reinforce convoy escorts for the last part of the journey.

=== Subsequent operations ===
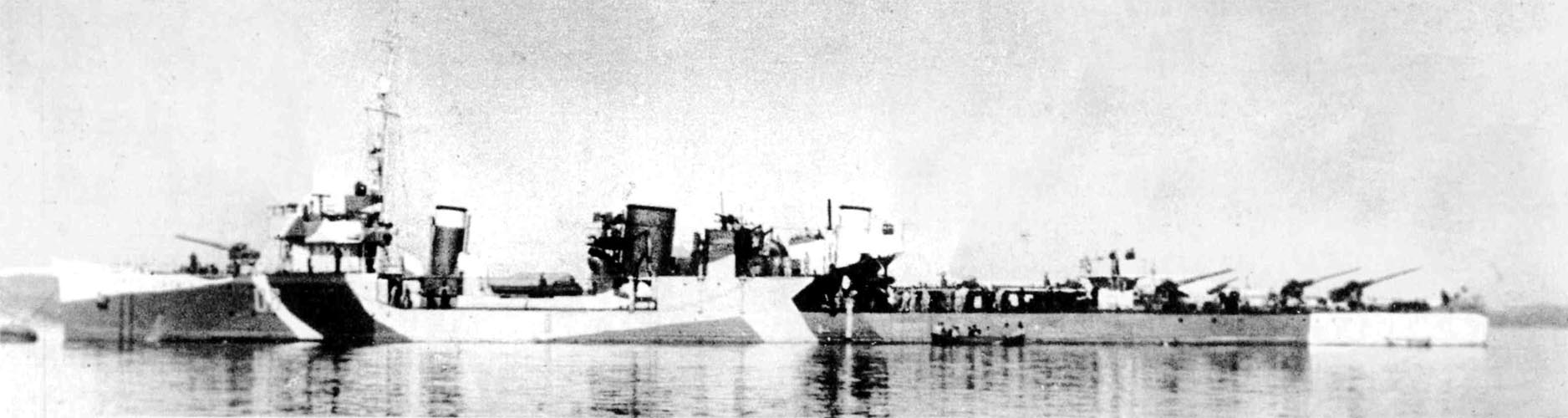
The Soviet destroyer Uritskiy

From Operation Dervish, at the end of August 1941, the first convoy which comprised seven ships, to 20 December, six more convoys (Convoy PQ 1 to Convoy PQ 6) sent 45 ships, all of which reached Arkhangelsk or Murmansk. German awareness of these and the reciprocal westbound convoys (Convoy QP 1 to Convoy QP 4) was too vague to plan attacks on the convoys by the Kriegsmarine or the Luftwaffe. On 13 November 1941, the commander-in-chief of the Kriegsmarine, Großadmiral (Grand Admiral) Erich Raeder, told Hitler that, owing to the extreme weather and the lack of air reconnaissance, the prospects of the small number of U-boats in the Arctic Ocean were poor.

== Ships and escorts ==
=== Merchant ships ===
Convoyed ships
Ship	Year	Flag	GRT	P'n	Notes
SS Empire Baffin	1941	Merchant Navy	6,978	22	
SS Harpalion	1932	Merchant Navy	5,486	21	Vice-Convoy Commodore
SS Hartlebury	1934	Merchant Navy	5,082	32	
SS Orient City	1940	Merchant Navy	5,095	11	Convoy Commodore
SS Queen City	1924	Merchant Navy	4,814	31	
SS Temple Arch	1940	Merchant Navy	5,138	12	
Did not sail
MV Kheti	1927	Merchant Navy	2,734	—	Ammunition carrier

=== Convoy formation ===
Standard convoy formation (Note: Convoys had a standard formation of short columns, number 1 to the left in the direction of travel. Each position in the column was numbered; 11 was the first ship in column 1 and 12 was the second ship in the column; 21 was the first ship in column 2.)
column 1	column 2	column 3
11 Orient City	21 Harpalion	31 Queen City
12 Temple Arch	22 Empire Baffin	32 Hartlebury

=== Escorts ===
Convoy escorts
Ship	Flag	Type	Notes
Ocean escort
HMS Norfolk	Royal Navy	County-class cruiser	18–30 October
HMS Eclipse	Royal Navy	E-class destroyer	17–30 October
HMS Icarus	Royal Navy	I-class destroyer	17–30 October
HMS Bramble	Royal Navy	Halcyon-class minesweeper	17–30 October
HMS Seagull	Royal Navy	Halcyon-class minesweeper	14–30 October
HMS Speedy	Royal Navy	Halcyon-class minesweeper	14–30 October
Eastern local escort
Valerian Kuybyshev	Soviet Navy	Novik-class destroyer	29–30 October
Uritski	Soviet Navy	Orfey-class destroyer	29–30 October
HMS Gossamer	Royal Navy	Halcyon-class minesweeper	29–30 October
HMS Hussar	Royal Navy	Halcyon-class minesweeper	29–30 October
HMS Leda	Royal Navy	Halcyon-class minesweeper	29–30 October
