= Convoy QP 4 =

Artic convoy of the Second World War

- Part of Arctic Convoys of the Second World War
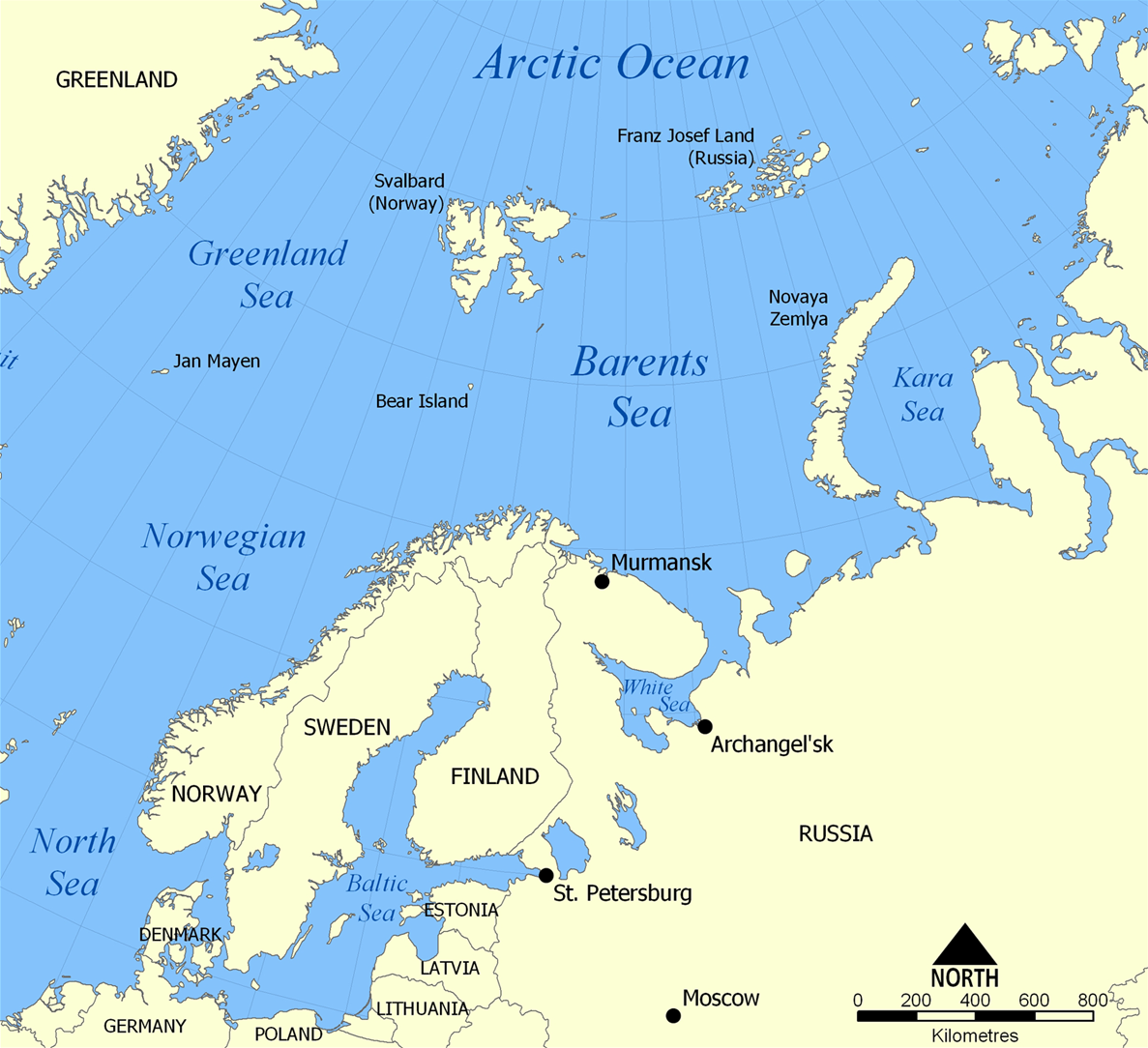
- The Norwegian and the Barents seas, site of the Arctic convoys
Date	29 December 1941 – 9 January 1942
Location	Arctic Ocean
Result	Allied victory

Belligerents
Royal Navy; Merchant Navy; Panama; Soviet Union	Luftwaffe; Kriegsmarine

Commanders and leaders
	Hans-Jürgen Stumpff; Hermann Böhm

Strength
13 Merchant ships; 10 Escorts (in relays)	

Casualties and losses
Nil	Nil

Convoy QP 4 (29 December 1941 – 9 January 1942) was an Arctic convoy that sailed from Arkhangelsk in the Arctic north of the USSR. The convoy detoured to the north away from Norway and then turned towards the west for Iceland. The convoy had a close escort of minesweepers and trawlers and a cruiser escort of HMS Edinburgh and its destroyers HMS Echo and HMS Escapade.

On 8 January 1942, Edinburgh was ordered to depart the convoy and patrol to the south of the convoy route, where it "encountered nothing but bad weather". On 9 January the cruiser force sailed through a gale and on 10 January the temperature rose above freezing point for the first time for three weeks and the sun shone for the first time in a month. Edinburgh arrived at Scapa Flow on 11 January.

Eulima and San Ambrosio turned back from the convoy with fuel shortage but the rest arrived at Seyðisfjörður on the east coast of Iceland on 16 January with no losses due to German attacks and dispersed to other destinations.

Convoy QP 4 was one of a run of return convoys to Convoy QP 7, comprising 51 ships, that suffered no loss from German action, four ships turning back with weather damage, mechanical defects or fuel shortage. The Luftwaffe had great difficulty in finding Allied convoys and Generaladmiral Erich Raeder complained to Hitler about the lack of Luftwaffe reconnaissance.

== Background ==
=== Lend-lease ===
The Soviet leaders needed to replace the colossal losses of military equipment lost after the German invasion, especially when Soviet war industries were being moved out of the war zone and emphasised tank and aircraft deliveries. Machine tools, steel and aluminium was needed to replace indigenous resources lost in the invasion. The pressure on the civilian sector of the economy needed to be limited by food deliveries. The Soviets wanted to concentrate the resources that remained on items that the Soviet war economy that had the greatest comparative advantage over the German economy. Aluminium imports allowed aircraft production to a far greater extent than would have been possible using local sources and tank production was emphasised at the expense of lorries and food supplies were squeezed by reliance on what could be obtained from lend–lease. At the Moscow Conference, it was acknowledged that 1.5 million tons of shipping was needed to transport the supplies of the First Protocol and that Soviet sources could provide less than 10 per cent of the carrying capacity.

The British and Americans accepted that the onus was on them to find most of the shipping, despite their commitments in other theatres. The Prime Minister, Winston Churchill, made a commitment to send a convoy to the Arctic ports of the USSR every ten days and to deliver 1,200 tanks a month from July 1942 to January 1943, followed by 2,000 tanks and another 3,600 aircraft more than already promised. In November, the US president, Franklin D. Roosevelt, ordered Admiral Emory Land of the US Maritime Commission and then the head of the War Shipping Administration that deliveries to Russia should only be limited by 'insurmountable difficulties'. The first convoy was due at Murmansk around 12 October and the next convoy was to depart Iceland on 22 October. A motley of British, Allied and neutral shipping loaded with military stores and raw materials for the Soviet war effort would be assembled at Hvalfjörður in Iceland, convenient for ships from both sides of the Atlantic.

From Operation Dervish to Convoy PQ 11, the supplies to the USSR were mostly British, in British ships defended by the Royal Navy. A fighter force that could defend Murmansk was delivered that protected the Arctic ports and railways into the hinterland. Before September 1941 the British had dispatched 450 aircraft, 22,000 long tons (22,000 t) of rubber, 3,000,000 pairs of boots and stocks of tin, aluminium, jute, lead and wool. In September British and US representatives travelled to Moscow to study Soviet requirements and their ability to meet them. The representatives of the three countries drew up a protocol in October 1941 to last until June 1942. British supplied aircraft and tanks reinforced the Russian defences of Leningrad and Moscow from December 1941. The tanks and aircraft did not save Moscow but were important in the Soviet counter-offensive. The Luftwaffe was by then reduced to 600 operational aircraft on the Eastern Front, to an extent a consequence of Luftflotte 2 being sent to the Mediterranean against the British. Tanks and aircraft supplied by the British helped the Soviet counter-offensive force back the Germans further than might have been possible. In January and February 1941, deliveries of tanks and aircraft allowed the Russians to have a margin of safety should the Germans attempt to counter-attack.

=== Signals intelligence ===
==== Ultra ====
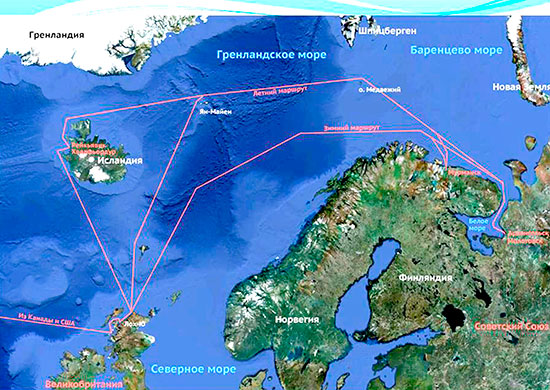
Russian map showing Arctic convoy routes from Britain and Iceland, past Norway to the Barents Sea and northern Russian ports

The British Government Code and Cypher School (GC&CS) based at Bletchley Park housed a small industry of code-breakers and traffic analysts. By June 1941, the German Enigma machine Home Waters (Heimish) settings used by surface ships and U-boats could quickly be read. On 1 February 1942, the Enigma machines used in U-boats in the Atlantic and Mediterranean were changed but German ships and the U-boats in Arctic waters continued with the older Heimish Home Hydra from 1942, Dolphin to the British). By mid-1941, British Y-stations were able to receive and read Luftwaffe W/T transmissions and give advance warning of Luftwaffe operations. In 1941, naval Headache personnel with receivers to eavesdrop on Luftwaffe wireless transmissions were embarked on warships.

=== B-Dienst ===
The rival German Beobachtungsdienst (B-Dienst, Observation Service) of the Kriegsmarine Marinenachrichtendienst (MND, Naval Intelligence Service) had broken several Admiralty codes and cyphers by 1939, which were used to help Kriegsmarine ships elude British forces and provide opportunities for surprise attacks. From June to August 1940, six British submarines were sunk in the Skaggerak using information gleaned from British wireless signals. In 1941, B-Dienst read signals from the Commander in Chief Western Approaches informing convoys of areas patrolled by U-boats, enabling the submarines to move into "safe" zones.

=== Arctic Ocean ===
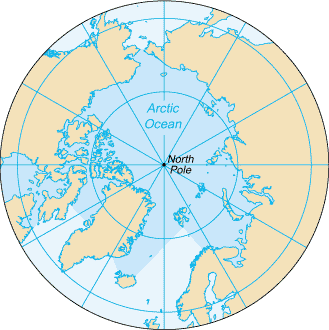
Diagram of the Arctic Ocean

Between Greenland and Norway are some of the most stormy waters of the world's oceans, 890 mi (1,440 km) of water under gales full of snow, sleet and hail. The cold Arctic water was met by the Gulf Stream, warm water from the Gulf of Mexico, which became the North Atlantic Drift. Arriving at the south-west of England the drift moves between Scotland and Iceland; north of Norway the drift splits. One stream bears north of Bear Island to Svalbard and a southern stream follows the coast of Murmansk into the Barents Sea. The mingling of cold Arctic water and warmer water of higher salinity generates thick banks of fog for convoys to hide in but the waters drastically reduced the effectiveness of ASDIC as U-boats moved in waters of differing temperatures and density.

In winter, polar ice can form as far south as 50 mi (80 km) off the North Cape and in summer it can recede to Svalbard. The area is in perpetual darkness in winter and permanent daylight in the summer and can make air reconnaissance almost impossible. Around the North Cape and in the Barents Sea the sea temperature rarely rises about 4 °C (39 °F) and a man in the water will die unless rescued immediately. The cold water and air makes spray freeze on the superstructure of ships, which has to be removed quickly to avoid the ship becoming top-heavy. Conditions in U-boats were, if anything, worse the boats having to submerge in warmer water to rid the superstructure of ice. Crewmen on watch were exposed to the elements, oil lost its viscosity and nuts froze and sheared off bolts. Heaters in the hull were too demanding of current and could not be run continuously.

== Prelude ==
=== Kriegsmarine ===
German naval forces in Norway were commanded by Hermann Böhm, the Kommandierender Admiral Norwegen. Two U-boats were based in Norway in July 1941, four in September, five in December and four in January 1942. Hitler contemplated establishing a unified command but decided against it. The German battleship Tirpitz arrived at Trondheim on 16 January, the first ship of a general move of surface ships to Norway. British convoys to Russia had received little attention since they averaged only eight ships each and the long Arctic winter nights negated even the limited Luftwaffe reconnaissance effort that was available.

=== Luftflotte 5 ===
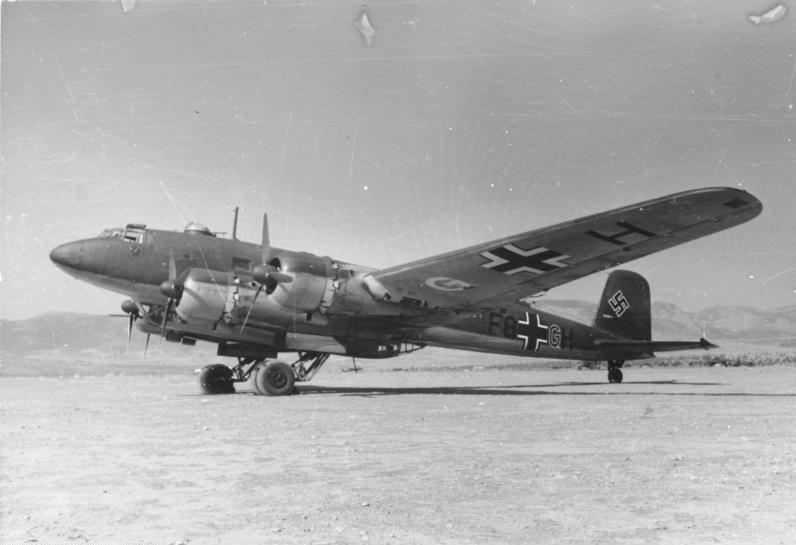
A Focke-Wulf Fw 200 Kondor of KG 40

In mid-1941, Luftflotte 5 (Air Fleet 5) had been re-organised for Operation Barbarossa with Luftgau Norwegen (Air Region Norway) headquartered in Oslo. Fliegerführer Stavanger (Air Commander Stavanger) the centre and north of Norway, Jagdfliegerführer Norwegen (Fighter Leader Norway) commanded the fighter force and Fliegerführer Kerkenes (Oberst [colonel] Andreas Nielsen) in the far north had airfields at Kirkenes and Banak. The Air Fleet had 180 aircraft, sixty of which were reserved for operations on the Karelian Front against the Red Army.

The distance from Banak to Arkhangelsk was 560 mi (900 km) and Fliegerführer Kerkenes had only ten Junkers Ju 88 bombers of Kampfgeschwader 30, thirty Junkers Ju 87 Stuka dive-bombers ten Messerschmitt Bf 109 fighters of Jagdgeschwader 77, five Messerschmitt Bf 110 heavy fighters of Zerstörergeschwader 76, ten reconnaissance aircraft and an anti-aircraft battalion. Sixty aircraft were far from adequate in such a climate and terrain where

...there is no favourable season for operations. (Earl Ziemke [1959] in Claasen [2001])

The emphasis of air operations changed from army support to anti-shipping operations only after March 1942, when Allied Arctic convoys becoming larger and more frequent coincided with the reinforcement of Norway with ships and aircraft and the less extreme climatic conditions of the Arctic summer.

=== Arctic convoys ===
A convoy was defined as at least one merchant ship sailing under the protection of at least one warship. At first the British had intended to run convoys to Russia on a forty-day cycle (the number of days between convoy departures) during the winter of 1941–1942 but this was shortened to a ten-day cycle. The round trip to Murmansk for warships was three weeks and each convoy needed a cruiser and two destroyers, which severely depleted the Home Fleet. Convoys left port and rendezvoused with the escorts at sea. A cruiser provided distant cover from a position to the west of Bear Island. Air support was limited to 330 Squadron and 269 Squadron of RAF Coastal Command from Iceland, with some help from anti-submarine patrols along the coast of Norway from RAF Sullom Voe in Shetland. Anti-submarine trawlers escorted the convoys on the first part of the outward voyage. Built for Arctic conditions, the trawlers were coal-burning ships and had sufficient endurance. The trawlers were commanded by their peacetime crews and captains with the rank of Skipper, Royal Naval Reserve (RNR). who were used to Arctic conditions, supplemented by anti-submarine specialists of the Royal Naval Volunteer Reserve (RNVR). British minesweepers based at Arkhangelsk met the convoys to join the escort for the remainder of the voyage.

== Voyage ==
73rd parallel north (interactive map)

As the Northern Dvina in the Arctic north of the Soviet Union, began to freeze the ships of Convoy QP 4 departed from Arkhangelsk on 29 December 1941, although originally scheduled for 20 December. The convoy followed two Soviet ide-breakers, Iosef Stalin and Lenin but took a long time to break through into the Barents Sea. Without the benefit of air reconnaissance the ice-breakers sailed into a dead end. Turning to the south-east the ice-breaker found thinner ice, took on coal from one of the convoyed ships and broke out of the Gorlo. As soon as the ships waiting at Murmansk received the news, HMS Edinburgh a Town-class cruiser and its escorts the E-class destroyers HMS Echo and HMS Escapade prepared tom sail to meet the two minesweepers sailing ahead of the convoy. The ships sailed from Murmansk on 4 January and stumbled upon HMS Hazard, a Halcyon-class minesweeper, escorting one of the ships from the convoy that had almost run out of fuel.

The cruiser and destroyers obtained a bearing of Convoy QP 4 and began to search for it. In the near-permanent darkness of the Arctic winter the search was ended when the moon unexpectedly shone and Edinburgh saw that it was in formation with the convoy as if the meeting had been planned. The convoy sailed northwards for the 73rd parallel north before turning towards the west, slightly south of the latitude of Bjørnøya (Bear Island) where German submarines had been reported. Eulima and San Ambrosio turned back with fuel shortage but the rest arrived at Seyðisfjörður on the east coast of Iceland on 16 January with no losses due to German attacks.

=== HMS Edinburgh ===
On 8 January, Edinburgh was ordered to depart the convoy and operate south of the convoy route but "encountered nothing but bad weather". On 9 January, the cruiser and its destroyers sailed into a gale so powerful that it did not raise big waves but caused spindrift (spray blown from cresting waves) that formed thick ice on the fore part of the ships. On 10 January the temperature rose above freezing point for the first time for three weeks and the sun shone for the first time in a month. Edinburgh arrived at Scapa Flow on 11 January.

== Aftermath ==
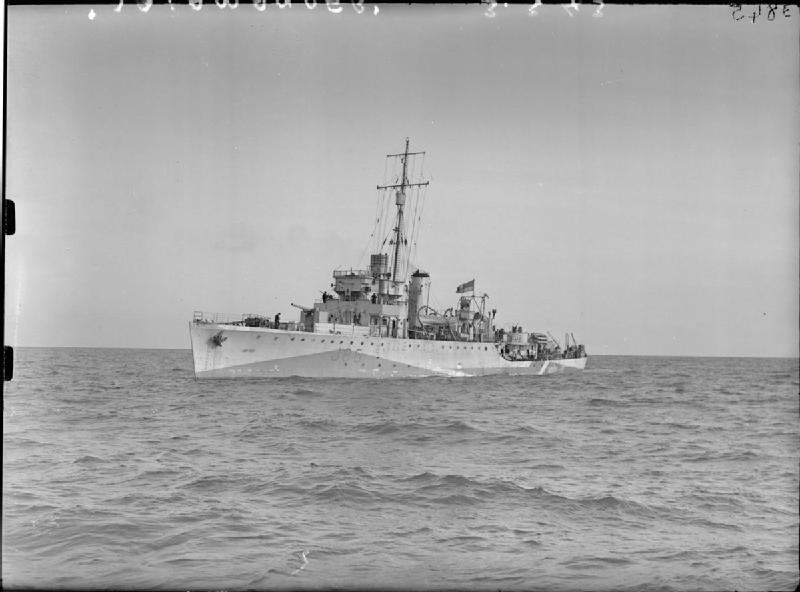
HMS Salamander, a Halcyon-class minesweeper

Convoy QP 4 was one of a run of return convoys to Convoy QP 7, comprising 51 ships, that suffered no loss from German action, although four ships turned back with weather damage, mechanical defects or fuel shortage. As the hours of daylight diminish during the Arctic winter until the Winter solstice (21 or 22 December in the northern hemisphere) the Luftwaffe had great difficulty in finding Allied convoys, which made attacks on Murmansk and the railway south more practical. Generaladmiral Erich Raeder knew that the conditions were favourable for Arctic convoys and also made German coastal traffic vulnerable to attack,

...the British realise the vital importance of the sea route off the Arctic coast for supply of the German forces.

That the British had not raided German shipping only served to increase apprehensions in the Seekriegsleitung (the German naval staff) who expected them imminently to begin; Raeder complained to Hitler about the lack of Luftwaffe reconnaissance.

== Allied order of battle ==
=== Convoyed ships ===
Merchant ships
Name	Year	Flag	GRT	P'n	Notes
Arkhangelsk–Seyðisfjörður (Iceland)–Scotland (29 December – 9 January)
SS Briarwood	1930	Merchant Navy	4,019	11	
SS Cape Corso	1929	Merchant Navy	3,807	22	
SS Cape Race	1930	Merchant Navy	3,807	43	
SS Cocle	1932	Panama	5,630	41	
SS Dan-y-Bryn	1940	Merchant Navy	5,117	32	
SS El Capitan	1917	Panama	5,255	12	
SS El Mirlo	1930	Merchant Navy	8,092	33	
SS Eulima	1937	Merchant Navy	6,207	—	Fuel shortage, returned to Archangelsk
SS San Ambrosio	1935	Merchant Navy	7,410	—	Fuel shortage, returned to Arkhangelsk
SS Sukhona	1940	Soviet Union	3,124	23	
SS Trehata	1928	Merchant Navy	4,817	42	
SS Trekieve	1932	Soviet Union	5,422	31	Vice-Convoy Commodore
SS Wanstead	1928	Merchant Navy	5,486	21	Convoy Commodore

=== Convoy formation ===
Order of sail (Note: Convoys had a standard formation of short columns, number 1 to the left in the direction of travel. Each position in the column was numbered; 11 was the first ship in column 1 and 12 was the second ship in the column; 21 was the first ship in column 2.)
column 1	column 2	column 3	column 4
11 Briarwood	21 Wanstead	31 Trekieve	41 Cocle
12 El Capitan	22 Cape Corso	32 Dan-y-Bryn	42 Trehata
13 —	23 Sukhona	33 El Mirlo	43 Cape Race

SS Eulima and SS San Ambrosio returned early and are not represented in the order of sail.

=== Escorts ===
Escort forces (in relays)
Name	Flag	Type	Notes
Eastern local escort (relays)
HMS Bramble	Royal Navy	Halcyon-class minesweeper	29 December – 5 January 1942
HMS Hebe	Royal Navy	Halcyon-class minesweeper	29 December – 5 January 1942
HMS Leda	Royal Navy	Halcyon-class minesweeper	29 December – 9 January 1942
HMS Seagull	Royal Navy	Halcyon-class minesweeper	29 December – 9 January 1942
HMS Speedy	Royal Navy	Halcyon-class minesweeper	29 December – 9 January 1942
HMT Bute	Royal Navy	Isles-class trawler	29 December – 9 January 1942
HMT Stella Capella	Royal Navy	ASW trawler	29 December – 9 January 1942
Ocean escort
HMS Edinburgh	Royal Navy	Town-class cruiser	5–9 January 1942
HMS Echo	Royal Navy	E-class destroyer	5–9 January 1942
HMS Escapade	Royal Navy	E-class destroyer	5–9 January 1942

== Bibliography ==
- Boog, H.; Rahn, W.; Stumpf, R.; Wegner, B. (2001). The Global War: Widening of the Conflict into a World War and the Shift of the Initiative 1941–1943. Germany in the Second World War. Vol. VI. Translated by Osers, E.; Brownjohn, J.; Crampton, P.; Willmot, L. (Eng trans. Oxford University Press, London ed.). Potsdam: Militärgeschichtliches Forschungsamt (Research Institute for Military History). ISBN 0-19-822888-0.
  - Rahn, W. "Part III. The War at Sea in the Atlantic and in the Arctic Ocean. III. The Conduct of the War in the Atlantic and the Coastal Area (b) The Third Phase, April–December 1941: The Extension of the Areas of Operations". In Boog et al. (2001).
- Boyd, Andrew (2024). Arms for Russia & the Naval War in the Arctic 1941–1945. Barnsley: Seaforth (Pen & Sword). ISBN 978-1-3990-3886-7.
- Claasen, A. R. A. (2001). Hitler's Northern War: The Luftwaffe's Ill-fated Campaign, 1940–1945. Lawrence, KS: University Press of Kansas. ISBN 0-7006-1050-2.
- Hancock, W. K.; Gowing, M. M. (1949). Hancock, W. K. (ed.). British War Economy. History of the Second World War, United Kingdom Civil Series. London: HMSO. OCLC 630191560.
- Hinsley, F. H. (1994) [1993]. British Intelligence in the Second World War: Its Influence on Strategy and Operations. History of the Second World War, United Kingdom Military Series (2nd rev. abr. ed.). London: HMSO. ISBN 978-0-11-630961-7.
- Jordan, Roger W. (2006) [1999]. The World's Merchant Fleets 1939: The Particulars and Wartime Fates of 6,000 Ships (2nd ed.). London: Chatham/Lionel Leventhal. ISBN 978-1-86176-293-1.
- Kahn, D. (1973) [1967]. The Codebreakers: The Story of Secret Writing (10th abr. Signet, Chicago ed.). New York: Macmillan. LCCN 63-16109. OCLC 78083316.
- Macksey, K. (2004) [2003]. The Searchers: Radio Intercept in two World Wars (Cassell Military Paperbacks ed.). London: Cassell. ISBN 978-0-304-36651-4.
- Paterson, Lawrence (2016). Steel and Ice: The U-boat Battle in the Arctic and Black Sea 1941–45. Stroud: The History Press. ISBN 978-1-59114-258-4.
- Roskill, S. W. (1957) [1954]. Butler, J. R. M. (ed.). The War at Sea 1939–1945: The Defensive. History of the Second World War United Kingdom Military Series. Vol. I (4th impr. ed.). London: HMSO. OCLC 881709135. Archived from the original on 27 February 2022.
- Ruegg, R.; Hague, A. (1993) [1992]. Convoys to Russia: Allied Convoys and Naval Surface Operations in Arctic Waters 1941–1945 (2nd rev. enl. ed.). Kendal: World Ship Society. ISBN 0-905617-66-5.
- Woodman, Richard (1994). Arctic Convoys 1941–1945 (hbk. ed.). London: John Murray. ISBN 0-7195-5079-3.
- Woodman, Richard (2004) [1994]. Arctic Convoys 1941–1945. London: John Murray. ISBN 978-0-7195-5752-1.
- Ziemke, Earl F. (1959). The German Northern Theatre of Operations, 1940–1945. Washington, DC: Headquarters, United States Department of the Army. OCLC 610363660. 20-271.
