= HMS Bramble (J11) =

Minesweeper of the Royal Navy

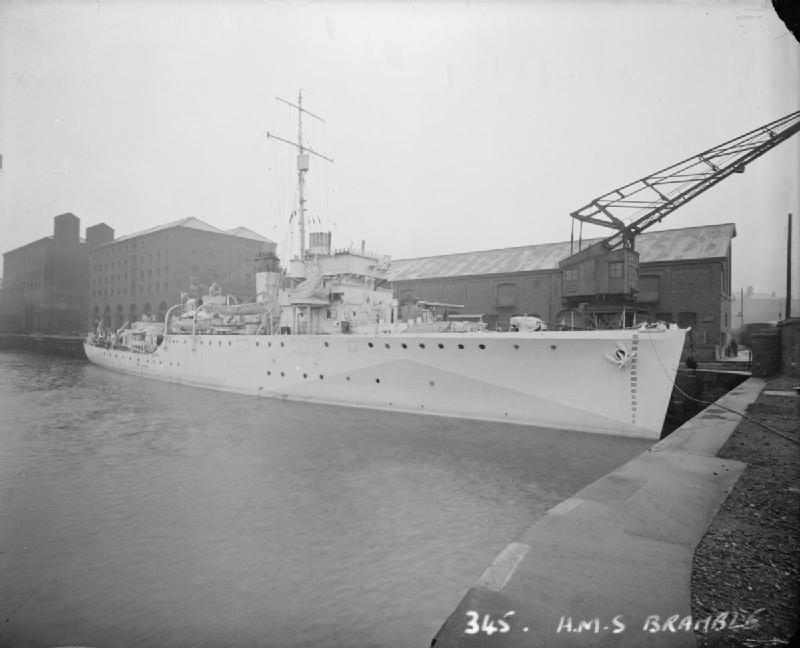
- HMS Bramble, April 1942

History

United Kingdom
- Name: HMS Bramble
- Ordered: 11 August 1937
- Builder: HM Dockyard, Devonport
- Laid down: 22 November 1937
- Launched: 12 July 1938
- Commissioned: 22 June 1939
- Honours and awards: Arctic 1941–42
- Fate: Sunk, 31 December 1942
- Badge: On a Field White, a Bramble, slipped and leaved Proper

General characteristics
- Class & type: Halcyon-class minesweeper
- Displacement: 875 long tons (889 t) standard; 1,350 long tons (1,372 t) full load
- Length: 245 ft 9 in (74.90 m) o/a
- Beam: 33 ft 6 in (10.21 m)
- Draught: 9 ft (2.7 m)
- Propulsion: 2 × Admiralty 3-drum water-tube boilers; Parsons steam turbines; 2,000 shp (1,500 kW) on 2 shafts
- Speed: 16.5 knots (30.6 km/h; 19.0 mph)
- Range: 7,200 nmi (13,300 km; 8,300 mi) at 10 kn (19 km/h; 12 mph)
- Complement: 121
- Armament: As completed: 2 × QF 4-inch Mk.V (L/45 102 mm) guns, single mounts HA Mk.III; 4 × .5-inch Mk.III (12.7 mm) Vickers machine guns, quad mount HA Mk.I; 4 × .303-inch (7.7 mm) Lewis machine-guns; 4 × depth charge throwers; 2 × depth charge rails

HMS Bramble was a Halcyon-class minesweeper (officially, "fleet minesweeping sloop") of the Royal Navy, which was commissioned in 1939, just before the Second World War. During the war she served as a minesweeper in the North Sea, and then on Russian convoys until sunk in the Battle of the Barents Sea on 31 December 1942 by the German cruiser Admiral Hipper and the destroyer Friedrich Eckoldt.

== Service history ==
The ship was ordered on 11 August 1937 from HM Dockyard Devonport, with engines supplied by Barclay Curle. She was laid down on 22 November 1937, and launched on 12 July 1938. After sea trials in July 1939 Bramble was assigned to the 1st Minesweeping Flotilla at Portland Harbour, sailing with the Flotilla to Scapa Flow in August. She served as a minesweeper in the North Sea until February 1941, when she transferred to Harwich for operations in the Thames Estuary.

In April 1941 she was transferred to Western Approaches Command for Atlantic convoy escort duty, and attached to the 3rd Escort Group. Between 22 July 1941 and 16 November 1942 she was commanded by Captain John Crombie. In October she was detached to serve on the Russian convoys, and joined Convoy PQ 2 sailing to Arkhangelsk, where she remained carrying out local minesweeping and patrol duties, as well as escorting in- and out-bound convoys. She returned to the UK in January 1942 to be refitted at a yard in Sunderland. She returned to convoy duty in April, returning to Russia with Convoy PQ 15. She served there until October, when she returned to the UK to be repaired at a shipyard in the Humber.

=== Sinking ===
On 22 December 1942 Bramble sailed with Convoy JW 51B from Loch Ewe. The convoy was sighted by the U-354 on 30 December and the German cruisers Admiral Hipper and Lützow, accompanied by six destroyers, sailed from Altenfjord to intercept them in Operation Regenbogen, leading to the Battle of the Barents Sea. On 31 December Bramble, which had been detached to search for stragglers, was returning to the convoy when she encountered Admiral Hipper and three destroyers. Hipper promptly opened fire with her 8 in (200 mm) guns. Bramble returned fire but was overwhelmed and finally sunk with all hands by the destroyer Friedrich Eckoldt at 73°18′N 30°06′E.

== Convoys ==
Bramble served on the following convoys between the UK and Russia, prefixed PQ, with returning convoys prefixed QP:

Convoy	Dates
Convoy PQ 2	17–30 October 1941
Convoy QP 2	3–5 November 1941
Convoy PQ 3	20–22 November 1941
Convoy QP 3	27–28 November 1941
Convoy PQ 5	7–13 December 1941
Convoy QP 4	29 December 1941 – 5 January 1942
Convoy QP 6	25–28 January 1942
Convoy PQ 15	26 April – 5 May 1942
Convoy QP 12	21–23 May 1942
Convoy PQ 16	28–30 May 1942
Convoy QP 13	26–28 June 1942
Convoy QP 14	13–25 September 1942
Convoy JW 51B	22–31 December 1942
