= General admiral =

General officer rank in some nation's navy

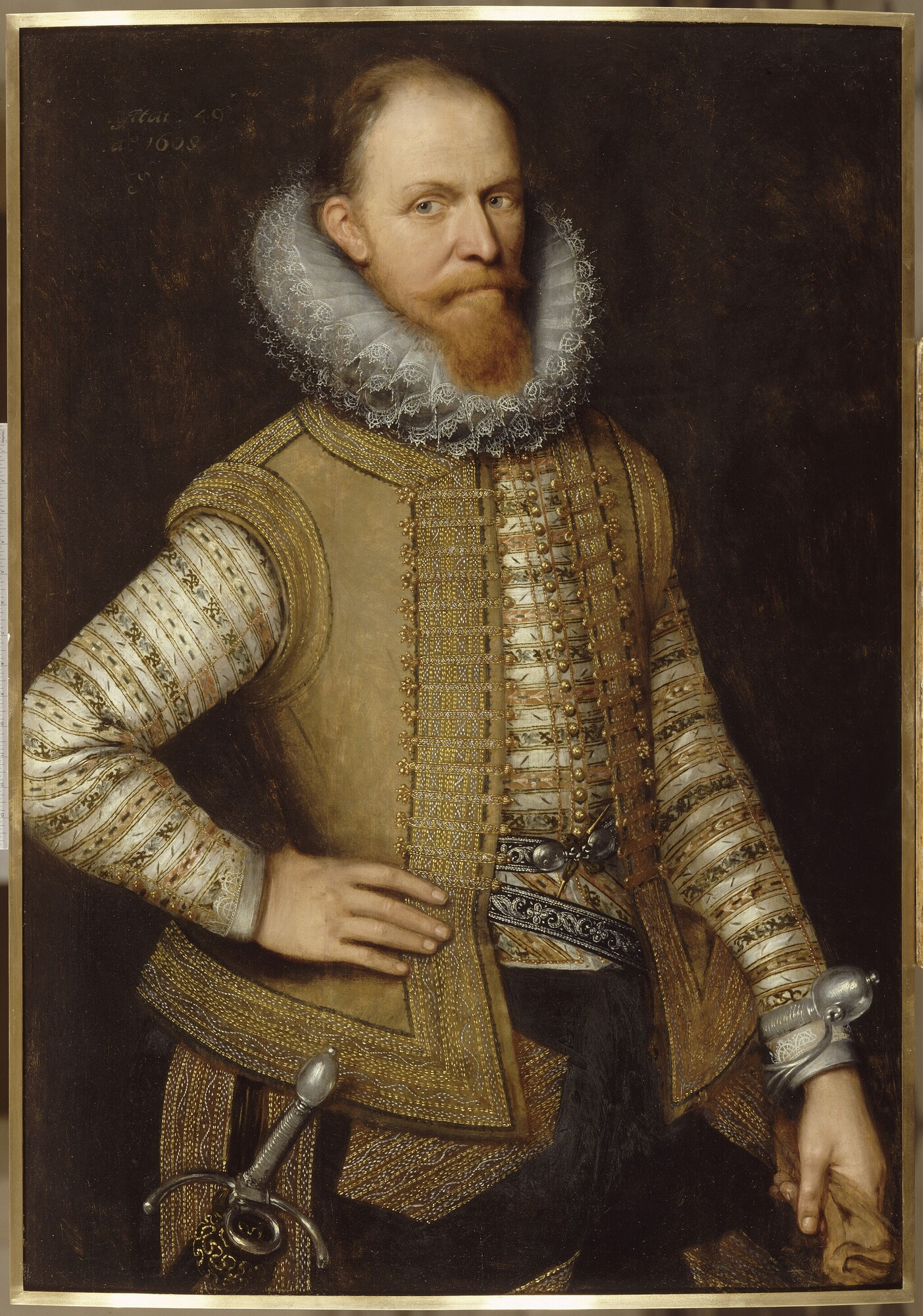
Maurits van Oranje, first Generaladmiral in history

General admiral or admiral general was first a European naval rank. First a Dutch rank, Its historic origin is a title high military or naval dignitaries of early modern Europe sometimes held, for example the (nominal) commander-in-chief of the Dutch Republic's navy (usually the Prince of Orange).

Aside from the Dutch Republic, the rank was also in use in Denmark, Germany, Russia, Portugal, Spain and Sweden.

== Denmark ==
Generaladmiral rank flag

In Denmark, the General Admiral (Danish: Generaladmiral) was the term for the commander-in-chief of the Dano-Norwegian navy. The rank below the General Admiral was Lieutenant General Admiral (Danish: Generaladmiralløjtnant).

Portrait	Name (birth–death)	Term of office			Ref.
Portrait	Name (birth–death)	Appointed	Dismissed	Time in office	Ref.
	Cort Adeler (1622–1675)	1665	5 November 1675 †	9–10 years	
	Cornelis Tromp (1629–1691)	8 May 1676	1678	1–2 years	
	Jens Juel (1631–1700)	21 October 1699	17 April 1700	178 days	
	Ulrik Christian Gyldenløve, Count of Samsø (1678–1719)	4 May 1700	8 December 1719 †	19 years, 235 days	

== Germany ==
General admiral Generaladmiral
- Generaladmiral rank flag

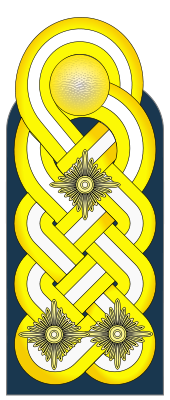
- Shoulder board and sleeve
- Country: Nazi Germany
- Service branch: Kriegsmarine
- Abbreviation: GenAdm
- Rank group: Flag officer
- Formation: 1936
- Abolished: 1945
- Next higher rank: Großadmiral
- Next lower rank: Admiral
- Equivalent ranks: Generaloberst

In the German Kriegsmarine of the Second World War, Generaladmiral was a rank senior to an Admiral, but junior to a Großadmiral. Generaladmiral was a four-star admiral rank, equivalent to a full admiral in the British and American navies. In the traditional German ranking system until World War II, an admiral was equivalent to a British or American vice admiral.

The sleeve insignia for a Generaladmiral was the same as that of a regular admiral, being a thick rank stripe below three regular stripes (Kolbenringe in German naval parlance). Generaladmirals wore a third pip on their shoulder boards to differentiate them from regular admirals. The German Army and Air Force equivalent of Generaladmiral was the rank colonel general (Generaloberst).

In 1943, a directive was issued that should the Oberbefehlshaber der Kriegsmarine ("commander of the navy") hold the rank of Generaladmiral, he would wear the sleeve insignia of a grand admiral, but the shoulder boards of a Generaladmiral.

A similar practice was used in the German Army, allowing colonel generals to wear four pips on the shoulder board when engaged in duties befitting a field marshal.

The rank of Generaladmiral was first given to the future grand admiral Erich Raeder on 20 April 1936.

=== List ===
Other holders of the rank were:

- Conrad Albrecht (1 April 1939)
- Alfred Saalwächter (1 January 1940)
- Rolf Carls (19 July 1940)
- Hermann Boehm (1 April 1941)
- Karl Witzell (1 April 1941)
- Otto Schultze (31 August 1942)
- Wilhelm Marschall (1 February 1943)
- Otto Schniewind (1 March 1944)
- Walter Warzecha (1 March 1944)
- Oskar Kummetz (16 September 1944)
- Hans-Georg von Friedeburg (1 May 1945)

Notably, Karl Dönitz was promoted to grand admiral without becoming a Generaladmiral first.

junior rank Admiral	(Ranks Kriegsmarine); Generaladmiral; Generaloberst	senior rank Großadmiral

== Portugal ==
Almirante-general was the highest rank in the Portuguese Navy, from 1808 to 1812 and again, from 1892 to 1910. It was the naval equivalent to the rank of marechal-general ("general field marshal") of the Portuguese Army.

The rank was initially introduced in 1808, to be assigned to the commander-in-chief of the navy. The almirante-general had similar functions to those of the former capitão-general da armada (captain general of the navy) which had been extinguished in 1796 and whose functions passed to the Board of the Admiralty. The rank was only given to Infante Pedro Carlos de Bragança, being extinguished when he died in 1812.

In 1892, the almirante-general rank was reintroduced as a mere ceremonial rank to be held by the King of Portugal in his constitutional function of supreme commander of the navy. As supreme commander of the army, the king also held the ceremonial rank of marechal-general. The last holder of the rank was King Manuel II.

== Russia ==
Rank insignia 1904–1917

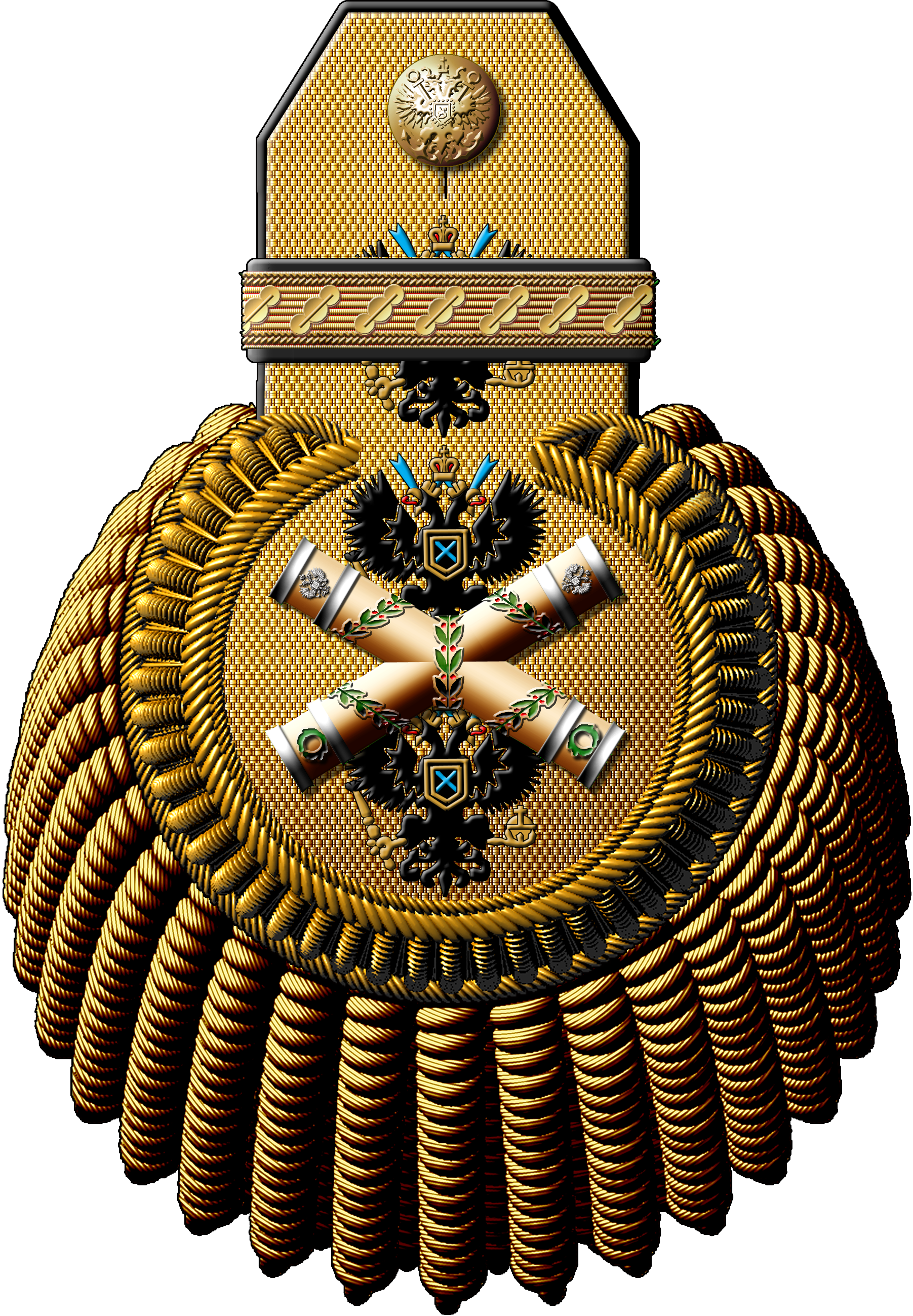
Epaulette

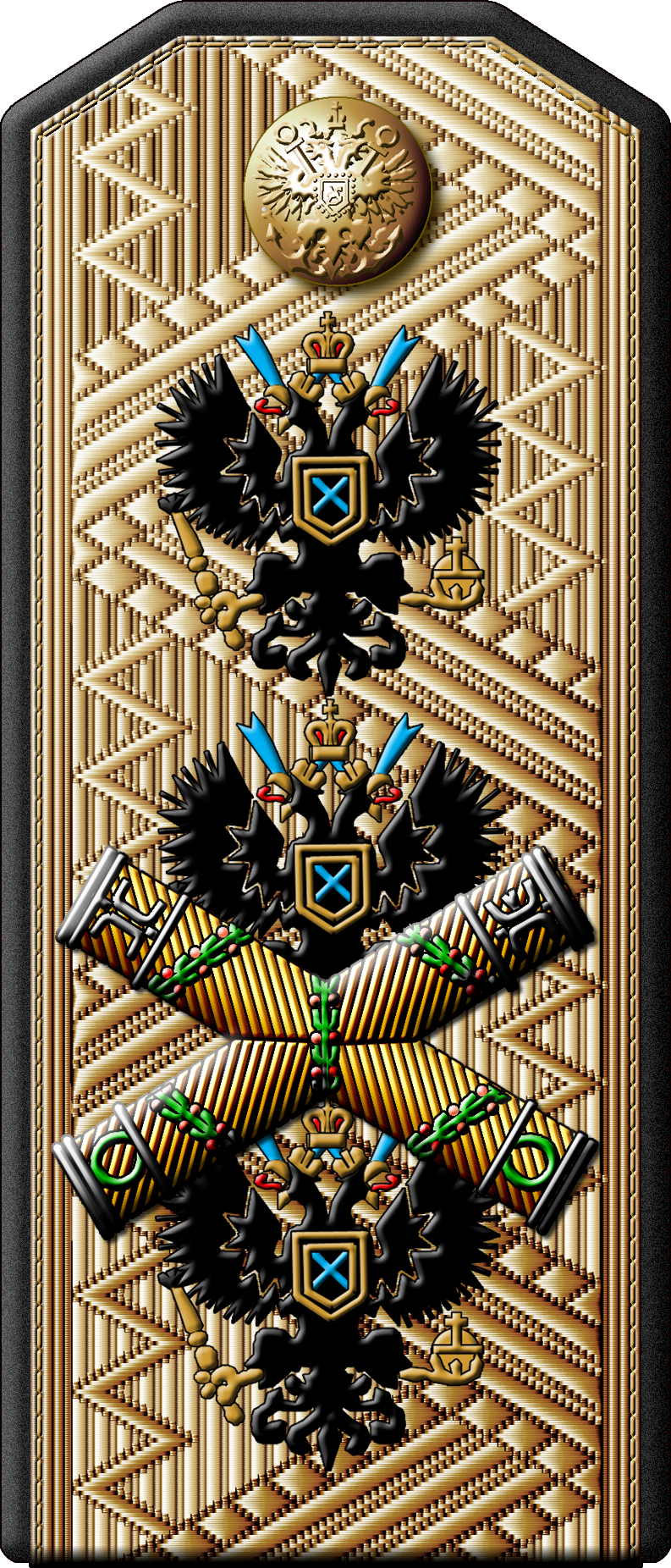
Shoulder board

General-admiral

General-admiral (Russian: генера́л-адмира́л) was the highest rank of the Imperial Russian Navy as established by the Table of Ranks and equivalent to field marshal. This was purely an honorific rank and for much of its existence, it was awarded only to a person on active duty, usually for the head of the naval department, and typically a descendant of the Romanov royal family.

There were only ten holders of this rank:

- Count Franz Lefort (1695);
- Count Fedor Golovin, first Russian chancellor (1700);
- Count Fyodor Matveyevich Apraksin (1708);
- Count Andrei Ivanovich Osterman or Heinrich Johann Friedrich Ostermann (1740; dismissed 1741);
- Prince Mikhail Golitsyn (1756);
- Grand Duke (Emperor since 1796) Pavel Petrovich (1762);
- Count Alexei Grigoryevich Orlov (1770);
- Count Ivan Chernyshyov (1796);
- Grand Duke Constantine Nikolayevich (1831);
- Grand Duke Alexei Alexandrovich (1883).

The general admiral rank was abolished with the fall of the Empire and was not revived when rank distinctions were reintroduced during 1935–40. The rank of admiral of the fleet of the Soviet Union can be considered as a modern equivalent.

== Spain ==
Almirante general is a rank in the Spanish Navy that is above an admiral, but subordinate to a captain general.

== Sweden ==
Generalamiral is the highest rank of admiral that has existed in the Swedish Navy, created by Charles XI in the name of Admiral General (Amiralgeneral). Gustav III revived the rank in 1780, and the same year issued instructions for the General Admiral, which alone was the King in Council's responsible for naval existence and betterment. The rank has been held by Henrik af Trolle (1780–84), Carl August Ehrensvärd (1792–94), Johan af Puke (1812), Victor von Stedingk (1818) and Rudolf Cederström (1823–28).

== In fiction ==
"Admiral General" Aladeen from The Dictator (2012) is a parody of leaders who appoint themselves grandiose military ranks.

== Bibliography ==
- Garde, Hans Georg (1861). Den dansk-norske sømagts historie 1535-1700 (in Danish). Copenhagen: B. Lunos bogtrykkeri.
- Topsøe-Jensen, T.A.; Marquard, Emil, eds. (1935a). Officerer i Den dansk-norske Søetat 1660-1814 og Den danske Søetat 1814-1932 (in Danish). Vol. I. Copenhagen: Pedersen & Lefevre.
