= Erich Raeder =

German admiral (1876–1960)

- Raeder in 1940

Chief of the German Navy High Command
- In office 1 June 1935 – 30 January 1943
- Deputy: Rolf Carls
- Preceded by: Himself (as Head of the Naval Command)
- Succeeded by: Karl Dönitz

Head of the German Naval Command
- In office 1 October 1928 – 1 June 1935
- Preceded by: Hans Zenker
- Succeeded by: Himself (as Oberbefehlshaber der Marine)

Personal details
- Born: Erich Johann Albert Raeder; 24 April 1876 Wandsbek, Schleswig-Holstein, Prussia, Germany
- Died: 6 November 1960 (aged 84) Kiel, Schleswig-Holstein, West Germany
- Resting place: Nordfriedhof cemetery, Kiel
- Spouse: Erika Moller
- Children: 4
- Parents: Hans Friedrich Eduard Raeder (father); Gertrud Wilhelmine Margaretha (mother)

Military service
- Allegiance: German Empire; Weimar Republic; Nazi Germany
- Branch: Imperial German Navy; Reichsmarine; Kriegsmarine
- Service years: 1894–1943
- Rank: Großadmiral
- Commands: SMS Cöln
- Battles/wars: World War I; Raid on Yarmouth; Raid on Hartlepool; Battle of Dogger Bank; Bombardment of Lowestoft; Battle of Jutland; Action of 19 August 1916; World War II
- Awards: See below
- Criminal information
- Status: Deceased
- Convictions: Conspiracy to commit crimes against peace; Crimes of aggression; War crimes
- Trial: Nuremberg trials
- Penalty: Life imprisonment

Erich Johann Albert Raeder ([ˈeːʁɪç ˈʁɛːdɐ]; 24 April 1876 – 6 November 1960) was a German admiral who played a major role in the naval history of World War II and was convicted of war crimes after the war. He attained the highest possible naval rank, that of grand admiral, in 1939. Raeder led the Kriegsmarine for the first half of the war; he resigned in January 1943 and was replaced by Karl Dönitz. At the Nuremberg trials he was sentenced to life imprisonment but was released early owing to failing health in 1955.

== Early years ==
Raeder was born into a middle-class Protestant family in Wandsbek in the Prussian province of Schleswig-Holstein in the German Empire. His father was a headmaster.

Raeder idolised his father Hans Raeder, who as a teacher and a father was noted for his marked authoritarian views, and who impressed upon his son the values of hard work, thrift, religion and discipline – all of which Raeder later preached throughout his life. Hans Raeder also taught his children to support the existing government of alleged "non-political" experts led by Bismarck who were said to stand "above politics" and were alleged to only do what was best for Germany. In the same way, Hans Raeder warned his children that if Germany were to become a democracy, that would be a disaster as it would mean government by men "playing politics"-doing what was only best for their petty sectarian interests instead of the nation.

Like many other middle-class Germans of his time, Hans Raeder strongly disliked the Social Democrats, whom he accused of playing "party politics" in the Reichstag by promoting working class interests instead of thinking about the national good, a stance that his son also adopted. Throughout his entire life, Raeder claimed that he was apolitisch (someone who was "above politics", i.e. only thought about the good of the nation instead of his party), and as an "apolitical" officer, Raeder thus maintained that his support for sea power was based upon objective consideration of the national good.

== Naval career until World War II ==
=== Imperial German Navy ===
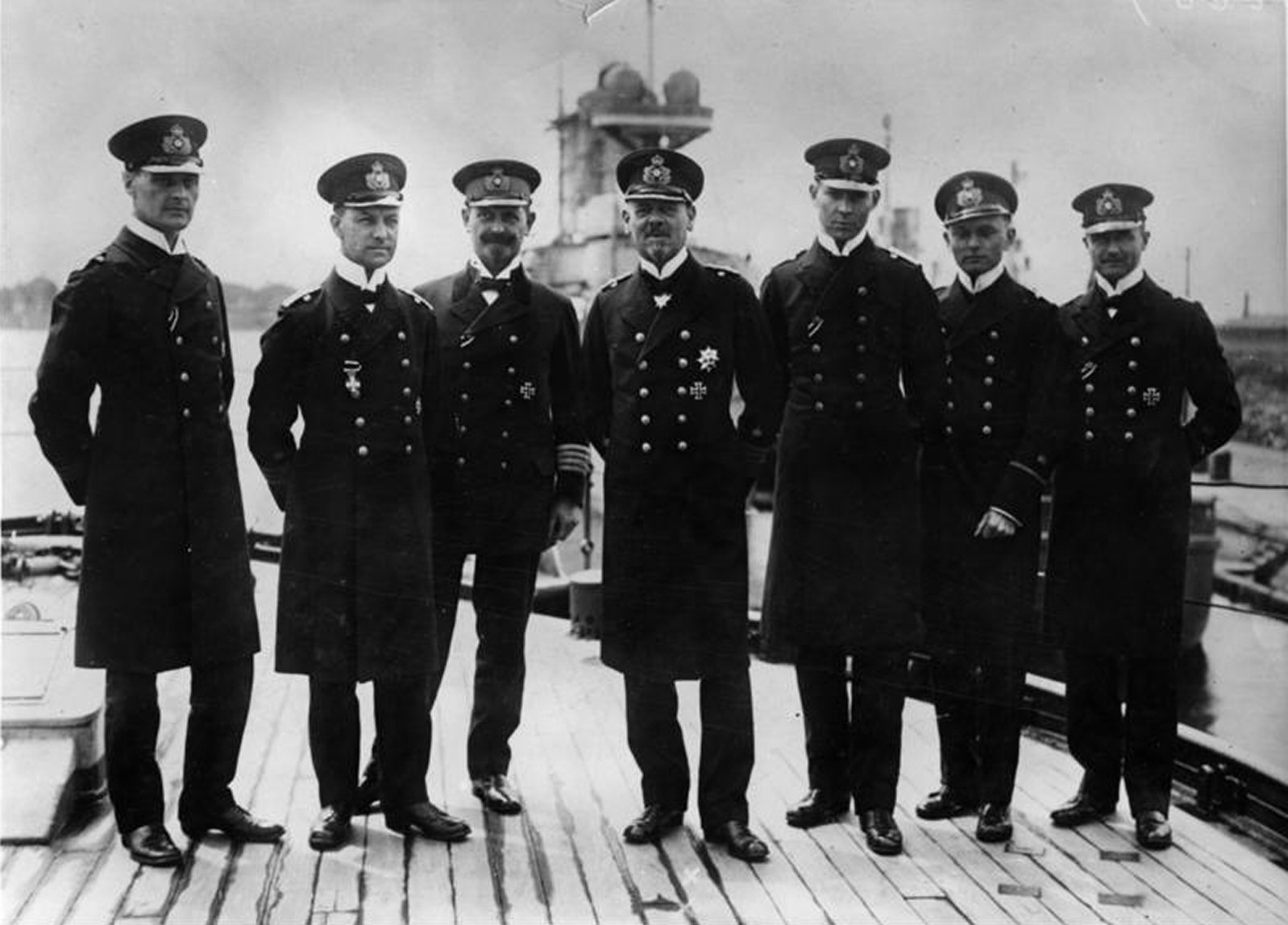
Erich Raeder (second from left) and the staff of Vice Admiral Franz von Hipper (center), 1916

Raeder joined the Kaiserliche Marine (Imperial Navy) in 1894 and rapidly rose in rank, becoming chief of staff for Franz von Hipper in 1912. Raeder's rise up the ranks was due mostly to his intelligence and hard work though from 1901 to 1903 Raeder served on the staff of Prince Heinrich of Prussia, and gained a powerful patron in the process. Owing to his cold and distant personality, Raeder was a man whom even his friends often admitted to knowing very little about. The dominating figure of the Navy was Admiral Alfred von Tirpitz, the autocratic State Secretary of the Navy. Tirpitz's preferred means of obtaining "world power status" was through his Risikotheorie (risk theory) where Germany would build a Risikoflotte (Risk Fleet) that would make it too dangerous for Britain to risk a war with Germany, and thereby alter the international balance of power decisively in the Reich's favor. Tirpitz transformed the Navy from the small coastal defense force of 1897 into the mighty High Seas Fleet of 1914.

In 1904, Raeder, who spoke fluent Russian, was sent to the Far East as an observer of the Russo-Japanese War. Starting in 1905, Raeder worked in the public relations section of the Navy, where he first met Tirpitz and began his introduction to politics by briefing journalists to run articles promoting the Seemachtideologie and meeting politicians who held seats in the Reichstag in order to convert them to the Seemachtideologie. Working closely with Tirpitz, Raeder was heavily involved in the lobbying the Reichstag to pass the Third Navy Law of 1906 which committed Germany to building "all big gun battleships" to compete with the new British Dreadnought class in the Anglo-German naval race that had only begun at the start of the 20th century.

Raeder was the captain of Kaiser Wilhelm II's private yacht in the years leading up to World War I. In itself, this was not a rewarding post, but often people in this post were quickly promoted afterwards.

=== World War I ===
Raeder served as Hipper's chief of staff during World War I, as well as in combat posts. He took part in the Battle of Dogger Bank in 1915 and in the Battle of Jutland in 1916. Raeder later described Hipper as an admiral who "hated paperwork"; accordingly, Hipper delegated considerable power to Raeder, who thus enjoyed more influence than his position as chief of staff would suggest.

During and after World War I the German navy was divided into two schools of thought. One, led by Admiral Alfred von Tirpitz (1849–1930), consisted of avid followers of the teachings of the American historian Alfred Thayer Mahan (1840–1914) and believed in building a "balanced fleet" centered around the battleship that would seek out and win a decisive battle of annihilation (Entscheidungsschlacht) against the Royal Navy in the event of war. The other school, led by Commander Wolfgang Wegener (1875–1956), argued that because of superior British shipbuilding capacity Germany could never hope to build a "balanced fleet" capable of winning an Entscheidungsschlacht, and so the best use of German naval strength was to build a fleet of cruisers and submarines that would wage a guerre de course (commerce raiding against an enemy's merchant shipping). After reading all three of Wegener's papers setting out his ideas, Admiral Hipper decided to submit them to the Admiralty in Berlin, but changed his mind after reading a paper by Raeder attacking the Wegener thesis as flawed. This marked the beginning of a long feud between Raeder and Wegener, with Wegener claiming that his former friend Raeder was jealous of what Wegener insisted were his superior ideas.

In May 1916 Raeder played a major role planning a raid by Hipper's battlecruisers that aimed to lure out the British battlecruiser force which would then be destroyed by the main High Seas Fleet. This raid turned into the Battle of Jutland. Raeder played a prominent role, and was forced midway through the battle to transfer from SMS Lützow to SMS Moltke as a result of damage to Hipper's flagship.

As chief of staff to Admiral Hipper he was closely involved in a plan of Hipper's for a German battlecruiser squadron to sail across the Atlantic and sweep through the waters off Canada down to the West Indies and on to South America to sink the British cruisers operating in those waters, and thereby force the British to redeploy a substantial part of the Home Fleet to the New World. Though Hipper's plans were rejected as far too risky, they significantly influenced Raeder's later thinking.

On 14 October 1918, Raeder received a major promotion with appointment as deputy to Admiral Paul Behncke, the Naval State Secretary. Raeder had doubts about submarines, but he spent the last weeks of the war working to achieve the Scheer Programme of building 450 U-boats.

On 28 October 1918 the Imperial German fleet at Kiel mutinied when some of the ships' crews refused to sail out for the a final battle against the British Grand Fleet that the Admiralty had ordered without the knowledge or approval of the German government. Raeder played a major role in attempting to crush the mutiny.

== Weimar Republic ==
Raeder's two younger brothers were killed in action in the First World War, and in 1919 his first marriage, which had been under heavy strain due to war-related stress, ended in divorce. For the puritanical Raeder, the divorce was a huge personal disgrace, and for the rest of his life he always denied his first marriage. The years 1918–1919 were some of the most troubled in his life.

=== High Seas Fleet mutiny ===
In the winter of 1918–19, Raeder was closely involved in the efforts of the naval officer corps, strongly backed by the Defense Minister Gustav Noske to disband the workers' and soldiers' councils established after the Kiel mutiny. Noske was a Majority Social Democrat with firm "law and order" views. During this period, Raeder served as the liaison between the naval officer corps and Noske, and it was Raeder who suggested to Noske on 11 January 1919 that Adolf von Trotha be appointed commander-in-chief of the Navy. Tirpitz's attacks on the Emperor's leadership during the war had caused a split in the officer corps between the followers of "the Master" and the Kaiser, and Raeder saw Trotha as the only officer acceptable to both factions. Noske in turn asked the Navy for volunteers for the Freikorps to crush uprisings from the Communists. The Navy contributed two brigades to the Freikorps. Under the Weimar Republic, the military considered itself überparteilich (above party), which did not mean political neutrality as implied. The military argued that there were two types of "politics": parteipolitisch (party politics) which was the responsibility of the politicians, and staatspolitisch (state politics) which was the responsibility of the military. Staatspolitisch concerned Germany's "eternal" interests and the "historic mission" of winning world power, which was to be pursued regardless of what the politicians or the people wanted.

=== Kapp putsch ===
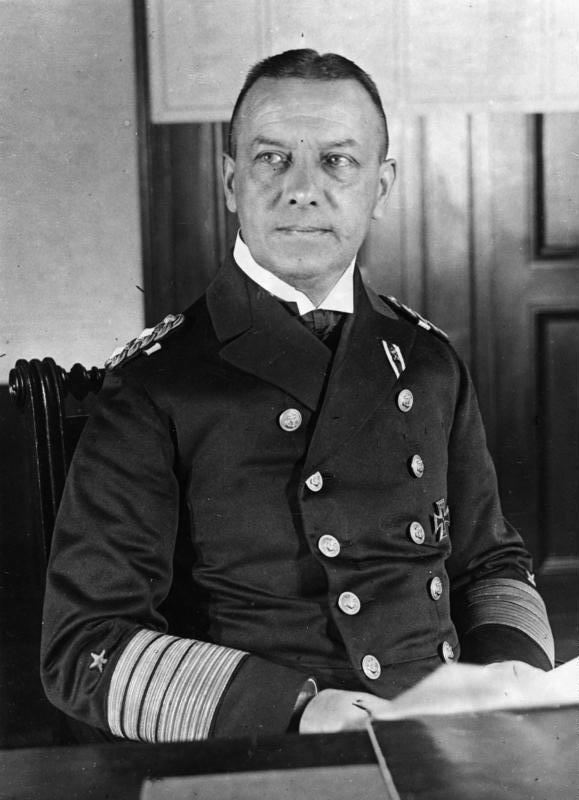
Raeder in 1928

After the war, in 1920, Raeder was involved in the failed Kapp Putsch when, together with almost the entire naval officer corps, he declared himself openly for the "government" of Wolfgang Kapp against the leaders of the Weimar Republic. In the summer of 1920 Raeder married his second wife, with whom he later had one son.

After the failure of the Kapp Putsch he was marginalized in the Navy, being transferred to the Naval Archives, where for two years he played a leading role in writing the official history of the Navy in World War I. After this, Raeder resumed his steady rise in the navy hierarchy, becoming Vizeadmiral (vice admiral) in 1925.

=== Commander-in-chief ===
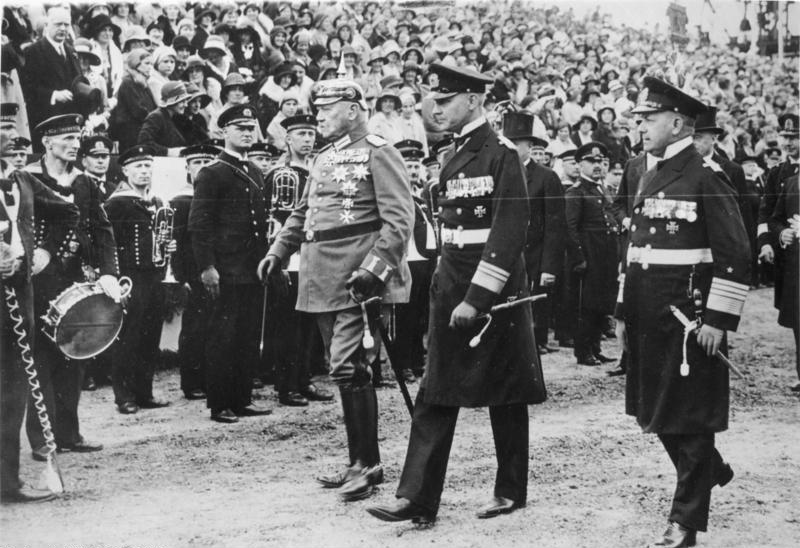
Raeder and Paul von Hindenburg in Kiel, 1931

On 1 October 1928, Raeder was promoted to admiral and made chief of the Naval Command (Chef der Marineleitung) of the Reichsmarine, the Weimar Republic Navy. On 1 June 1935, the Reichsmarine was renamed the Kriegsmarine and Raeder became its commander-in-chief with the title of Oberbefehlshaber der Kriegsmarine. On 20 April 1936, Raeder was promoted to the new rank of Generaladmiral and granted the rank and authority of a Reichsminister but without the formal title. On 30 January 1937, Hitler conferred the Golden Party Badge on Raeder, thereby enrolling him in the Party (membership number 3,805,228).

== World War II ==
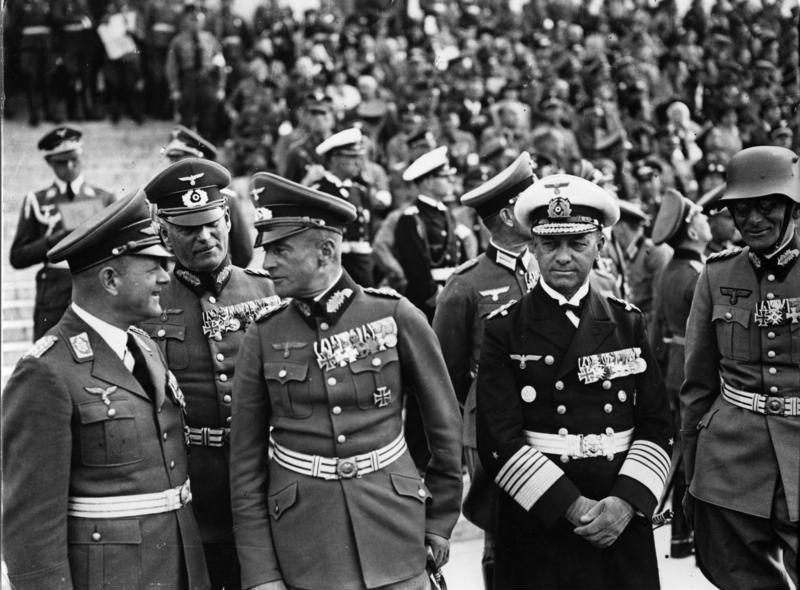
Erhard Milch, Wilhelm Keitel, Walther von Brauchitsch, Raeder and Maximilian von Weichs at the 1938 Nuremberg Rally

Raeder believed the navy was unprepared for the start of World War II by at least five years. The surface fleet was inadequate to fight the Royal Navy and instead adopted a strategy of convoy raiding. Raeder wanted the Kriegsmarine to play an active part because he feared the budget would be cut after the war. The smaller ships were dispersed around the world in order to force the Royal Navy to disperse their ships to combat them, while the battleships would carry out raids in the North Sea, with a view towards gradually reducing the Royal Navy's strength at home.

Raeder was unhappy with the outcome of the Battle of the River Plate and believed that Hans Langsdorff should not have scuttled the ship, but instead sailed out to engage the Royal Navy. Fleet commander Hermann Boehm was held responsible and was sacked by Raeder, who also issued orders that ships were to fight until the last shell and either win or sink with their flags flying.

The Allies were using Norwegian airfields to transfer aircraft to the Finns fighting against the Soviets in the Winter War, as well as mining Norwegian waters, and the Germans were alarmed by these developments. If the Allies were to use Norwegian naval bases or successfully mine Norwegian waters, they could cut off Germany's vital iron ore imports from Sweden and tighten the blockade of Germany. The Allies had made plans to invade Norway and Sweden in order to cut off those iron ore shipments. Admiral Rolf Carls, commander of the Kriegsmarine in the Baltic Sea region, proposed the invasion of Norway to Raeder in September 1939. Raeder briefed Hitler on the idea in October, but planning did not begin until December 1939. The operation was in low-priority planning until the Altmark incident in February 1940, during which a German tanker carrying 300 Allied prisoners in then-neutral Norwegian waters was boarded by sailors from a Royal Navy destroyer and the prisoners were freed. After this, plans for the Norwegian invasion took on a new sense of urgency. The invasion proved costly for the Kriegsmarine, which lost a heavy cruiser, two of its six light cruisers, 10 of its 20 destroyers and six U-boats. In addition, almost all of the other capital ships were damaged and required dockyard repairs, and for a time the German surface fleet had only three light cruisers and four destroyers operational in the aftermath of the Norwegian campaign.

The swift victory over France allowed the Kriegsmarine to base itself in ports on France's west coast. This was strategically important as German warships would no longer have to navigate through the dangerous English Channel in order to return to friendly ports, as well as allow them to range farther out into the Atlantic to attack convoys. With the surrender of France, Raeder saw the opportunity to greatly enhance the navy's power by confiscating the ships of the French Navy and manning them with his crews. Hitler however, vetoed this idea, afraid that doing so would push the French navy to join the Royal Navy. British fears of Raeder's plan resulted in the Attack on Mers-el-Kébir, in which the Royal Navy attacked the French navy despite being at peace with France.

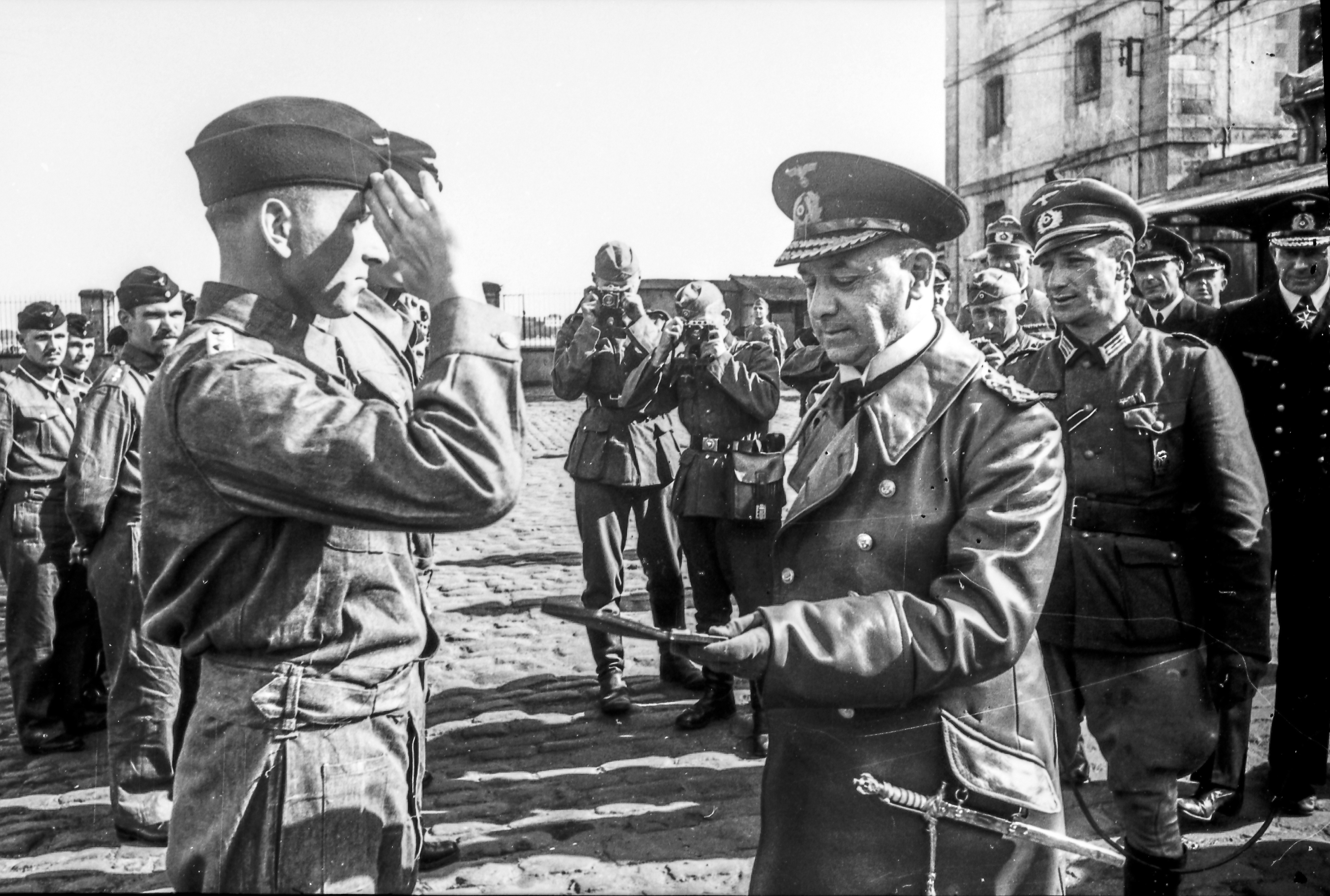
Raeder with Otto Kretschmer (left), August 1940

On 11 July 1940, Hitler and Raeder agreed to continue building the battleships called for by Plan Z. Raeder also had bases built at Trondheim on the Norwegian Sea and at Saint-Nazaire and Lorient on the Bay of Biscay. At this time, Raeder and other senior officers began submitting memos to invade (among others) Shetland, Iceland, the Azores, Iran, Madagascar, Kuwait, Egypt and the Dutch East Indies.

In January 1941, the battleships Scharnhorst and Gneisenau were sent on a successful commerce-raiding mission in the Atlantic. On 18 March, following the beginning of Lend-Lease, Raeder wanted to start firing on US warships even if unprovoked. He declined to invade the Azores because of the surface ship losses the previous year. Raeder urged Hitler to declare war on the United States throughout 1941 so the Kriegsmarine could begin sinking American warships escorting British convoys.

In April 1941, Raeder planned to follow up the success of Scharnhorst and Gneisenau's commerce-raiding mission with an even larger mission involving three battleships and a heavy cruiser under the command of Lütjens, codenamed Operation Rheinübung. The original plan was to have the battleships Scharnhorst and Gneisenau involved in the operation, but Scharnhorst was undergoing heavy repairs to her engines, and Gneisenau had just suffered a damaging torpedo hit days before which put her out of action for six months. In the end only the Bismarck and Prinz Eugen were sent out on the mission, which ended with Bismarck's sinking. The debacle almost saw the end of using capital ships against merchant shipping. Hitler was not pleased and saw the resources used in the construction and operation of the large Bismarck as a poor investment.

In late 1941, Raeder planned the "channel dash" which sent the remaining two battleships in the French ports to Germany, for further operations in Norwegian waters. The plan was to threaten the Lend-Lease convoys to the Soviet Union, to deter an invasion of Norway, and to tie down elements of the Home Fleet that might otherwise have been used in the Atlantic against the U-boat wolfpacks.

After the attack on Pearl Harbor Raeder, along with Field Marshal Keitel and Reichsmarschall Göring, urged Hitler to immediately declare war on the United States in view of the US war plan Rainbow Five, and to begin the U-boat attacks off the US east coast, which was later called the "Second Happy Time" by German submariners.

=== Resignation ===
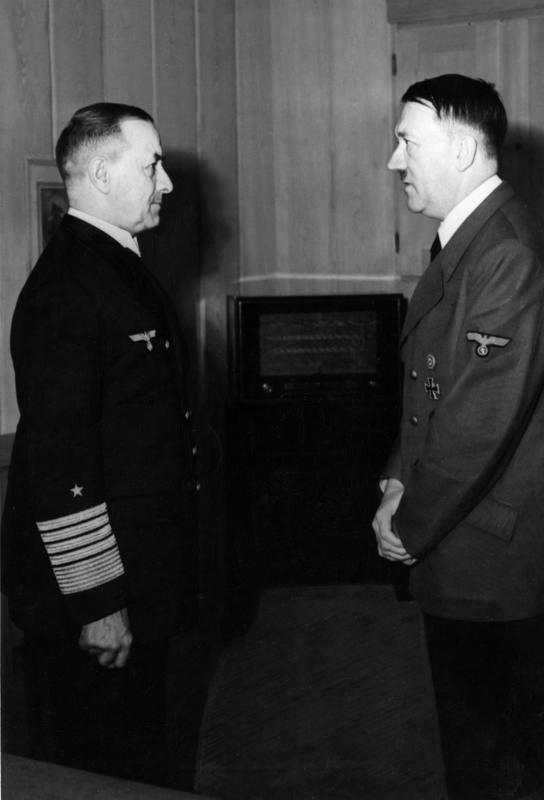
Raeder with Adolf Hitler, 1943

On 30 January 1943, following Hitler's outrage over the Battle of the Barents Sea, Karl Dönitz, the supreme commander of the Kriegsmarine's U-boat arm, was promoted to grand admiral, and Raeder was named admiral inspector, a ceremonial office. Raeder had failed to inform Hitler of the battle, which Hitler learned about from the foreign press. Hitler thought the Lützow and Admiral Hipper lacked fighting spirit, according to Albert Speer. The reorganisation fitted Speer's goal of working more closely with Dönitz.

== Post-war ==
=== Nuremberg trial ===
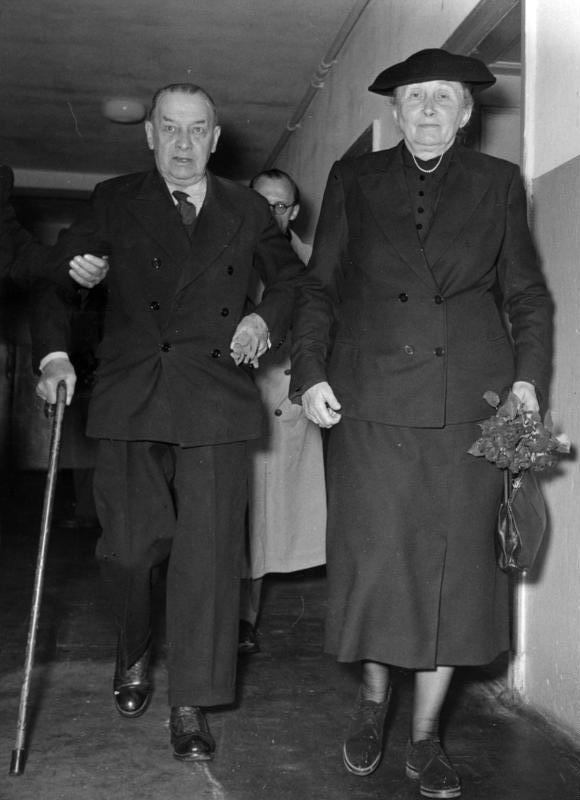
Raeder with his wife, Erika, after being released from prison (September 26, 1955)

Raeder was captured by Soviet troops on 23 June 1945 and imprisoned in Moscow. At the end of July, he was taken to Nuremberg to stand trial on the counts of: (1) conspiracy to commit crimes against peace, war crimes, and crimes against humanity; (2) planning, initiating, and waging wars of aggression; and (3) crimes against the laws of war. The most serious charges were that he ordered the carrying out of unrestricted submarine warfare, the sinking of unarmed and neutral ships, and that, defying the Second London Naval Treaty, he approved of the murder or non-rescue of survivors in the water.

Raeder was found guilty on all counts and sentenced to life imprisonment. He was surprised as he had expected to be sentenced to death. His wife, supported by German veterans, led several campaigns to free him until, on account of his ill health, he was released on 26 September 1955.

=== Death ===
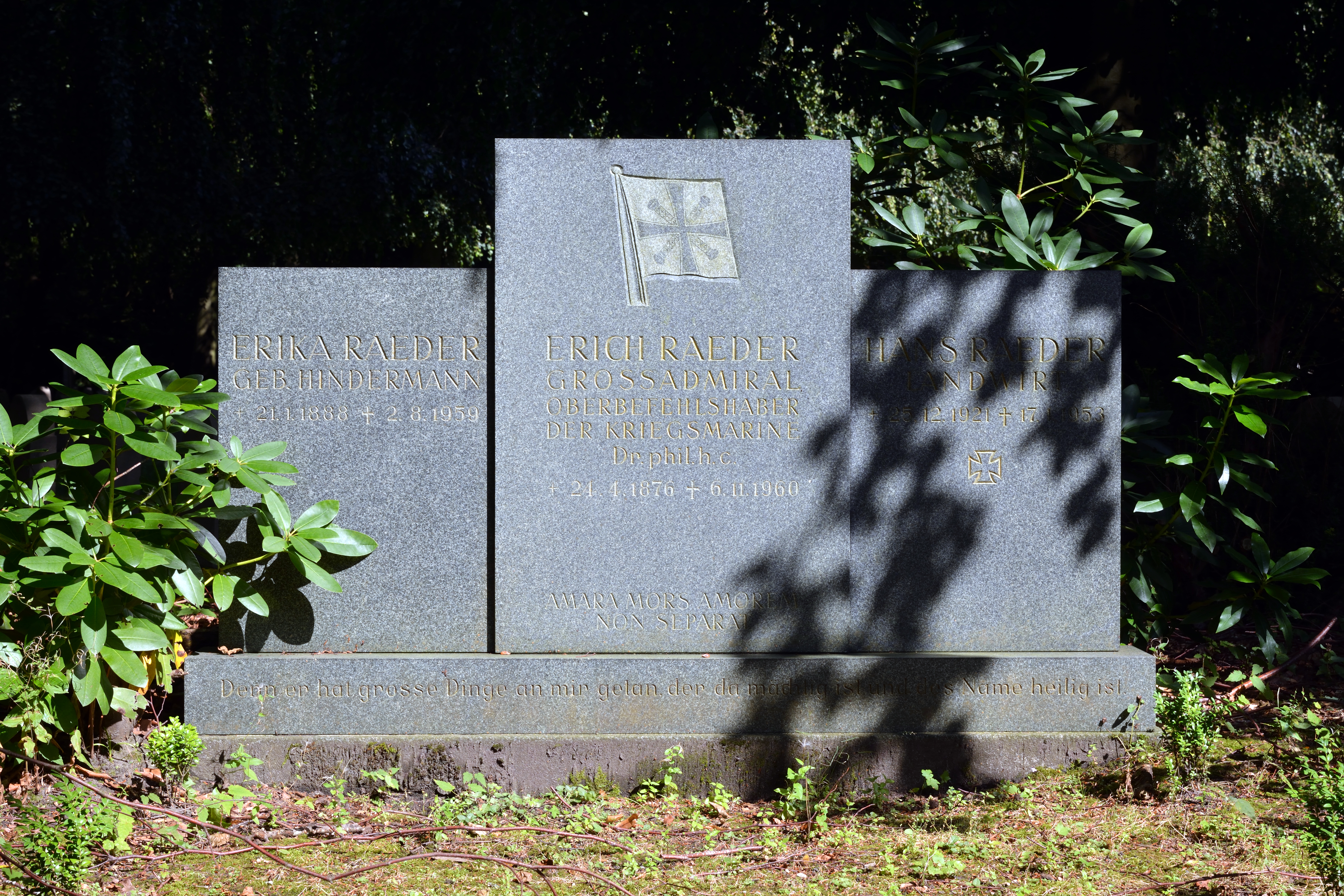
Raeder's grave in Kiel

Raeder wrote his autobiography, Mein Leben, using a ghostwriter.

He died of natural causes in Kiel on 6 November 1960. His wife had died the previous year. He is buried in the Nordfriedhof (North Cemetery) in Kiel. Former Grand Admiral Karl Dönitz attended his funeral on 12 November 1960.

== Service summary ==
=== Dates of Navy rank ===
- Seekadett (Sea cadet): 13 May 1895
- Unterleutnant zur See (Sub-Lieutenant): 25 October 1897
- Leutnant zur See (Lieutenant): 1 January 1899
- Oberleutnant zur See (Senior Lieutenant): 9 April 1900
- Kapitänleutnant (Captain-Lieutenant): 21 March 1905
- Korvettenkapitän (Lieutenant-Commander): 15 April 1911
- Fregattenkapitän (Commander): 26 April 1917
- Kapitän zur See (Captain): 29 November 1919
- Konteradmiral (Rear-Admiral): 1 August 1922
- Vizeadmiral (Vice-Admiral): 10 September 1925
- Admiral (Admiral): 1 October 1928
- Generaladmiral (General-Admiral): 20 April 1936
- Grossadmiral (Grand Admiral): 1 April 1939

=== Awards and decorations ===
- Order of the Double Dragon, 3rd class, 2nd Level (China, 10 October 1898)
- China Commemorative Medal (German Empire, 12 December 1901)
- Order of the Red Eagle, 4th class (Prussia, 22 June 1907)
- Honorary Knight 2nd class of the House and Merit Order of Peter Frederick Louis with Silver Crown (Oldenburg, 17 September 1907)
- Order of the Red Eagle, 4th class with Crown (Prussia, 5 September 1911)
- Commander's Cross of the Order of Franz Joseph (Austria, 16 September 1911)
- Commander's Cross of the Order of the Redeemer (Greece, 14 May 1912)
- Order of Saint Stanislaus, 2nd class (Russia, 16 April 1913)
- Iron Cross (1914) 2nd Class (19 November 1914) & 1st Class (18 February 1915)
- Imtiyaz Medal in silver with Swords
- Ottoman War Medal (also known as the "Gallipoli Star" or "Iron Crescent")
- Friedrich August Cross, 1st and 2nd class (Oldenburg)
- Knight's Cross of the Royal House Order of Hohenzollern with swords (5 June 1916)
- Military Merit Order, 4th class with swords and crown (Bavaria, 20 December 1916)
- War Commemorative Medal (Bulgaria, 20 November 1917)
- Military Merit Cross, 3rd class with war decoration (Austria-Hungary, 4 September 1918)
- Honorary doctorate from the Faculty of Philosophy, University of Kiel (31 May 1926)
- Grand Cross of the Order of Naval Merit (Spain, 16 November 1928)
- Commander's Cross with Star of the Order of Merit (Chile, September 1928)
- World War Commemorative Medal with swords on (Hungary, 3 June 1931)
- Grand Officer of the Order of Saints Maurice and Lazarus (Italy, 7 May 1934)
- Grand Cross of the Order of Military Merit (Bulgaria, 28 June 1934)
- Cross of Honour (9 October 1934)
- Order of Merit, 1st class (Hungary, 5 December 1934)
- Grand Cross of the Order of the White Rose of Finland (27 February 1936)
- Wehrmacht Long Service Award, 1st class (2 October 1936)
- Olympic Games Decoration, 1st class (16 August 1936)
- Golden Party Badge (30 January 1937)
- Grand Cross of the Order of Saints Maurice and Lazarus (Italy, 20 September 1937)
- Order of the Rising Sun, 1st class (Japan, 9 November 1937)
- War Memorial Medal (Bulgaria, 30 November 1937)
- Golden Medal of Honour of Hamburg (1 April 1939)
- Grand Cross of the Order of Naval Merit in White (Spain, 21 August 1939)
- Sudetenland Medal (25 October 1938) with "Prague Castle" clasp (Sudetenspange) (19 September 1939)
- Memel Medal (26 October 1939)
- Clasp to the Iron Cross, 1st and 2nd class (30 September 1939)
- Knight's Cross of the Iron Cross (nr.1) (30 September 1939) as Großadmiral and Oberbefehlshaber der Kriegsmarine
- Commander Grand Cross of the Order of the Sword (Sweden, 18 October 1940)
- Grand Cross of the Order of the Sword (Sweden, 24 October 1940)
- Grand Cross of the Military Order of Savoy (4 April 1942)
- Grand Cross Order of the Crown of King Zvonimir with swords and other decorations (Croatia, 26 September 1942)
- Grand Cross of the Order of Merit of the Kingdom of Hungary with war ribbon with swords (Hungary, 8 February 1943)
- Grand Cross of Order of St Alexander with swords (Bulgaria, 3 September 1941)
- Order of Michael the Brave, 1st, 2nd and 3rd Class (Romania, 14 October 1941)
- Grand Cross of the Order of the Cross of Liberty (Finland, 25 March 1942)

Military offices
Preceded by Admiral Hans Zenker	Commander in Chief of the Reichsmarine; 1928–1935	Succeeded by himself as Commander in Chief of the Kriegsmarine
Preceded by himself as Commander in Chief of the Reichsmarine	Commander in Chief of the Kriegsmarine; 1935–1943	Succeeded by Karl Dönitz
Awards and achievements
Preceded by Sir Stafford Cripps	Cover of Time magazine 20 April 1942	Succeeded by Pierre Laval
