= Earl F. Ziemke =

American historian

Earl Ziemke
- Born: Earl Frederick Ziemke; December 16, 1922; Milwaukee, Wisconsin, U.S.
- Died: October 15, 2007 (aged 84); Arlington, Virginia, U.S.
- Occupations: Historian; professor; author
- Awards: Outstanding Civilian Service Award

Academic work
- Era: 20th century
- Institutions: University of Georgia

Earl Frederick Ziemke (December 16, 1922 – October 15, 2007) was an American military historian whose work was mainly on World War II and especially the Soviet-German clash in Eastern Europe.

== Biography ==
Earl Ziemke was born on December 16, 1922, in Milwaukee, Wisconsin, and served in the Marines during World War II. After learning Japanese at Camp Elliot, California, Ziemke served in the Pacific. He fought in the Battle of Peleliu and then won the Purple Heart for wounds received in the assault on Okinawa.

At the end of the war, Corporal Ziemke served at Tientsin, China. After his discharge, he used the G.I. Bill to pursue higher education, and in 1951 he received his Ph.D. from the University of Wisconsin.

From 1951 until 1955, he worked at the Bureau of Applied Social Research at Columbia University, and, in 1955, he joined the staff of the Center of Military History, US Army, where he became Deputy Chief of the General History Branch.

In 1967, he went to the University of Georgia as a full professor and in 1977, he rose to the rank of research professor. He retired in 1993 as research professor emeritus.

He occasionally served as an expert witness for the US Justice Department on war crimes trials relating to the Holocaust. He was member in various historical societies, such as The World War II Studies Association.

In 1973, Secretary of the Army Howard “Bo” Callaway presented Ziemke with the Outstanding Civilian Service Award.

Ziemke died on October 15, 2007, and is interred at the Arlington National Cemetery. He was survived by his wife Ida Mae Saltenberger Ziemke, his daughter Caroline F. Ziemke, who worked for the Institute for Defense Analyses, both of Annandale, Virginia, and a sister, June Villa of Milwaukee.

A memorial service was also held at the Great Episcopal Church of Saint Gregory in Athens, Georgia on December 15.

== Select bibliography ==
- Battle for Berlin: End of the Third Reich, Ballantine Books; 2nd edition 1972, ASIN B000KK7YVS
- The U.S. Army in the Occupation of Germany, 1944-1946, U.S. Army Center of Military History, 1975, ASIN B0006CN1NK
- The Soviet Juggernaut, Time-Life Books, 1980, ISBN 978-0809433896
- Stalingrad to Berlin: The German Defeat in the East, Dorset Press, 1986, ISBN 978-0880290593, (Online version - transcribed and formatted by Jerry Holden for the HyperWar Foundation)
- Moscow to Stalingrad: Decision in the East, Hippocrene Books, March 1989, ISBN 978-0880292948 (Online version - transcribed and formatted by Jerry Holden for the HyperWar Foundation)
- German Report Series: German Northern Theatre Of Operations 1940-45, 2003, Naval and Military Press, 2009 (reprint of 2003 edition), ISBN 978-1843425038
- The Red Army, 1918-1941: From Vanguard of World Revolution to US Ally, Frank Cass, 2004, ISBN 978-0714655512

== See also ==
- Soviet deep battle military theory
