= Hermann Boehm (admiral) =

German admiral (1884–1972)

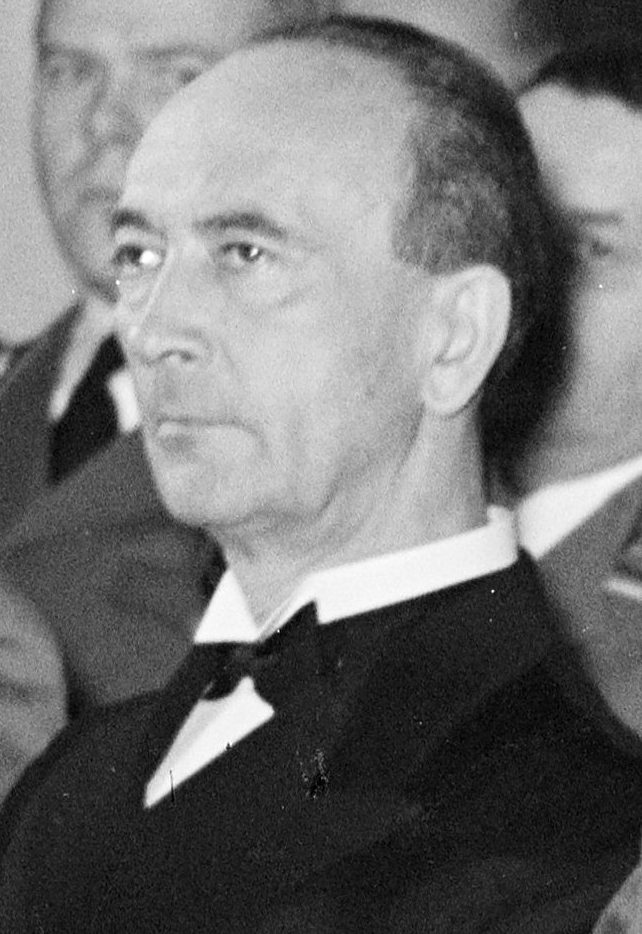
- Boehm as commander of German naval forces in Norway, 1942
- Born: 18 January 1884; Rybnik
- Died: 11 April 1972 (aged 88); Kiel
- Military career
- Allegiance: German Empire (to 1919); Weimar Republic (to 1933); Nazi Germany
- Branch: Imperial German Navy; Reichsmarine; Kriegsmarine
- Service years: 1903–45
- Rank: Generaladmiral
- Commands: SMS Hessen; Naval Region North Sea; Fleet Commander of the Kriegsmarine; Commanding Admiral, Norway
- Conflicts: World War I Spanish Civil War; World War II

Hermann Boehm (18 January 1884, Rybnik – 11 April 1972, Kiel) was a German naval officer who rose to the rank of General Admiral during the Second World War.

== Military service ==
Boehm joined the Kaiserliche Marine on 1 April 1903 as a cadet and did his basic training on SMS Stein. He was promoted to Kapitänleutnant on 19 September 1914 and during the First World War commanded various torpedo boats (such as SMS G41 during the Battle of Jutland and later SMS V 69). In 1919 he was dismissed from the service but when the navy was reactivated as the Reichsmarine in 1920 he was recalled to it, mainly serving in staff posts until 1933.

On 3 October 1933 Boehm was made the commander of the Hessen for a year, until he was promoted to Konteradmiral in autumn 1934 and appointed commander in chief of the navy's reconnaissance forces. From 25 August 1936 to 3 August 1937, during the opening stages of the Spanish Civil War, he commanded the German naval forces off the Spanish coast. On 1 April 1937 he was promoted to vice admiral and put in command of the North Sea Station. Early in 1938 he became a full admiral and in November the same year Flottenchef (fleet commander).

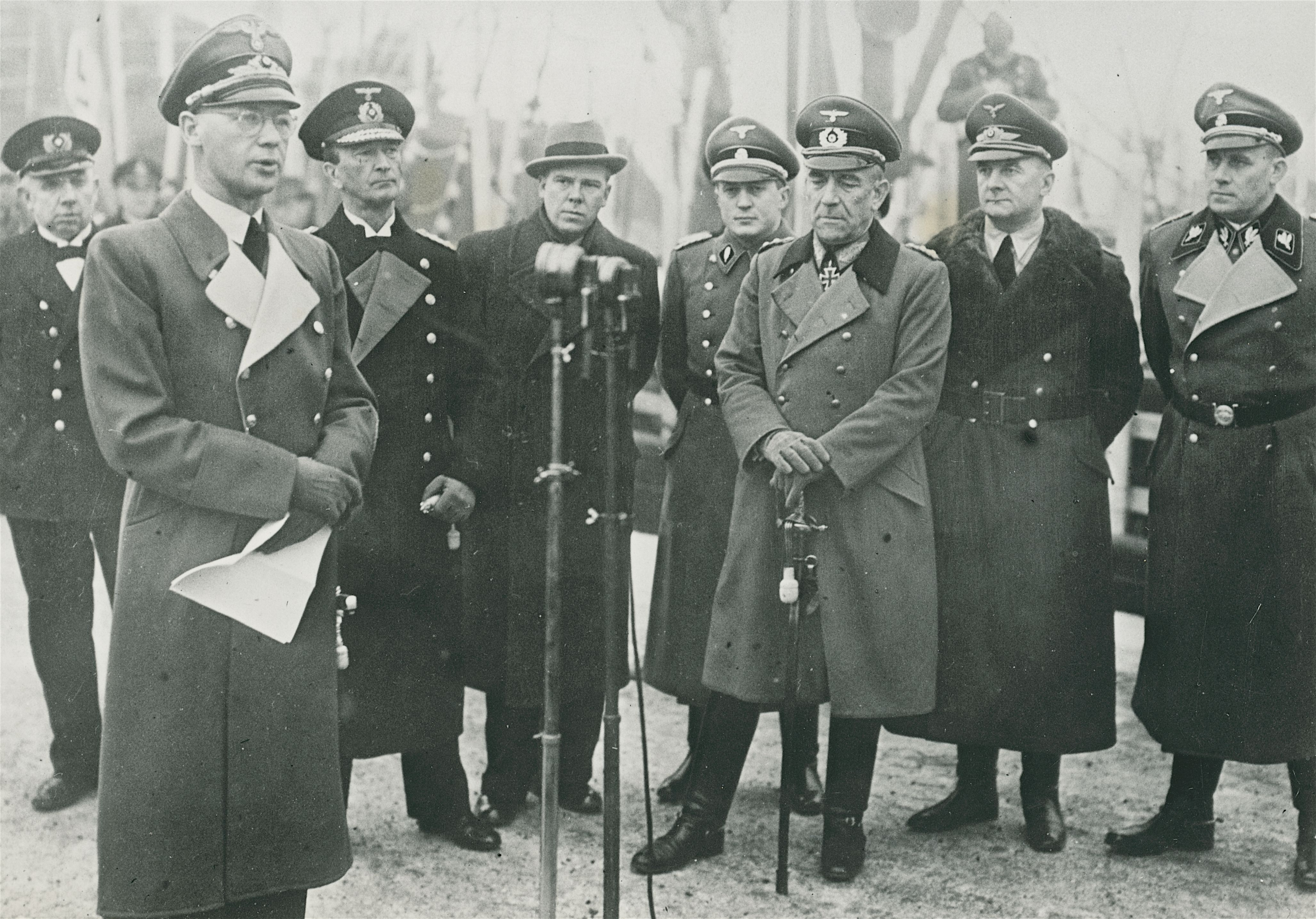
Admiral Boehm (3rd left) in Oslo with Reichskommissar for Norway Terboven as a "Christmas ship" with gifts for German soldiers arrive, 1940

Shortly after the Battle of the River Plate, Boehm was relieved of command and left without a post for several months. After Operation Weserübung, the invasion of Norway in April 1940, he was made the commander of German naval forces there on 10 April 1940, being promoted to General Admiral on 1 April the following year. In March 1943 he was recalled from Norway and on 31 May that year officially discharged from active service, effective on the following 1 June. From 1 March 1944 to 31 March 1945 he commanded the inspectorate of the Kriegsmarine's education programme, at the end of which post he was fully discharged from the Kriegsmarine.

== Decorations ==
- Iron Cross (1914) 2nd and 1st class
- Knight's Cross of the House Order of Hohenzollern with swords
- Friedrich-August-Kreuz 2nd and 1st class
- Verwundetenabzeichen (1918) in black
- Medalla de la Campaña
- Spanish Cross
- Wehrmacht-Dienstauszeichnung 4th, 3rd, 2nd and 1st class
- Anschluss Medal
- Clasp to the Iron Cross 2nd and 1st class
- German Cross in Gold on 20 November 1941

== Bibliography ==
- (in German) Hans H. Hildebrand und Ernest Henriot: Deutschlands Admirale 1849–1945 Band 1: A-G, Biblio Verlag, Osnabrück 1988, ISBN 3-7648-1499-3, pp. 126–127
