= Convoy QP 1 =

- Part of Arctic Convoys of the Second World War
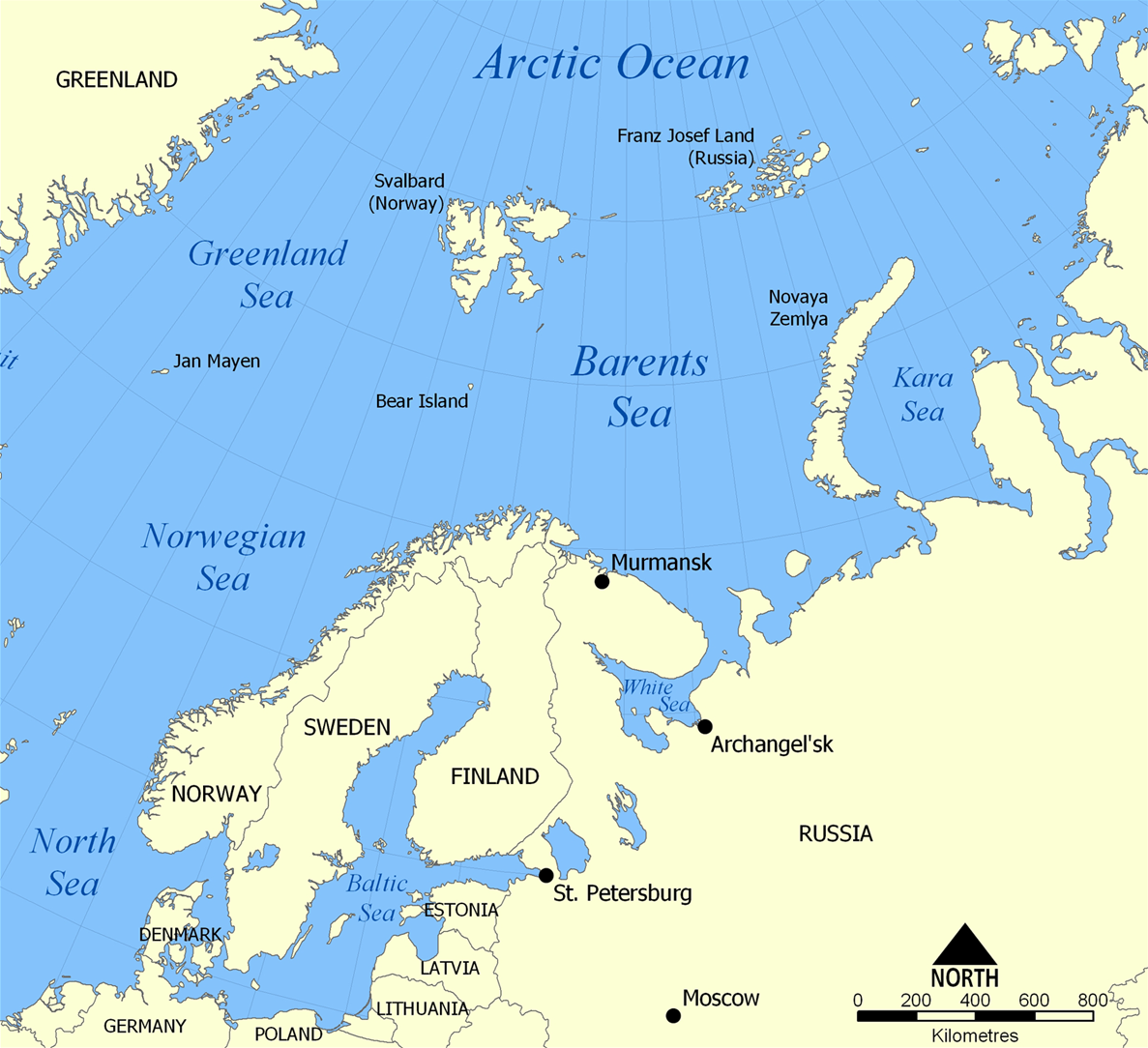
- The Norwegian and the Barents seas, site of the Arctic convoys
| Date | 28 September – 19 October 1941 |
| Location | Arctic Ocean |
| Result | British victory |

Belligerents
| Royal Navy; Merchant Navy | Luftwaffe; Kriegsmarine |

Commanders and leaders
| Escorts: Jack Borrett; Convoy: John Dowding | Hans-Jürgen Stumpff; Hermann Böhm |

Convoy QP 1 (28 September – 19 October 1941) was the first Arctic Convoy of the Second World War by which the Allies brought back the ships of Operation Dervish that had carried supplies to the Soviet Union after Operation Barbarossa, the German invasion of 22 June 1941. The convoy sailed from Murmansk on 28 September 1941 and arrived safely at Scapa Flow in Orkney on 19 October.

From Operation Dervish, at the end of August 1941 to 20 December, six more convoys (Convoy PQ 1 to Convoy PQ 6) sent 45 ships, all of which reached Arkhangelsk or Murmansk. German awareness of these and the reciprocal westbound convoys (Convoy QP 1 to Convoy QP 4) was too vague to plan attacks by the Kriegsmarine or the Luftwaffe.

On 13 November 1941, the commander-in-chief of the Kriegsmarine, Großadmiral (Grand Admiral) Erich Raeder, told Hitler that, owing to the extreme weather and the lack of air reconnaissance, the prospects of the small number of U-boats in the Arctic Ocean were poor.

== Background ==
=== Lend-lease ===
The Soviet leaders needed to replace the colossal losses of military equipment lost after the German invasion, especially when Soviet war industries were being moved out of the war zone and emphasised tank and aircraft deliveries. Machine tools, steel and aluminium was needed to replace indigenous resources lost in the invasion. The pressure on the civilian sector of the economy needed to be limited by food deliveries. The Soviets wanted to concentrate the resources that remained on items that the Soviet war economy that had the greatest comparative advantage over the German economy. Aluminium imports allowed aircraft production to a far greater extent than would have been possible using local sources and tank production was emphasised at the expense of lorries and food supplies were squeezed by reliance on what could be obtained from lend–lease. At the Moscow Conference, it was acknowledged that 1.5 million tons of shipping was needed to transport the supplies of the First Protocol and that Soviet sources could provide less than 10 per cent of the carrying capacity.

The British and Americans accepted that the onus was on them to find most of the shipping, despite their commitments in other theatres. The Prime Minister, Winston Churchill, made a commitment to send a convoy to the Arctic ports of the USSR every ten days and to deliver 1,200 tanks a month from July 1942 to January 1943, followed by 2,000 tanks and another 3,600 aircraft more than already promised. In November, the US president, Franklin D. Roosevelt, ordered Admiral Emory Land of the US Maritime Commission and then the head of the War Shipping Administration that deliveries to Russia should only be limited by 'insurmountable difficulties'. The first convoy was due at Murmansk around 12 October and the next convoy was to depart Iceland on 22 October. A motley of British, Allied and neutral shipping loaded with military stores and raw materials for the Soviet war effort would be assembled at Hvalfjörður in Iceland, convenient for ships from both sides of the Atlantic.

From Operation Dervish to Convoy PQ 11, the supplies to the USSR were mostly British, in British ships defended by the Royal Navy. A fighter force that could defend Murmansk was delivered that protected the Arctic ports and railways into the hinterland. Before September 1941 the British had dispatched 450 aircraft, 22,000 long tons (22,000 t) of rubber, 3,000,000 pairs of boots and stocks of tin, aluminium, jute, lead and wool. In September British and US representatives travelled to Moscow to study Soviet requirements and their ability to meet them. The representatives of the three countries drew up a protocol in October 1941 to last until June 1942. British supplied aircraft and tanks reinforced the Russian defences of Leningrad and Moscow from December 1941. The tanks and aircraft did not save Moscow but were important in the Soviet counter-offensive. The Luftwaffe was by then reduced to 600 operational aircraft on the Eastern Front, to an extent a consequence of Luftflotte 2 being sent to the Mediterranean against the British. Tanks and aircraft supplied by the British helped the Soviet counter-offensive force back the Germans further than might have been possible. In January and February 1941, deliveries of tanks and aircraft allowed the Russians to have a margin of safety should the Germans attempt to counter-attack.

=== Signals intelligence ===
==== Ultra ====
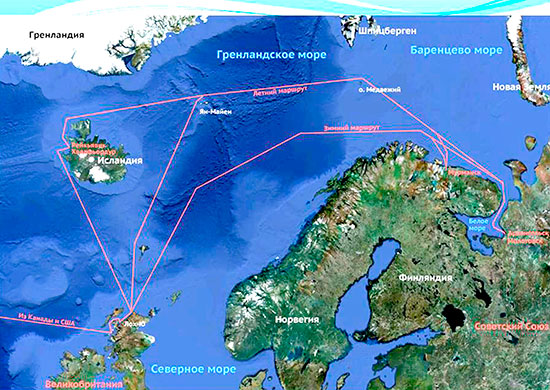
Russian map showing Arctic convoy routes from Britain and Iceland, past Norway to the Barents Sea and northern Russian ports

The British Government Code and Cypher School (GC&CS) based at Bletchley Park housed a small industry of code-breakers and traffic analysts. By June 1941, the German Enigma machine Home Waters (Heimish) settings used by surface ships and U-boats could quickly be read. On 1 February 1942, the Enigma machines used in U-boats in the Atlantic and Mediterranean were changed but German ships and the U-boats in Arctic waters continued with the older Heimish Home Hydra from 1942, Dolphin to the British). By mid-1941, British Y-stations were able to receive and read Luftwaffe W/T transmissions and give advance warning of Luftwaffe operations. In 1941, naval Headache personnel with receivers to eavesdrop on Luftwaffe wireless transmissions were embarked on warships.

=== B-Dienst ===
The rival German Beobachtungsdienst (B-Dienst, Observation Service) of the Kriegsmarine Marinenachrichtendienst (MND, Naval Intelligence Service) had broken several Admiralty codes and cyphers by 1939, which were used to help Kriegsmarine ships elude British forces and provide opportunities for surprise attacks. From June to August 1940, six British submarines were sunk in the Skaggerak using information gleaned from British wireless signals. In 1941, B-Dienst read signals from the Commander in Chief Western Approaches informing convoys of areas patrolled by U-boats, enabling the submarines to move into "safe" zones.

=== Arctic Ocean ===
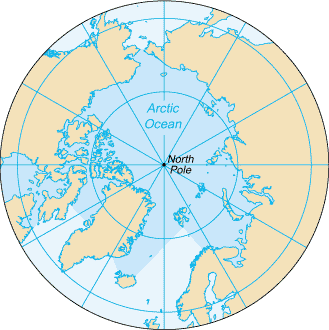
Diagram of the Arctic Ocean

Between Greenland and Norway are some of the most stormy waters of the world's oceans, 890 mi (1,440 km) of water under gales full of snow, sleet and hail. The cold Arctic water was met by the Gulf Stream, warm water from the Gulf of Mexico, which became the North Atlantic Drift. Arriving at the south-west of England the drift moves between Scotland and Iceland; north of Norway the drift splits. One stream bears north of Bear Island to Svalbard and a southern stream follows the coast of Murmansk into the Barents Sea. The mingling of cold Arctic water and warmer water of higher salinity generates thick banks of fog for convoys to hide in but the waters drastically reduced the effectiveness of ASDIC as U-boats moved in waters of differing temperatures and density.

In winter, polar ice can form as far south as 50 mi (80 km) off the North Cape and in summer it can recede to Svalbard. The area is in perpetual darkness in winter and permanent daylight in the summer and can make air reconnaissance almost impossible. Around the North Cape and in the Barents Sea the sea temperature rarely rises about 4 °C (39 °F) and a man in the water will die unless rescued immediately. The cold water and air makes spray freeze on the superstructure of ships, which has to be removed quickly to avoid the ship becoming top-heavy. Conditions in U-boats were, if anything, worse the boats having to submerge in warmer water to rid the superstructure of ice. Crewmen on watch were exposed to the elements, oil lost its viscosity and nuts froze and sheared off bolts. Heaters in the hull were too demanding of current and could not be run continuously.

== Prelude ==
=== Kriegsmarine ===
German naval forces in Norway were commanded by Hermann Böhm, the Kommandierender Admiral Norwegen. Two U-boats were based in Norway in July 1941, four in September, five in December and four in January 1942. By mid-February twenty U-boats were anticipated in the region, with six based in Norway, two in Narvik or Tromsø, two at Trondheim and two at Bergen. Hitler contemplated establishing a unified command but decided against it. The German battleship Tirpitz arrived at Trondheim on 16 January, the first ship of a general move of surface ships to Norway. British convoys to Russia had received little attention since they averaged only eight ships each and the long Arctic winter nights negated even the limited Luftwaffe effort that was available.

=== Luftflotte 5 ===
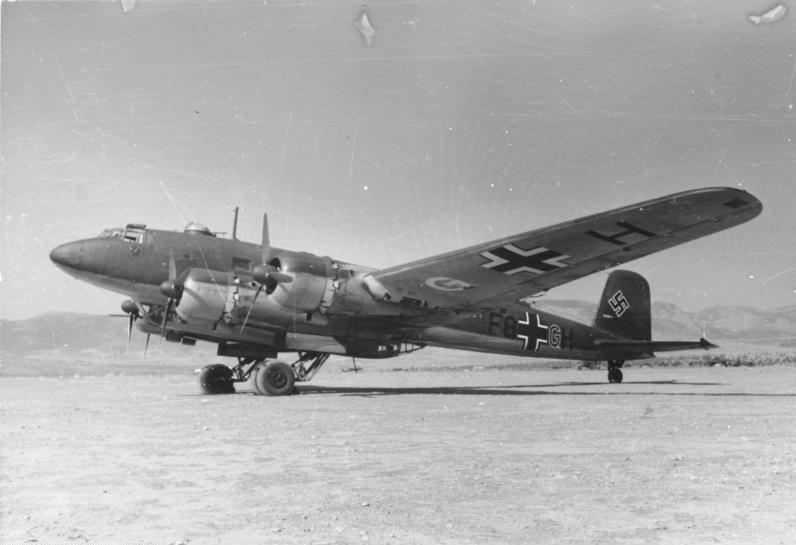
A Focke-Wulf Fw 200 Kondor of KG 40

In mid-1941, Luftflotte 5 (Air Fleet 5) had been re-organised for Operation Barbarossa with Luftgau Norwegen (Air Region Norway) headquartered in Oslo. Fliegerführer Stavanger (Air Commander Stavanger) the centre and north of Norway, Jagdfliegerführer Norwegen (Fighter Leader Norway) commanded the fighter force and Fliegerführer Kerkenes (Oberst [colonel] Andreas Nielsen) in the far north had airfields at Kirkenes and Banak. The Air Fleet had 180 aircraft, sixty of which were reserved for operations on the Karelian Front against the Red Army.

The distance from Banak to Arkhangelsk was 560 mi (900 km) and Fliegerführer Kerkenes had only ten Junkers Ju 88 bombers of Kampfgeschwader 30, thirty Junkers Ju 87 Stuka dive-bombers ten Messerschmitt Bf 109 fighters of Jagdgeschwader 77, five Messerschmitt Bf 110 heavy fighters of Zerstörergeschwader 76, ten reconnaissance aircraft and an anti-aircraft battalion. Sixty aircraft were far from adequate in such a climate and terrain where

...there is no favourable season for operations. (Earl Ziemke [1959] in Claasen [2001])

The emphasis of air operations changed from army support to anti-shipping operations only after March 1942, when Allied Arctic convoys becoming larger and more frequent coincided with the reinforcement of Norway with ships and aircraft and the less extreme climatic conditions of the Arctic summer.

=== Arctic convoys ===
A convoy was defined as at least one merchant ship sailing under the protection of at least one warship. At first the British had intended to run convoys to Russia on a forty-day cycle (the number of days between convoy departures) during the winter of 1941–1942 but this was shortened to a ten-day cycle. The round trip to Murmansk for warships was three weeks and each convoy needed a cruiser and two destroyers, which severely depleted the Home Fleet. Convoys left port and rendezvoused with the escorts at sea. A cruiser provided distant cover from a position to the west of Bear Island. Air support was limited to 330 Squadron and 269 Squadron of RAF Coastal Command from Iceland, with some help from anti-submarine patrols along the coast of Norway from RAF Sullom Voe in Shetland. Anti-submarine trawlers escorted the convoys on the first part of the outward voyage. Built for Arctic conditions, the trawlers were coal-burning ships and had sufficient endurance. The trawlers were commanded by their peacetime crews and captains with the rank of Skipper, Royal Naval Reserve (RNR). who were used to Arctic conditions, supplemented by anti-submarine specialists of the Royal Naval Volunteer Reserve (RNVR). British minesweepers based at Arkhangelsk met the convoys to join the escort for the remainder of the voyage.

== Convoy QP 1 ==
The heavy cruiser, HMS London, escorted by the destroyer Active, had carried RAF personnel and a British–American diplomatic mission with Lord Beaverbrook and Averell Harriman, for talks in Moscow, to Arkhangelsk from 22 to 27 September 1941. The cruiser joined Convoy QP 1 for the first part of the return journey, which on departing from Arkhangelsk, was escorted in the White Sea by Russian SKRs (patrol ships, storoshevy korabi) of the White Sea Flotilla. The convoy comprised 14 merchant ships, the one Dutch and six British freighters from Operation Dervish, the first Arctic convoy, sailed in ballast with seven Soviet ships carrying trade goods (mainly timber) for the western Allies. The Convoy Commodore was Captain John Dowding (RNR) in Llanstephan Castle. The ocean escort comprised the destroyer Electra and the Shakespearian class anti-submarine warfare trawlers Hamlet, Macbeth and Ophelia that had escorted the Dervish ships. Local escort was provided by the Royal Navy Halcyon-class minesweepers Halcyon, Harrier and Salamander that had escorted the Dervish convoy and were to stay in North Russia to sweep convoys in and out of port. With a speed and armament comparable to Flower-class corvettes the minesweepers were effective anti-submarine vessels. Distant cover was provided by units of the Home Fleet, that were engaged in Operation EJ, air attacks on ships off the Norwegian coast.

== Voyage ==
Convoy QP 1 departed Arkhangelsk on 28 September 1941, accompanied by the local escort, which returned to Arkhangelsk after two days. On 2 October, the cruiser, London, detached from the convoy for a fast independent transit to Scapa Flow and was replaced by the cruiser Shropshire. On 4 October the oiler Black Ranger joined the convoy, escorted by the destroyer Anthony. On 5 October, the trawler Ophelia had engine trouble and had to be towed by to port in Iceland by Active. Two Soviet freighters, one of which, Sukhona, was over 20 years old and referred to by Electra's crew as 'Dirty Joe', were unable to keep up and dropped out of the convoy; both arrived safely after an independent voyage. There was no interference by German forces and Convoy QP 1 arrived in Scapa Flow in Orkney without harm on 10 October.

=== Operation EJ ===
Map of Lofoten, Vestfjorden and Vesteraalen

The aircraft carrier HMS Victorious, protected by the battleship HMS King George V, the light cruiser HMS Penelope and their destroyer escorts, sailed early in October 1941. Shipping was to be attacked along the coast between Glomfjord and Vestfjord near Bodø. Victorious rendezvoused with King George V off Seidisfjord on the evening of 6 October and the force was west of Lofoten at dawn on 9 October. Five Albacores of the thirteen from 817 Naval Air Squadron (NAS) and 832 NAS were damaged in stormy weather and only the eight undamaged Albacores took off, three with torpedoes and five carrying six 250 lb (110 kg) General-purpose bombs each. The crews were to attack shipping but the poor weather forced five to return early. Victorious was pitching in the stormy seas and an Albacore landing with its torpedo was severely damaged, the crew escaped unhurt.

Three Albacores found a merchant ship in Glomfjord, hit it with two bombs and set it on fire. The Albacores bombed cable pylons on Grond Island, damaging them and bombed a ship in Bodø to no effect. There was some light anti-aircraft fire but the aircraft returned safely. Later in the morning, eight Albacores took off carrying bombs and found two large merchant ships escorted by two flak ships. Aircraft from 817 NAS attacked 10 nmi (19 km; 12 mi) north of Bodø, combining low-altitude and low dive-bombing for no loss. One ship was sunk and two Albacores crashed on landing, one having been damaged by anti-aircraft fire wounding the Telegraphist Air Gunner. No Luftwaffe aircraft were seen, bearing out intelligence reports that Luftflotte 5 in Norway had been depleted by the campaign against the USSR. The ships reached Scapa Flow late on 10 October.

== Aftermath ==
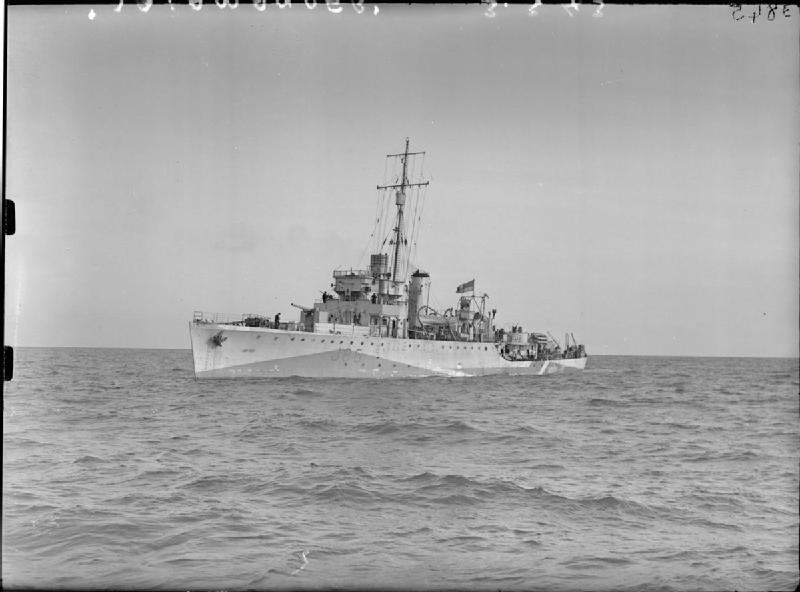
Halcyon-class minesweeper

Convoy QP 1 arrived without loss on 19 October 1941. The Germans paid little attention to the British convoys before March 1942, which averaged only eight outbound ships each. (Note: Some cargo had been stored badly, that loaded at Glasgow in particular.) In the winter darkness the Luftwaffe had great difficulty in finding Allied convoys, which made attacks on Murmansk and the railway south more practical. As the Allied supply effort increased in 1942, the Arctic route carrying 1.2 million tons of supplies of the total of 2.3 million tons, the reinforcement of the Luftwaffe and Kriegsmarine led to German countermeasures growing in extent and effect.

To protect return convoys and sweep for mines, the commander of the Home Fleet, John Tovey, established a force of ocean-going, Halcyon-class minesweepers at the Kola naval base, which had the speed, armament and anti-submarine capacity similar to that of Flower-class corvettes. As specialist vessels, the minesweepers usually had experienced career officers. The fleet oiler RFA Aldersdale had arrived with Operation Dervish (21–31 August 1941), to stay at Kola to fuel ships for the return journey. Soviet destroyers at Polyarnoe were available to reinforce convoy escorts for the last part of the journey.

=== Subsequent operations ===
From Operation Dervish, at the end of August 1941, the first convoy which comprised seven ships, to 20 December, six more convoys (Convoy PQ 1 to Convoy PQ 6) sent 45 ships, all of which reached Arkhangelsk or Murmansk. German awareness of these and the reciprocal westbound convoys (Convoy QP 1 to Convoy QP 4) was too vague to plan attacks on the convoys by the Kriegsmarine or the Luftwaffe. On 13 November 1941, the commander-in-chief of the Kriegsmarine, Großadmiral (Grand Admiral) Erich Raeder, told Hitler that, owing to the extreme weather and the lack of air reconnaissance, the prospects of the small number of U-boats in the Arctic Ocean were poor.

== Allied order of battle ==
=== Convoyed ships ===
Merchant ships, Arkhangelsk to Orkney
| Ship | Year | Flag | GRT | P'n | Notes |
Freighters
| Alchiba | 1920 | Netherlands | 4,427 | 21 | Arr. Orkney 10 October |
| Alma-Ata | 1920 | Soviet Union | 3,611 | 32 | Arr. Orkney 10 October |
| Budyonny | 1923 | Soviet Union | 2,482 | 43 | Arr. Orkney 10 October |
| Esneh | 1919 | United Kingdom | 1,931 | 12 | Arr. Orkney 10 October |
| Lancastrian Prince | 1940 | United Kingdom | 1,914 | 11 | Arr. Orkney 10 October |
| Llanstephan Castle | 1914 | United Kingdom | 11,348 | 31 | Convoy Commodore, arr. Orkney 10 October |
| Mossovet | 1935 | Soviet Union | 2,981 | 24 | Straggler, arr. Orkney 10 October |
| New Westminster City | 1929 | United Kingdom | 4,747 | 42 | Arr. Orkney 10 October |
| Rodina | 1922 | Soviet Union | 4,441 | 13 | Arr. Orkney 10 October |
| Sevzaples | 1932 | Soviet Union | 3,974 | 33 | Arr. Orkney 10 October |
| Stary Bolshevik | 1933 | Soviet Union | 3,974 | 23 | Arr. Orkney 10 October |
| Sukhona | 1918 | Soviet Union | 3,124 | 25 | Straggler, arr. Orkney 10 October |
| Trehata | 1928 | United Kingdom | 4,817 | 41 | Vice-Convoy Commodore, arr. Orkney 10 October |
Fleet oiler and escort
| RFA Black Ranger | 1941 | Royal Fleet Auxiliary | 8,402 | 22 | Ranger-class tanker Joined 4 October |
| HMS Anthony | 1930 | Royal Navy | — | — | A-class destroyer Joined 4 October |

=== Convoy formation ===
Order of sail (Note: Convoys had a standard formation of short columns, number 1 to the left in the direction of travel. Each position in the column was numbered; 11 was the first ship in column 1 and 12 was the second ship in the column; 21 was the first ship in column 2.)
| column 1 | column 2 | column 3 | column 4 |
|---|---|---|---|
| 11 Lancastrian Prince | 21 Alchiba | 31 Llanstephan Castle | 41 Trehata |
| 12 Esneh | 22 RFA Black Ranger | 32 Alma-Ata | 42 New Westminster City |
| 13 Rodina | 23 Stary Bolshevik | 33 Sevzaples | 43 Budyonny |
| 14 — | 24 Mossovet | 34 — | 44 — |
| 15 — | 25 Sukhona | 35 — | 45 — |

=== Arkhangelsk–White Sea escort ===
- White Sea Flotilla

Convoy escorts
| Name | Flag | Type | Notes |
Murmansk local escort
| HMS Halcyon | Royal Navy | Halcyon-class minesweeper | 28–30 September |
| HMS Harrier | Royal Navy | Halcyon-class minesweeper | 28–30 September |
| HMS Salamander | Royal Navy | Halcyon-class minesweeper | 28–30 September |
Oceanic escort
| HMS London | Royal Navy | County-class cruiser | Cruiser cover, 28 September – 2 October, replaced by Shropshire |
| HMS Shropshire | Royal Navy | County-class cruiser | Cruiser cover, 2–10 October |
| HMS Active | Royal Navy | A-class destroyer | 28 September – 5 October |
| HMS Anthony | Royal Navy | A-class destroyer | Joined 4 October from Convoy PQ 1, 4–9 October |
| HMS Electra | Royal Navy | E-class destroyer | 28 September – 5 October |
| HMT Hamlet | Royal Navy | Shakespearian-class trawler | 28 September – 9 October |
| HMT Macbeth | Royal Navy | Shakespearian-class trawler | 28 September – 9 October |
| HMT Ophelia | Royal Navy | Shakespearian-class trawler | Defects, Active towed to Akureyri 10 October |
