= Convoy PQ 1 =

- Part of Arctic Convoys of the Second World War
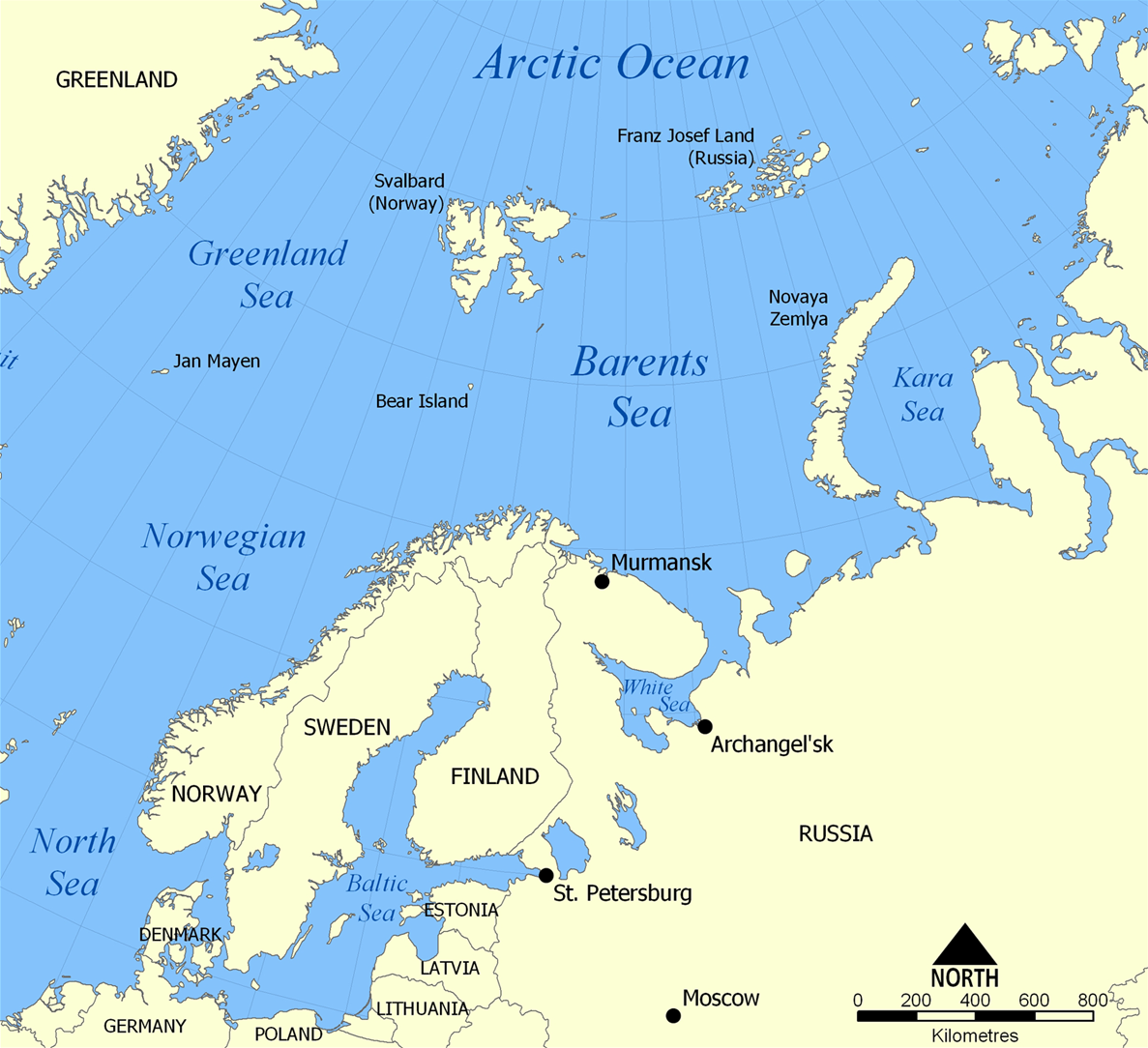
- The Norwegian and the Barents seas, site of the Arctic convoys
Date	28 September – 11 October 1941
Location	Arctic Ocean
Result	British victory

Belligerents
Royal Navy; Merchant Navy	Luftwaffe; Kriegsmarine

Commanders and leaders
Escorts: Edward Thornton; Convoy: D. Ridley	Hans-Jürgen Stumpff; Hermann Böhm

Strength
10 merchant ships; 1 fleet oiler; 12 escorts in relays	Luftflotte 5; Kriegsmarine

Casualties and losses
Nil	Nil

Convoy PQ 1 (28 September – 11 October 1941) was the first of the Arctic Convoys of the Second World War to have the code prefix PQ, which was chosen from the initials of Commander Phillip Quellyn Roberts, an operations officer in the Admiralty; the reciprocal return convoys were coded QP. The Western Allies used the Arctic route to supply the Soviet Union after the beginning of Operation Barbarossa, the German invasion, that began on 22 June 1941.

The convoy sailed from Hvalfjörður in Iceland and arrived at Arkhangelsk after an uneventful voyage. To protect return convoys and sweep for mines, a British naval force of ocean-going Halcyon-class minesweepers to be established at the Kola naval base, accompanied the convoy, they had the speed, armament and anti-submarine capacity similar to that of Flower-class corvettes.

The fleet oiler RFA Aldersdale, that had accompanied the first Arctic convoy, Operation Dervish (21–31 August 1941), was at Kola to refuel ships for the return journey. Soviet destroyers at Polyarnoe could reinforce convoy escorts for the last part of the journey.

== Background ==
=== Lend-lease ===
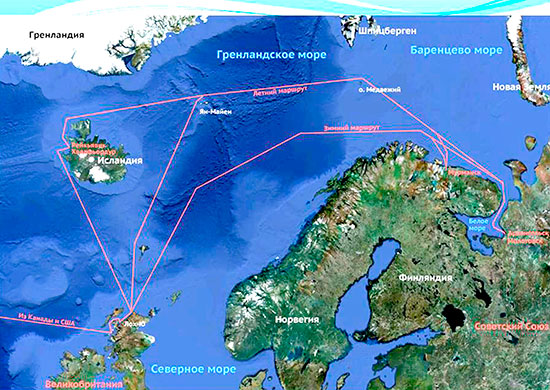
Russian map showing Arctic convoy routes from Britain and Iceland, past Norway to the Barents Sea and northern Russian ports

After Operation Barbarossa, the German invasion of the USSR, began on 22 June 1941, the UK and USSR signed an agreement in July that they would "render each other assistance and support of all kinds in the present war against Hitlerite Germany". Before September 1941 the British had dispatched 450 aircraft, 22,000 long tons (22,000 t) of rubber, 3,000,000 pairs of boots and stocks of tin, aluminium, jute, lead and wool. In September British and US representatives travelled to Moscow to study Soviet requirements and their ability to meet them. The representatives of the three countries drew up a protocol in October 1941 to last until June 1942.

=== Signals intelligence ===
==== Ultra ====
The British Government Code and Cypher School (GC&CS) based at Bletchley Park housed a small industry of code-breakers and traffic analysts. By June 1941, the German Enigma machine Home Waters (Heimish) settings used by surface ships and U-boats could quickly be read. On 1 February 1942, the Enigma machines used in U-boats in the Atlantic and Mediterranean were changed but German ships and the U-boats in Arctic waters continued with the older Heimish (Hydra from 1942, Dolphin to the British). By mid-1941, British Y-stations were able to receive and read Luftwaffe W/T transmissions and give advance warning of Luftwaffe operations. In 1941, naval Headache personnel with receivers to eavesdrop on Luftwaffe wireless transmissions were embarked on warships.

=== B-Dienst ===
The rival German Beobachtungsdienst (B-Dienst, Observation Service) of the Kriegsmarine Marinenachrichtendienst (MND, Naval Intelligence Service) had broken several Admiralty codes and cyphers by 1939, which were used to help Kriegsmarine ships elude British forces and provide opportunities for surprise attacks. From June to August 1940, six British submarines were sunk in the Skaggerak using information gleaned from British wireless signals. In 1941, B-Dienst read signals from the Commander in Chief Western Approaches informing convoys of areas patrolled by U-boats, enabling the submarines to move into "safe" zones.

=== Arctic Ocean ===
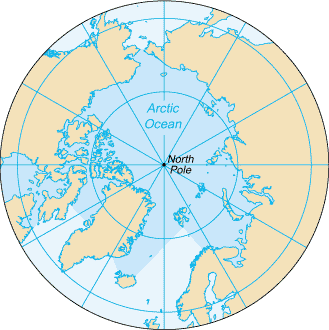
Diagram of the Arctic Ocean

Between Greenland and Norway are some of the most stormy waters of the world's oceans, 890 mi (1,440 km) of water under gales full of snow, sleet and hail. The cold Arctic water was met by the Gulf Stream, warm water from the Gulf of Mexico, which became the North Atlantic Drift. Arriving at the south-west of England the drift moves between Scotland and Iceland; north of Norway the drift splits. One stream bears north of Bear Island to Svalbard and a southern stream follows the coast of Murmansk into the Barents Sea. The mingling of cold Arctic water and warmer water of higher salinity generates thick banks of fog for convoys to hide in but the waters drastically reduced the effectiveness of ASDIC as U-boats moved in waters of differing temperatures and density.

In winter, polar ice can form as far south as 50 mi (80 km) off the North Cape and in summer it can recede to Svalbard. The area is in perpetual darkness in winter and permanent daylight in the summer and can make air reconnaissance almost impossible. Around the North Cape and in the Barents Sea the sea temperature rarely rises about 4° Celsius and a man in the water will die unless rescued immediately. The cold water and air makes spray freeze on the superstructure of ships, which has to be removed quickly to avoid the ship becoming top-heavy. Conditions in U-boats were, if anything, worse the boats having to submerge in warmer water to rid the superstructure of ice. Crewmen on watch were exposed to the elements, oil lost its viscosity, nuts froze and sheared off. Heaters in the hull were too demanding of current and could not be run continuously.

== Prelude ==
=== Kriegsmarine ===
German naval forces in Norway were commanded by Hermann Böhm, the Kommandierender Admiral Norwegen. Two U-boats were based in Norway in July 1941, with five destroyers and numerous smaller craft. There were four U-boats in September, five in December and four in January 1942. By mid-February twenty U-boats were anticipated in the region, with six based in Norway, two in Narvik or Tromsø, two at Trondheim and two at Bergen. Hitler had contemplated the establishment of a unified command but decided against it. The German battleship Tirpitz arrived at Trondheim on 16 January, the first ship of a general move of surface ships to Norway. British convoys to Russia had received little attention since they averaged only eight ships each and the long Arctic winter nights negated even the limited Luftwaffe effort that was available.

=== Luftflotte 5 ===
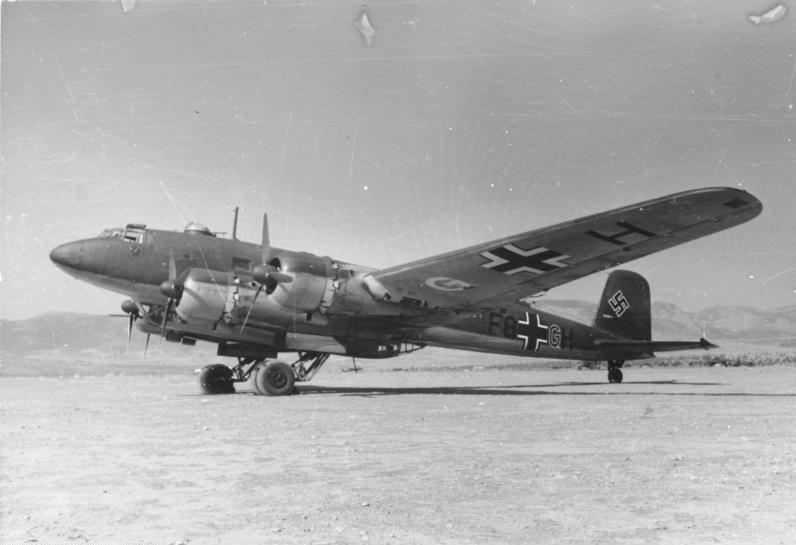
A Focke-Wulf Fw 200 Kondor of KG 40

In mid-1941, Luftflotte 5 (Air Fleet 5) had been re-organised for Operation Barbarossa with Luftgau Norwegen (Air Region Norway) headquartered in Oslo. Fliegerführer Stavanger (Air Commander Stavanger) central and northern Norway, Jagdfliegerführer Norwegen (Fighter Leader Norway) commanded the fighter force and Fliegerführer Kerkenes (Oberst [colonel] Andreas Nielsen) in the far north had airfields at Kirkenes and Banak. The Air Fleet had 180 aircraft, sixty of which were reserved for operations on the Karelian Front against the Red Army.

The distance from Banak to Arkhangelsk was 560 mi (900 km) and Fliegerführer Kerkenes had only ten Junkers Ju 88 bombers of Kampfgeschwader 30, thirty Junkers Ju 87 Stuka dive-bombers ten Messerschmitt Bf 109 fighters of Jagdgeschwader 77, five Messerschmitt Bf 110 heavy fighters of Zerstörergeschwader 76, ten reconnaissance aircraft and an anti-aircraft battalion. Sixty aircraft were far from adequate in such a climate and terrain where

...there is no favourable season for operations. (Earl Ziemke [1959] in Claasen [2001])

The emphasis of air operations changed from army support to anti-shipping operations only after March 1942, when Allied Arctic convoys becoming larger and more frequent coincided with the reinforcement of Norway with ships and aircraft and the less extreme climatic conditions of the Arctic summer.

=== Arctic convoys ===
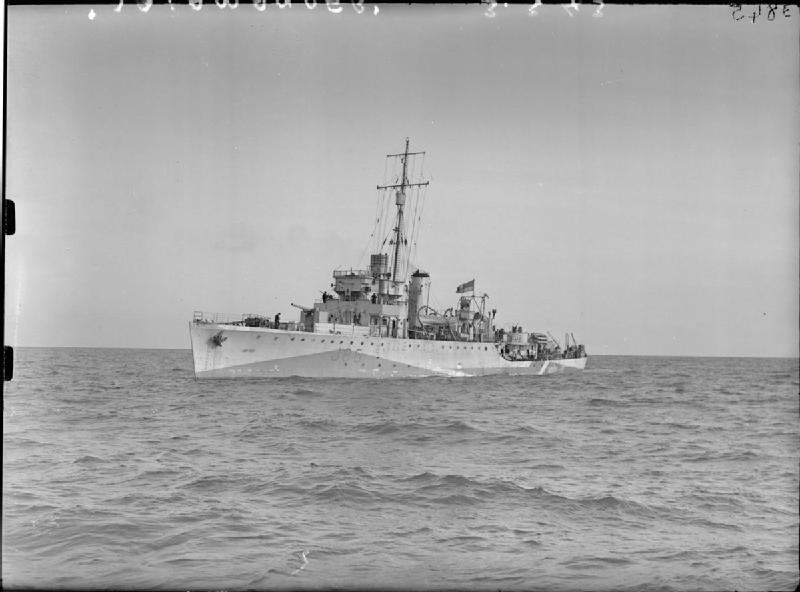
HMS Salamander a Halcyon-class minesweeper

A convoy was defined as at least one merchant ship sailing under the protection of at least one warship. At first the British had intended to run convoys to Russia on a forty-day cycle (the number of days between convoy departures) during the winter of 1941–1942 but this was shortened to a ten-day cycle. The round trip to Murmansk for warships was three weeks and each convoy needed a cruiser and two destroyers, which severely depleted the Home Fleet. Convoys left port and rendezvoused with the escorts at sea. A cruiser provided distant cover from a position to the west of Bear Island.

Air support was limited to 330 Squadron and 269 Squadron, RAF Coastal Command from Iceland, with some help from anti-submarine patrols from Sullom Voe, in Shetland, along the coast of Norway. Anti-submarine trawlers escorted the convoys on the first part of the outbound journey. Built for Arctic conditions, the trawlers were coal-burning ships with sufficient endurance. The trawlers were commanded by their peacetime crews and captains with the rank of Skipper, Royal Naval Reserve (RNR), who were used to Arctic conditions, supplemented by anti-submarine specialists of the Royal Naval Volunteer Reserve (RNVR). British minesweepers based at Arkhangelsk met the convoys to join the escort for the remainder of the voyage.

== Convoy PQ 1 ==
=== Voyage ===
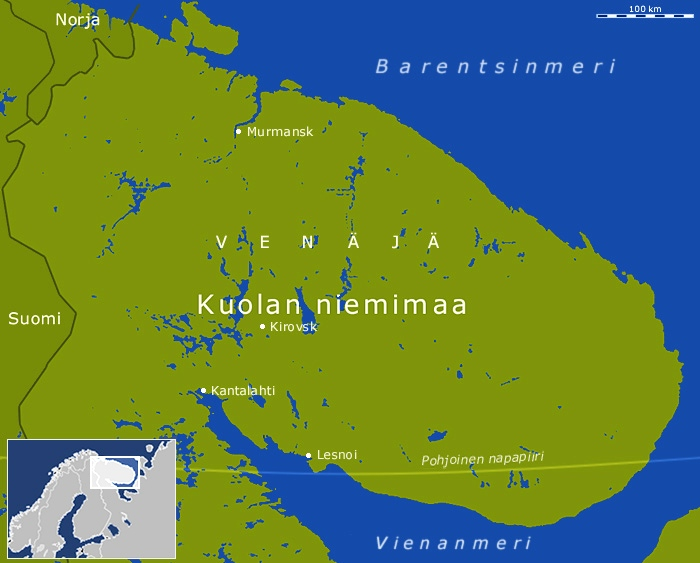
Murmansk on the Kola Inlet

The code prefix PQ was chosen from the initials of Commander Phillip Quellyn Roberts, an operations officer in the Admiralty. The convoy consisted of the British merchant ships Atlantic, Blairnevis, Elna II, Harmonic, Gemstone, whose crew refuse to sail until extra blankets were provided, Lorca, River Afton and the fleet oiler, Black Ranger; the Panamanian ship Capira and the Belgian Ville d'Anvers also sailed on 28 September 1941. The ships were loaded with raw materials, twenty tanks and 193 crated Hurricane fighter aircraft.

The escorts were County-class heavy cruiser HMS Suffolk, the destroyer HMS Impulsive and the Halcyon-class minesweepers HMS Britomart, Leda, Hussar and HMS Gossamer, en route to the base at Kola Inlet. Other ships were present at some stages of the voyage. North King suffered an engine failure but its engine room crew got it going again, despite the stormy conditions. The ships arrived at Arkhangelsk a day early, on 11 October, having sailed through the almost permanent dark of the Arctic winter.

== Aftermath ==
=== Analysis ===
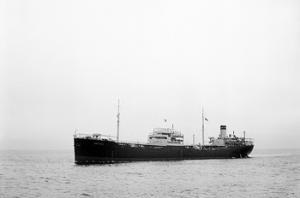
The fleet oiler RFA Abbeydale of the same class as RFA Aldersdale

Convoy PQ 1 arrived at Arkhangelsk without loss as Convoy QP 1 departed the port. The Germans paid scant attention to the first eleven British convoys before March 1942, which averaged only eight ships each. (Note: Some cargo had been stored badly, that loaded at Glasgow in particular.) In the winter darkness the Luftwaffe had great difficulty in finding Allied convoys, which made air attacks on Murmansk and the railway south more practical. From Operation Dervish to Convoy PQ 5, having only five torpedo boats (small destroyers) that were not suited to operations in Arctic waters there were no attacks by the Kriegsmarine

As the Allied supply effort increased in 1942, the Arctic route carrying 1.2 million tons of supplies of the total of 2.3 million tons delivered, the reinforcement of the Luftwaffe and Kriegsmarine led to German countermeasures growing in extent and effect. To protect return convoys and sweep for mines, the commander of the Home Fleet, John Tovey, established a force of ocean-going, Halcyon-class minesweepers at the Kola naval base, which had the speed, armament and anti-submarine capacity similar to that of Flower-class corvettes. As specialist vessels, the minesweepers usually had experienced career officers. The fleet oiler, RFA Aldersdale, had arrived with Operation Dervish (21–31 August 1941), to stay at Kola to fuel ships for the return journey. Soviet destroyers at Polyarnoe were available to reinforce convoy escorts for the last part of the journey.

=== Subsequent operations ===
From Operation Dervish, at the end of August 1941, the first convoy which comprised seven ships, to 20 December, six more convoys (Convoy PQ 1 to Convoy PQ 6) sent 45 ships, all of which reached Arkhangelsk or Murmansk. German awareness of these and the reciprocal westbound convoys (Convoy QP 1 to Convoy QP 4) was too vague to plan attacks on the convoys by the Kriegsmarine or the Luftwaffe. On 13 November 1941, the commander-in-chief of the Kriegsmarine, Großadmiral (Grand Admiral) Erich Raeder, told Hitler that, owing to the extreme weather and the lack of air reconnaissance, the prospects of the small number of U-boats in the Arctic Ocean were poor.

== List of ships ==
=== Merchant ships ===
Convoyed ships
Ship	year	Flag	GRT	P'n	Notes
SS Atlantic	1939	Merchant Navy	5,414	21	Captain D. Ridley, Convoy Commodore
SS Blairnevis	1930	Merchant Navy	4,155	12	
SS Capira	1920	Panama	5,625	11	
SS Elna II	1903	Soviet Union	3,221	41	
SS Gemstone	1938	Merchant Navy	4,986	33	
SS Harmonic	1930	Merchant Navy	4,558	42	
SS Lorca	1931	Merchant Navy	4,875	23	
SS North King	1903	Panama	4,934	31	
SS River Afton	1935	Merchant Navy	5,479	32	
SS Ville d'Anvers	1920	Belgium	7,462	22	Captain J. Spears
Fleet oiler
RFA Black Ranger	1941	Royal Fleet Auxiliary	3,417	43	Detached 4 October to Convoy QP 1

=== Sailing order ===
Convoy formation (Note: Convoys had a standard formation of short columns, number 1 to the left in the direction of travel. Each position in the column was numbered; 11 was the first ship in column 1 and 12 was the second ship in the column; 21 was the first ship in column 2.)
column 1	column 2	column 3	column 4
11 Capira	21 Atlantic	31 North King	41 Elna II
12 Blairnevis	22 Ville d'Anvers	32 River Afton	42 Harmonic
13 —	23 Llorca	33 Gemstone	43 RFA Black Ranger

=== Escorts ===
Convoy escorts
Ship	Flag	Type	Notes
Oceanic escort
HMS Suffolk	Royal Navy	County-class cruiser	Escort 29 September – 11 October
HMS Antelope	Royal Navy	A-class destroyer	Escort 29 September – 4 October, detached with Black Ranger
HMS Anthony	Royal Navy	A-class destroyer	Escort 29 September – 2 October
HMS Impulsive	Royal Navy	I-class destroyer	Escort 29 September – 11 October
HMS Britomart	Royal Navy	Halcyon-class minesweeper	Escort 29 September – 11 October
HMS Gossamer	Royal Navy	Halcyon-class minesweeper	Escort 29 September – 11 October
HMS Hussar	Royal Navy	Halcyon-class minesweeper	Escort 29 September – 11 October
HMS Leda	Royal Navy	Halcyon-class minesweeper	Escort 29 September – 11 October
Later escort
HMS Escapade	Royal Navy	E-class destroyer	Escort 2–11 October
Eastern local escort
Valerian Kuybyshev	Soviet Navy	Orfey-class destroyer	Escort 10–11 October
Uritski	Soviet Navy	Orfey-class destroyer	Escort 10–11 October
HMS Harrier	Royal Navy	Halcyon-class minesweeper	Escort 10–11 October
