= John Dowding =

John or Jack Dowding may refer to:

- John Dowding (Royal Navy officer) (1891–1965), British naval officer of the First and Second World Wars
- Jack Dowding (footballer) (1881–1960), Australian rules football player
- John Dowding (figure skater) (born 1957), Canadian Olympic skater
