= Operation Dervish (1941) =

WWII Arctic Convoy to the Soviet Union

- Part of Arctic naval operations of the Second World War
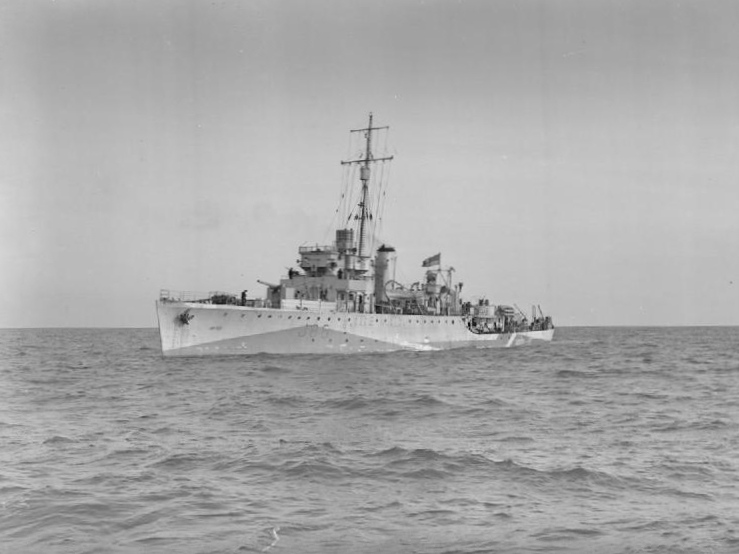
- The minesweeper HMS Salamander was part of the escort for the convoy as it reached its destination
Date	21–31 August 1941
Location	Arctic Ocean
Result	Allied victory

Belligerents
United Kingdom; Soviet Union	Germany

Commanders and leaders
Robert 'Bullshit Bob' Burnett	Rolf Carls

Strength
6 merchantmen; 1 fleet oiler; 14 escorts (in relays)	

Casualties and losses
Nil	Nil

Operation Dervish (21–31 August 1941) was the first of the Arctic Convoys of the Second World War by which the Western Allies supplied material to the Soviet Union against Nazi Germany. Included in the convoy was the personnel and equipment of an RAF Wing, for the air defence of the Russian ports, several civilians and diplomatic missions.

The convoy sailed from Liverpool on 12 August 1941 and arrived at Arkhangelsk on 31 August 1941. There were no attempts by the Luftwaffe or the Kriegsmarine to intercept the convoy and neither side suffered casualties.

Co-incident with the Dervish convoy, civilians in the Svalbard archipelago were evacuated in Operation Gauntlet (25 August – 3 September 1941) and Dervish was followed by Operation Strength (30 August – 14 September 1941) to transport aircraft for No. 151 Wing RAF at Arkhangelsk; both operations succeeded.

== Background ==
=== British–Soviet alliance ===
On 22 June 1941, the Soviet Union was invaded by Nazi Germany and its allies. That evening, Winston Churchill broadcast a promise of assistance to the USSR against the common enemy. On 7 July, Churchill wrote to Stalin and ordered the British ambassador in Moscow, Stafford Cripps, to begin discussions for a treaty of mutual assistance. On 12 July, an Anglo-Soviet Agreement was signed in Moscow, to fight together and not make a separate peace. On the same day a Soviet commission met the Royal Navy and the RAF in London and it was decided to use the airfield at Vaenga (now Severomorsk) as a fighter base to defend ships unloading at the ports of Murmansk, Arkhangelsk and Polyarny. The First Sea Lord, Admiral Dudley Pound considered such proposals unsound, "with the dice loaded against us in every direction". When Arctic convoys passed by the north of Norway into the Barents Sea, they came well into range of German aircraft, U-boats and ships operating from bases in Norway and Finland. The ports of arrival, especially Murmansk, only about 15 mi (24 km) east of the front line were vulnerable to attack by the Luftwaffe.

=== Lend-lease ===
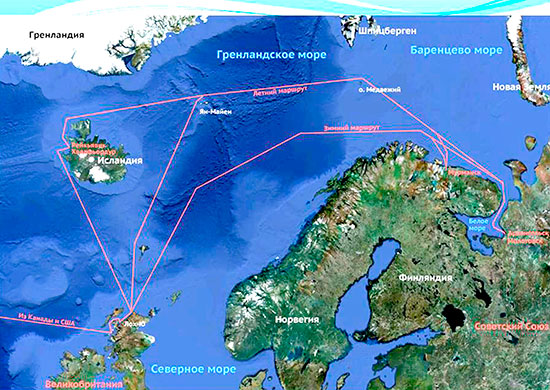
Russian map showing Arctic convoy routes from Britain and Iceland, past Norway to the Barents Sea and northern Russian ports

After Operation Barbarossa, the German invasion of the USSR, began on 22 June 1941, the UK and USSR signed an agreement in July that they would "render each other assistance and support of all kinds in the present war against Hitlerite Germany". The USSR turned out to lack the ships and escorts and the British and Americans, who had made a commitment to "help with the delivery", undertook to deliver the supplies for want of an alternative. (In September, after the arrival of Dervish, the main Soviet need in 1941 was military equipment to replace losses because two large aircraft factories were being moved east from Leningrad and two more from Ukraine. It would take at least eight months to resume production, until when, aircraft output would fall from 80 to 30 aircraft per day. Britain and the US undertook to send 400 aircraft a month, at a ratio of three bombers to one fighter (later reversed), 500 tanks a month and 300 Bren gun carriers. The Anglo-Americans also undertook to send 42,000 long tons (43,000 t) of aluminium and 3,862 machine tools, along with sundry raw materials, food and medical supplies.

=== Arctic route ===
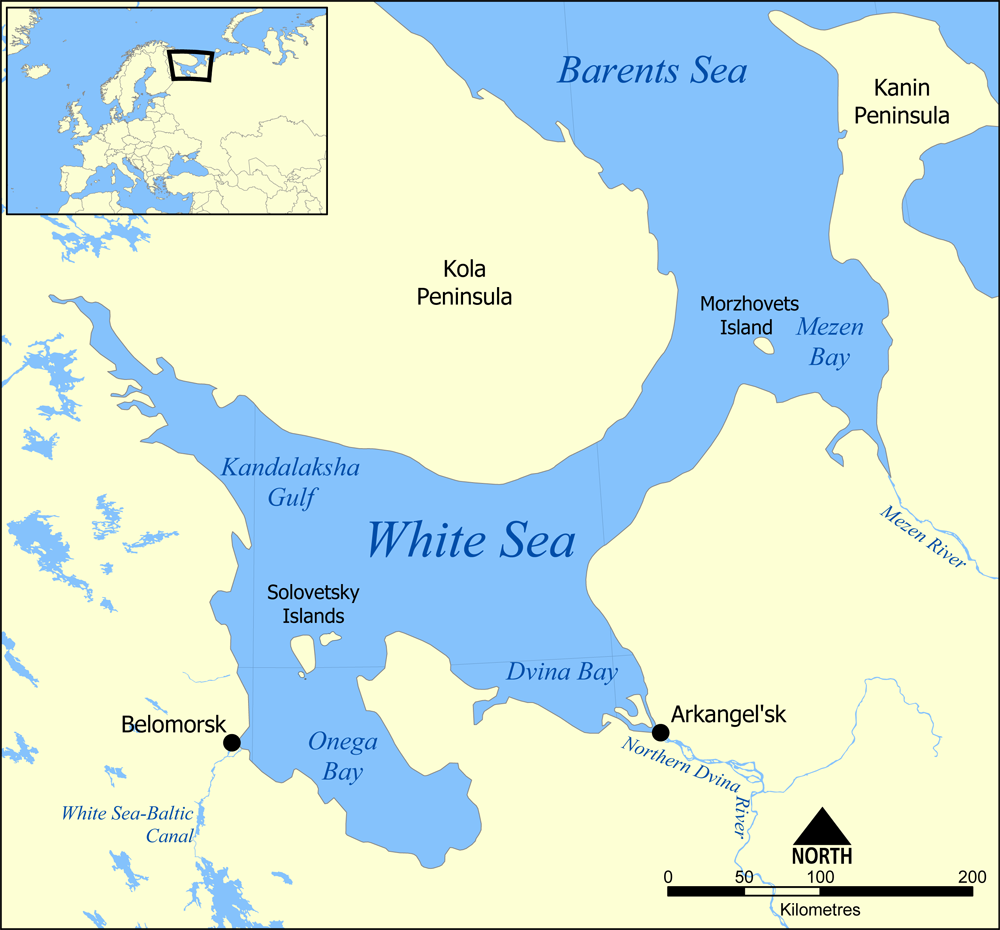
Map showing the White Sea and the Gulf of Arkhangelsk

The transport of supplies to the USSR was more difficult than any of the other theatres of war. Limitations of geography, climate and the nature of sea transport were extremely difficult to overcome but until ports in the Persian Gulf and the overland rail route through Iran were improved, the Arctic route was the only feasible one, apart from the small amount of supplies being sent via ports in the Soviet Far East. The entrepôts of Murmansk and those in the White Sea had not been built for mass cargoes of military equipment.

There were few cranes and none of them were capable of lifting heavy items. Rail links were inadequate, some berths not having rail connexions. (Note: It took six weeks to unload a 68 long tons (69 t) piece of machinery from a US ship, using a 35 long tons (36 t) crane to lift each end in turn, baulks of wood being jammed underneath each time, until the machinery had sixty lorry-loads of wood underneath.) The gulf ports were iced from the end of November to the end of May. Further from the front line than Murmansk [30 mi (48 km) by the autumn of 1941] the Soviet authorities claimed that they could be kept open by ice-breakers but could only provide two of the eight to ten they promised and Stalin was bombed on 15 January 1942, leaving five British ships iced in until the spring.

=== Arctic Ocean ===
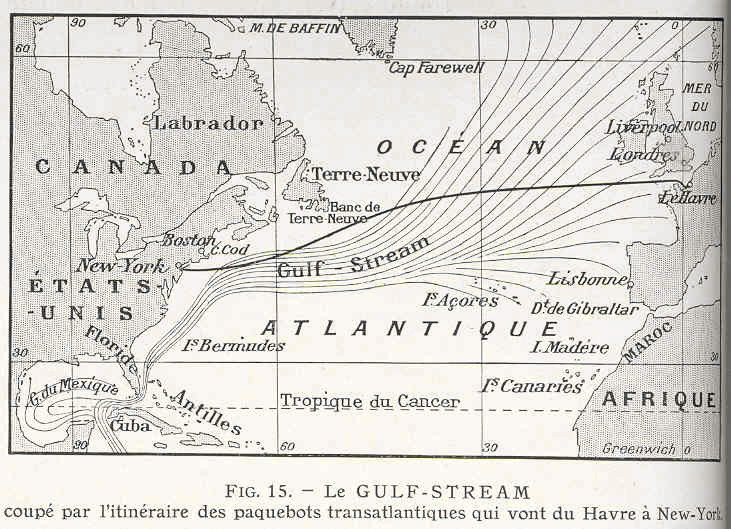
Diagrammatic representation of the course of the Gulf Stream

Between Greenland and Norway are some of the most stormy waters of the world's oceans, 890 mi (1,440 km) of water under gales full of snow, sleet and hail. The cold Arctic water was met by the Gulf Stream, warm water from the Gulf of Mexico, which became the North Atlantic Drift. Arriving at the south-west of England the drift moves between Scotland and Iceland; north of Norway the drift splits. One stream bears north of Bear Island to Svalbard and a southern stream follows the coast of Murmansk into the Barents Sea. The mingling of cold Arctic water and warmer water of higher salinity generates thick banks of fog for convoys to hide in but the waters drastically reduced the effectiveness of ASDIC as U-boats moved in waters of differing temperatures and density.

In winter, polar ice can form as far south as 50 mi (80 km) off the North Cape and in summer it can recede to Svalbard. The area is in perpetual darkness in winter and permanent daylight in the summer and can make air reconnaissance almost impossible. Around the North Cape and in the Barents Sea the sea temperature rarely rises above 4° Celsius and a man in the water will die unless rescued immediately. The cold water and air makes spray freeze on the superstructure of ships, which has to be removed quickly to avoid the ship becoming top-heavy. Conditions in U-boats were, if anything, worse, the boats having to submerge in warmer water to rid the superstructure of ice. Crewmen on watch were exposed to the elements, oil lost its viscosity, nuts froze and sheared off. Heaters in the hull were too demanding of current and could not be run continuously.

== Prelude ==
=== Plans ===
The Dervish convoy was part of a series of operations in the Arctic during August 1941. In July the British had conducted Operation EF, an attack on the ports of Kirkenes and Petsamo by carrier aircraft, while the fast minelayer HMS Adventure had run to Arkhangelsk with a cargo of parachute mines. At the end of July a cruiser force commanded by Rear Admiral Philip Vian had investigated the Spitzbergen archipelago for signs of German activity and had destroyed a weather station on Hope Island. In August a convoy of six ships loaded with war materiel was to sail to Arkhangelsk, together with a contingent of RAF personnel to prepare the way for Operation Strength, a plan to fly 48 Hurricane fighters from the aircraft carrier HMS Argus to airfields in Russia in a similar manner to the Club Run operations in the Mediterranean. At the same time Vian was to return to Spitzbergen and evacuate the population in Operation Gauntlet.

=== Ships ===
The convoy consisted of the merchant ships Lancastrian Prince, New Westminster City, Esneh, Trehata, the elderly (ex-Union Castle liner) SS Llanstephan Castle, the fleet oiler RFA Aldersdale and the Dutch freighter Alchiba. The convoy carried wool, rubber and tin and 24 crated Hawker Hurricane fighter aircraft. Captain John Dowding Royal Naval Reserve (RNR) was Convoy Commodore in Llanstephan Castle, which carried most of the 2,700 men of 151 Wing Royal Air Force (RAF), including fourteen pilots. There were several civilians, including Vernon Bartlett MP, the US newspaper reporter Wallace Carrol, the Polish expressionist painter and official British and Polish war artist Feliks Topolski, a Polish legation, a Czechoslovak commission and Charlotte Haldane, a noted feminist and member of the Communist Party of Great Britain, who lectured on Domestic life in Russia as part of an impromptu course laid on by the civilians.

The convoy was protected by an ocean escort comprising the destroyer Electra and the Anti-submarine warfare trawlers Hamlet and Macbeth. The ocean escort was joined later by the destroyers Active and Impulsive and the trawler Ophelia. The escorts were supported in the first and second stages of the voyage by the anti-aircraft auxiliary ship Pozarica and the trawlers Celia, St. Cathan and Le Tiger. The second relay escorts were replaced by the third relay with Halcyon and Harrier the Halcyon-class minesweepers that had been posted to north Russia as a local escort force. The convoy was also accompanied by the cruiser Aurora, en route to join the force for Operation Gauntlet. The operations were supported by a Distant Cover Force from the Home Fleet, the carrier HMS Victorious and the cruisers Devonshire and Suffolk, with the destroyers Eclipse, Escapade and Inglefield.

=== Luftflotte 5 ===
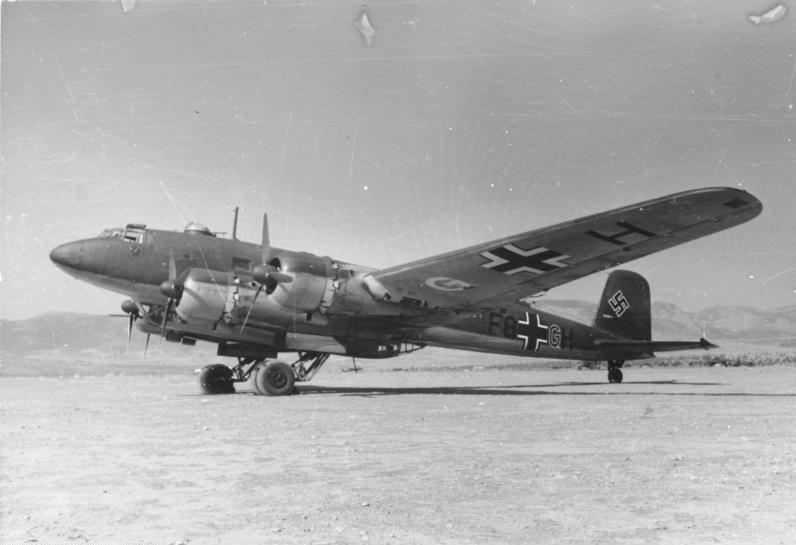
A Focke-Wulf Fw 200 Kondor of KG 40

In mid-1941, Luftflotte 5 (Air Fleet 5) had been re-organised for Operation Barbarossa with Luftgau Norwegen (Air Region Norway) headquartered in Oslo. Fliegerführer Stavanger (Air Commander Stavanger) was responsible for the centre and north of Norway, Jagdfliegerführer Norwegen (Fighter Leader Norway) commanded the fighter force and Fliegerführer Kerkenes (Oberst [colonel] Andreas Nielsen) in the far north had airfields at Kirkenes and Banak. The Air Fleet had 180 aircraft, sixty of which were reserved for operations on the Karelian Front against the Red Army. The distance from Banak to Arkhangelsk was 560 mi (900 km) and Fliegerführer Kerkenes had only ten Junkers Ju 88 bombers of Kampfgeschwader 30, thirty Junkers Ju 87 Stuka dive-bombers, ten Messerschmitt Bf 109 fighters of Jagdgeschwader 77, five Messerschmitt Bf 110 heavy fighters of Zerstörergeschwader 76, ten reconnaissance aircraft and an anti-aircraft battalion. Sixty aircraft were far from adequate in such a climate and terrain where "there is no favourable season for operations".

== Voyage ==
The convoy sailed for Scapa Flow in the Orkney Islands from Liverpool on 12 August 1941 and arrived on 16 August. Another fifteen Hurricanes packed in crates were loaded on the other ships at Scapa Flow. The ships departed from Scapa Flow on 17 August and the convoy reached Hvalfjord in Iceland on 20 August, departing for Russia the next day. The Gauntlet force departed Scapa Flow on 19 August and rendezvoused with the cruiser Aurora, which had been sailing with the Dervish convoy. The Distant Covering Force sailed on 24 August, taking station near Bear Island (Bjørnøya) to cover all operations against surface attack by the German Navy. The convoy sailed towards the Svalbard Archipelago and the midnight sun, to circle as far north around Norway as possible. The danger of Luftwaffe attacks on Murmansk led to the ships being diverted to Arkhangelsk, another 400 mi (640 km) to the east.

The ships were escorted from the Kanin Noss promontory through the White Sea by the Soviet ships Sokrushitelny, Grozny, Kujbyshev and the Orfey-class destroyer Uritsky. As Llanstephan Castle sailed upriver to dock, rifle shots were heard and a member of the crew was hit in the arm, the gunfire coming from people onshore, who mistook the British uniforms for German ones. The Gauntlet force departed Spitzbergen on 3 August, returning to Scapa Flow on 10 September. The Strength force sailed on 30 August, as the Dervish convoy was arriving and reached the flying-off point on 7 September. This was accomplished and the force returned to port on 14 September. The Distant Cover Force returned at the same time, after launching air attacks on targets in occupied Norway.

== Other operations ==
=== Operation Gauntlet ===
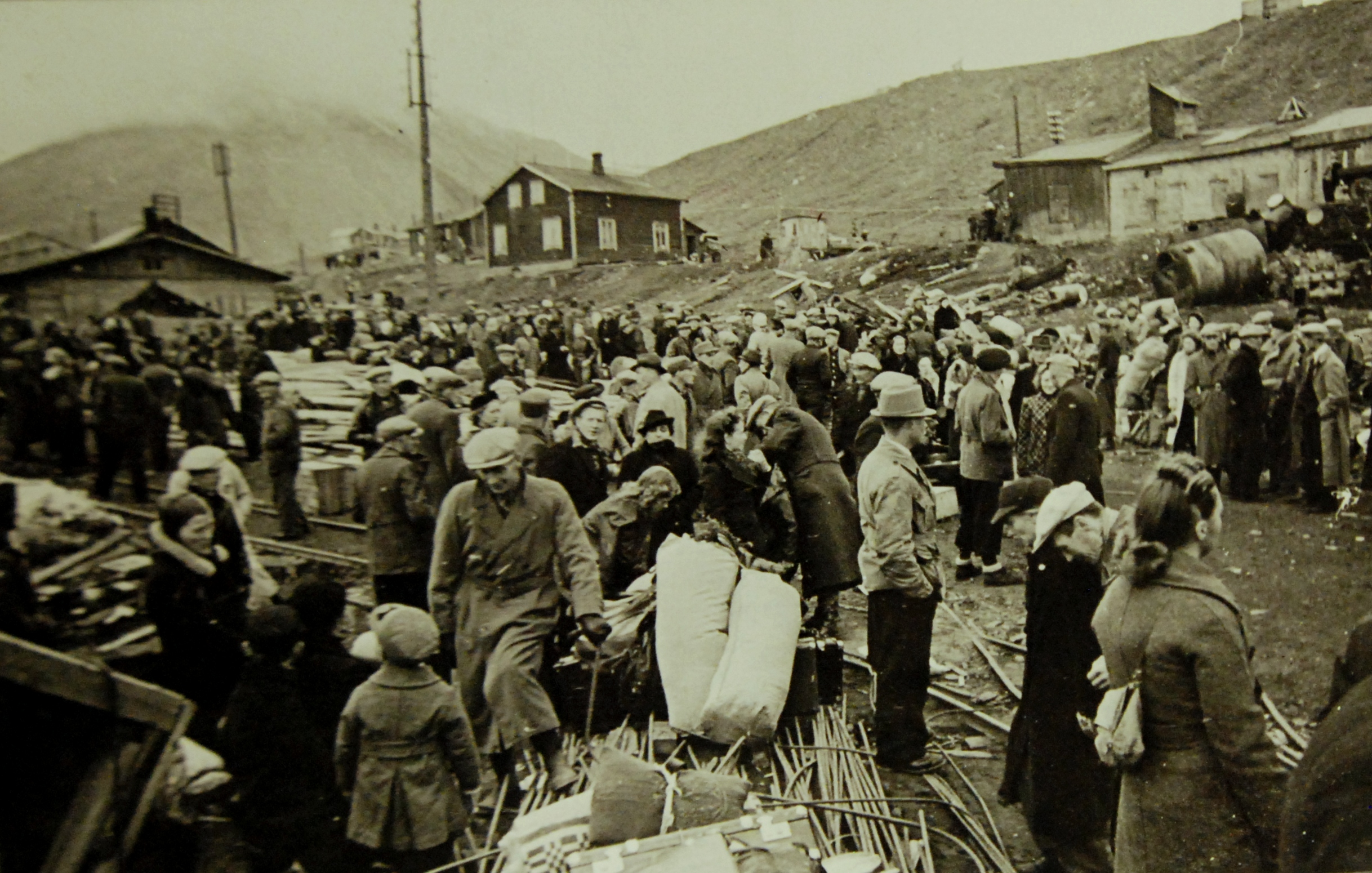
Norwegian population readying for evacuation from Longyearbyen

Operation Gauntlet was an Allied Combined Operation to land on the Spitzbergen archipelago, to evacuate Norwegian and Soviet civilians there and to destroy facilities to deny them to the Germans. A force of two cruisers and four destroyers, with the troopship Empress of Canada and a replenishment oiler left British waters on 19 August 1941, arriving at Spitzbergen on 25 August. After evacuating Soviet coal miners at Barentsburg and Norwegians at Longyearbyen, the coal mining and shipping infrastructure, equipment and stores there were destroyed. The Allies also suppressed wireless stations on the archipelago, to prevent the Germans receiving weather reports. The Allies departed the archipelago on 3 September having suffered no casualties, the local civilians were repatriated, several ships were taken as prizes and Bremse, a German gunnery training ship, was sunk on the return journey.

=== Operation Strength ===
The old aircraft carrier Argus (launched in 1917) took part in Operation Strength (30 August – 14 September) with the heavy cruiser Shropshire and the destroyers HMS Matabele, Punjabi and Somali, protected by the Dervish covering force. Strength ferried pilots, their 24 Hurricanes and other personnel of 151 Wing RAF to Russia; the Hurricanes were flown off Argus direct to Vaenga airfield, near Murmansk for Operation Benedict. The ships reached the flying-off point safely due to the scarcity of Luftwaffe reconnaissance aircraft in the region. Normal naval aircraft used a ramp at the end of the flight deck to help get into the air but the Hurricane undercarriage was not robust enough and the first two Hurricanes to take off were damaged. The rest of the aircraft avoided the ramp and the damaged Hurricanes crashed on landing at Vaenga.

== Aftermath ==
Dervish was followed by a regular series of convoys numbered like their Atlantic counterparts. The first homeward-bound convoy, QP 1 included the Dervish merchant ships, carrying Polish troops stranded in the USSR, left Arkhangelsk on 28 September 1941 and arrived at Scapa Flow on 9 October. The eleven ships of Convoy PQ 1, the first convoy of the PQ series, carrying twenty tanks, 193 fighter aircraft and other cargo, sailed from Iceland on 28 September, arriving at Arkhangelsk on 11 October after an uneventful trip.

== Commemoration ==
The operation is often remembered in both countries as an example of direct co-operation between of British Armed Forces and the Red Army. The British Prime Minister and Minister of Defence, Winston Churchill, said that the operation and the larger convoys were "the worst journey in the world". Many veterans of the operation have since 2012 been awarded the Arctic Star for their service. In August 2016, on the occasion of the 75th anniversary of the start of the Operation, Princess Anne visited Arkhangelsk to celebrate as a guest of Governor Igor Orlov. The Princess gave a speech and met Russian and British veterans of the operation. A Band of the Royal Marines performed alongside a military band from the Northern Fleet after a wreath laying ceremony.

== Allied order of battle ==
=== Merchant ships ===
Convoyed ships
Ship	Year	Flag	GRT	Notes
RFA Aldersdale	1937	Royal Navy	8,402	Replenishment oiler
SS Alchiba	1920	Netherlands	4,427	
SS Esneh	1919	Merchant Navy	1,931	
SS Lancastrian Prince	1940	Merchant Navy	1,914	
SS Llanstephan Castle	1914	Merchant Navy	11,348	Convoy Commodore
SS New Westminster City	1929	Merchant Navy	4,747	
SS Trehata	1928	Merchant Navy	4,817	

=== Escorts (in relays) ===
Allied escort forces
Ship	Flag	Type	Notes
Liverpool to Iceland via Scapa Flow
HMT Celia	Royal Navy	Shakespearian-class trawler	12–20 August, Iceland and Ocean escort 21–31 August
HMT Le Tiger	Royal Navy	ASW Trawler	12–20 August, Iceland and Ocean escort 21–31 August
HMS Pozarica	Royal Navy	Anti-aircraft cruiser	12–20 August, Iceland and Ocean escort 21–31 August
HMT St. Cathan	Royal Navy	ASW Trawler	12–20 August, Iceland and Ocean escort 21–31 August
Ocean escort
HMS Pozarica	Royal Navy	Anti-aircraft cruiser	12–21 August, Iceland and Ocean escort 21–31 August
HMS Active	Royal Navy	A-class destroyer	16–29 August, Iceland and Ocean escort
HMS Electra	Royal Navy	E-class destroyer	12–29 August, Ocean escort
HMS Impulsive	Royal Navy	I-class destroyer	16–20 August Iceland and Ocean escort 21–31 August
HMT Celia	Royal Navy	Shakespearian-class trawler	12–21 August, Iceland and Ocean escort 21–31 August
HMT Hamlet	Royal Navy	Shakespearian-class trawler	12–21 August, Iceland and Ocean escort 21–31 August
HMT Macbeth	Royal Navy	Shakespearian-class trawler	12–21 August, Iceland and Ocean escort 21–31 August
HMT Ophelia	Royal Navy	Shakespearian-class trawler	19–31 August, Ocean escort
HMT Le Tiger	Royal Navy	ASW Trawler	12–21 August, Iceland and Ocean escort 21–31 August
HMT St. Cathan	Royal Navy	ASW Trawler	12–21 August, Iceland and Ocean escort 21–31 August
Distant cover (Home Fleet) 24 August – 14 September
HMS Victorious	Royal Navy	Illustrious-class aircraft carrier	Flagship, Rear-Admiral Frederic Wake-Walker
HMS Devonshire	Royal Navy	County-class cruiser	
HMS Suffolk	Royal Navy	County-class cruiser	
HMS Eclipse	Royal Navy	E-class destroyer	
HMS Escapade	Royal Navy	E-class destroyer	
HMS Inglefield	Royal Navy	I-class destroyer	
Eastern local escort
HMS Halcyon	Royal Navy	Halcyon-class minesweeper	20–31 August
HMS Harrier	Royal Navy	Halcyon-class minesweeper	20–31 August
HMS Salamander	Royal Navy	Halcyon-class minesweeper	20–31 August

=== Concurrent operations ===
Operations during Dervish
Ship	Flag	Type	Notes
Operation Gauntlet (19 August – 7 September)
HMS Aurora	Royal Navy	Arethusa-class cruiser	
HMS Nigeria	Royal Navy	Fiji-class cruiser	Flagship, Rear-Admiral Philip Vian
HMS Antelope	Royal Navy	A-class destroyer	
HMS Anthony	Royal Navy	A-class destroyer	
HMS Icarus	Royal Navy	I-class destroyer	
RMS Empress of Canada	Royal Fleet Auxiliary	Troopship	
RFA Oligarch	Royal Fleet Auxiliary	oiler	
Operation Strength (30 August – 14 September)
HMS Argus	Royal Navy	Aircraft carrier	Ferrying 24 Hurricane fighter aircraft to the USSR
HMS Shropshire	Royal Navy	County-class cruiser	
HMS Matabele	Royal Navy	Tribal-class destroyer	
HMS Punjabi	Royal Navy	Tribal-class destroyer	
HMS Somali	Royal Navy	Tribal-class destroyer	
