= HMS Macbeth =

Two ships of the Royal Navy were named Macbeth -

- HMS Macbeth (1906), a minesweeper that was sold into civil service post-World War I and was lost in 1930 near Île-d'Houat.
- HMS Macbeth (1940), a naval trawler in service during World War II
