= HMT Horatio (T153) =

History

United Kingdom
- Name: Horatio
- Ordered: 12 December 1939
- Builder: Cook, Welton & Gemmell, Beverley, UK
- Laid down: 12 March 1940
- Launched: 8 August 1940
- Commissioned: 17 January 1941
- Identification: Pennant number: T 153
- Fate: Torpedoed and sunk by a German E-boat near Bône, Algeria, 7 January 1943

General characteristics
- Class & type: Shakespearian-class naval trawler
- Displacement: 545 long tons (554 t)
- Length: 164 ft (50 m)
- Propulsion: Triple expansion steam engine, 1 shaft
- Speed: 12 knots (22 km/h; 14 mph)
- Crew: 35
- Armament: 1 × 12 pounder 76 mm (3.0 in) gun; 3 × Oerlikon 20 mm AA guns; 30 × depth charges

Horatio was a Shakespearian-class naval trawler, launched on 8 August 1940. She served in World War II as a minesweeper and was sunk by the German motor torpedo boat S-58 off Cap de Garde, near Bône, Algeria. Two crew members survived the sinking and were captured by the German navy.

== Description ==
Ships of the Shakespearian class were 164 feet (50 m) long, displaced 545 long tons (554 t) and had a complement of about 35. They were generally armed with a 12-pounder 76 mm (3.0 in) quick firing low angle gun and three 20mm Oerlikons in single mountings. A single boiler and triple expansion machinery provided 950 indicated horsepower (710 kW) to a single shaft, giving a speed of 12 knots (22 km/h; 14 mph).

== History ==
Horatio was ordered on 12 December 1939. She was built by Cook, Welton & Gemmell, of Beverley. Her keel was laid on 12 March 1940 and she was launched on 8 August 1940.

Horatio was commissioned on 17 January 1941, carrying the pennant number T153. Temporary Acting Lieutenant Commander Charles Robertson took command on 24 January, but apparently was killed in an accident only four days later. Command was taken up by Acting Lieutenant Commander Henry Silvester Warren on 20 February 1941. Around April of the same year, Horatio received a new commanding officer, Temporary Lieutenant Charles Alfred Lemkey, who was to remain the trawler's captain for remainder of its career.

The trawler took part in a number of convoys during World War II.

On 7 July 1942, Leading Seaman William Harold Leon Simpson RNPS was awarded the Distinguished Service Medal for "courage and steadfastness in beating off an attack on H.M.T. Horatio by two groups of three enemy aircraft, destroying one aircraft and seriously damaging another."

On 7 January 1943 Horatio was sunk by the German motor torpedo boat S-58 off Cap de Garde, near Bône, Algeria. Two crew members survived the sinking and were captured by the German navy. The full list of 32 sailors lost in the sinking of Horatio was published in the Times on 24 November 1943.
