= SS River Afton =

Coordinates: 75°57′N 43°00′E

History

United Kingdom
- Name: SS River Afton
- Operator: Campbell Brothers & Co, Newcastle-upon-Tyne
- Builder: Lithgows, Port Glasgow, Scotland
- Completed: 1935
- Fate: Sunk on 5 July 1942

General characteristics
- Tonnage: 5,479 tons
- Capacity: 2,314 tons of military stores, 36 tanks, 12 vehicles and seven aircraft
- Crew: 64

SS River Afton was a steam merchant built in 1935 by Lithgows, of Port Glasgow, Scotland and homeported in Glasgow. She was operated by Campbell Brothers & Co, Newcastle-upon-Tyne. She was named after the River Afton in Ayrshire, Scotland.

== Wartime career ==
She was used in a number of Arctic convoys, to deliver supplies from the Western Allies to the Soviet Union. She took part in Convoy PQ 1 and Convoy PQ 13, and made the return voyages as part of Convoys QP 2 and QP 10. Her last voyage was with the ill-fated Convoy PQ 17 in June 1942.

Commanded by her master, Harold William Charlton, she sailed from Middlesbrough bound for Archangel via Reykjavík, carrying a cargo of 2,314 tons of military stores, 36 tanks, 12 vehicles and seven aircraft. She was the ship of the convoy commodore John C.K. Dowding. After dispersal of the convoy, River Afton was sighted by the German submarine U-703 at 21:02 on 5 July 1942, steaming north east of the Kola Peninsula. U-703 torpedoed the ship, causing significant damage. She sank after being hit by two more torpedoes at 21:05 and 21:22, which caused her to explode and break in two. 15 crew members, eight gunners, one passenger and two naval staff members went down with the ship. The master, the commodore, 31 crew members, one gunner, one passenger and three naval staff members were picked up by the Flower-class corvette HMS Lotus, and landed at Matochkin, in Novaya Zemlya.
