= John Dowding (Royal Navy officer) =

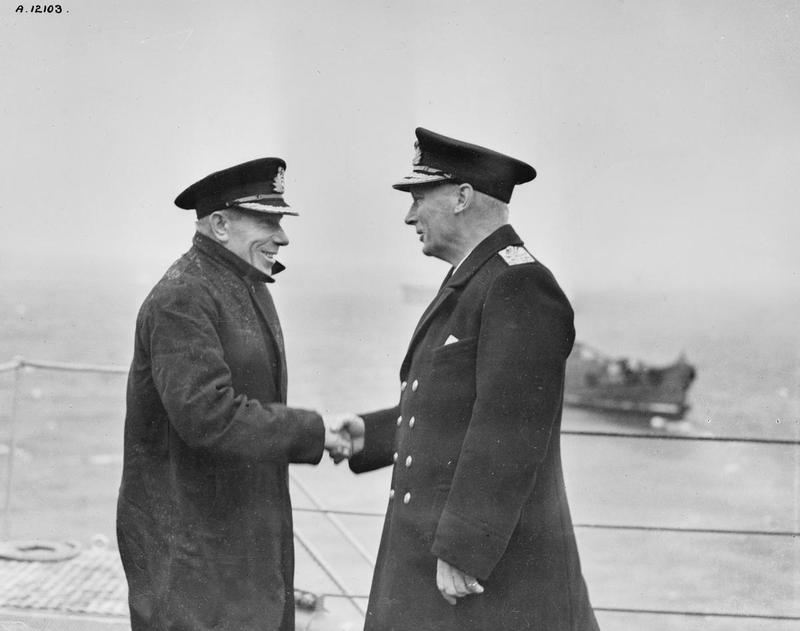
Dowding (left) shaking hands with Sir John Tovey in 1942, following his return from convoy QP 14

John Charles Keith Dowding CBE DSO (1 November 1891 – 13 February 1965) was a British naval officer during the 20th century. He served in both world wars and was awarded the DSO for his actions during the Dunkirk evacuation. He is best known for being the commodore in charge of the ill-fated Arctic convoy PQ 17.

== Early life ==
Jack Dowding was born on 1 November 1891 in Dibrugarh, British India, to Charles and Kathleen Dowding. His father was an Anglican clergyman, who served there before returning to England and residing at St John's in the Vale, Cumberland. Dowding was educated at St Bees School, in what is now Cumbria, and on the Mercantile Marine training ship HMS Conway. He became a probationary midshipman in the RNR, with seniority from August 1910, and joined the Mercantile Marine, earning his Second Mate's certificate in December 1913.

== Career ==
Dowding served in the Royal Navy during the First World War and served on HMS Otway, an armed merchant cruiser with the 10th Cruiser Squadron, a force employed in the Northern Patrol and responsible for enforcing the naval blockade of Germany. He later served as second-in-command of a destroyer, first in home waters and later in the Mediterranean. In 1919 he left the Royal Navy and was employed by the Orient Line operating between Britain and Australia.

With the outbreak of the Second World War Dowding was recalled to active service with the rank of commander and was appointed to HMS Mona's Isle, a Manx packet steamer requisitioned to serve as an armed boarding vessel. In June 1940 she took part in Operation Dynamo, the Dunkirk evacuation, making two trips under fire and bringing back over 2,600 troops. For his actions Dowding was awarded the DSO.

In December 1940 he was promoted to captain, and in April 1941 to commodore 2nd class, At the same time he was transferred to HMS Eaglet, the shore establishment at Liverpool responsible for Britain's convoy operations, and served as a convoy commodore.

Dowding served on several Atlantic convoys and made two trips to the Soviet Union on the notorious Kola Run. In August 1941 he was commodore to the Dervish convoy, the first supply convoy to the Soviets, returning with the Dervish ships in October in convoy QP 1. Both these voyages were accomplished safely and without loss.

In late June 1942 he was commodore to PQ 17. On 4 July he received the controversial Admiralty order to scatter the convoy, and it fell to him to carry this out. The result was a catalogue of ship losses over the next few days; Dowding's ship, River Afton, was sunk at midday on 5 July, leaving Dowding and two men on a raft in the icy waters for four hours until rescued by the corvette Lotus. He was taken to Novaya Zemlya where they gathered up two merchant ships and took them to safety at Arkhangelsk. Dowding immediately set out in the corvette Poppy to search for more survivors, eventually gathering a further five ships and the survivors of several more. Two months later Dowding was commodore to the returning QP 14, with the surviving ships from PQ 17; this convoy also came under attack, and Dowding was again cast adrift when his ship, Ocean Voice, was sunk. He was again rescued and returned to the UK, where he was awarded the CBE.

Later Dowding served on the naval staff for Operation Neptune, the naval component of the Normandy landings, first as Staff Flag Officer for the assault area, then as Principal Sea Transport Officer for the Expeditionary Force. He was Mentioned in Dispatches for this work, and was awarded the Order of the Crown of Belgium for his part in the liberation of that country.

His final naval posting was as the Naval Reserve's ADC to the king, from September 1945 until his retirement in November 1946.

== Later life and death ==
Jack Dowding died at Wokingham, in Berkshire, on 13 February 1965.
