= HMS Antelope (H36) =

A-class destroyer

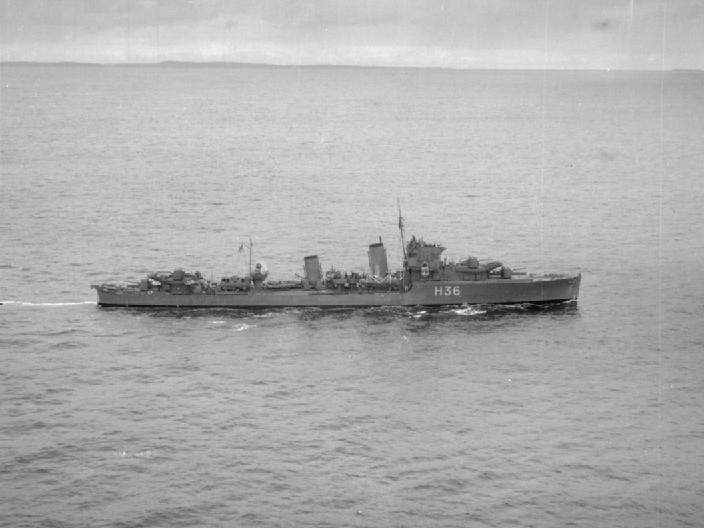
- HMS Antelope underway in coastal waters

History

United Kingdom
- Name: HMS Antelope
- Operator: Royal Navy
- Ordered: 6 March 1928
- Builder: Hawthorne Leslie
- Laid down: 11 July 1928
- Launched: 27 July 1929
- Commissioned: 20 March 1930
- Identification: Pennant number: H36
- Fate: Scrapped, 1946

General characteristics (as built)
- Class & type: A-class destroyer
- Displacement: 1,350 long tons (1,370 t) (standard); 1,773 long tons (1,801 t) (deep load)
- Length: 323 ft (98 m) (o/a)
- Beam: 32 ft 3 in (9.83 m)
- Draught: 12 ft 3 in (3.73 m)
- Installed power: 34,000 shp (25,000 kW); 3 × Admiralty 3-drum boilers
- Propulsion: 2 × shafts; 2 × geared steam turbines
- Speed: 35 knots (65 km/h; 40 mph)
- Range: 4,800 nmi (8,900 km; 5,500 mi) at 15 knots (28 km/h; 17 mph)
- Complement: 134; 140 (1940)
- Armament: 4 × single 4.7 in (120 mm) guns; 2 × single 2-pdr (40 mm) AA guns; 2 × quadruple 21 in (533 mm) torpedo tubes; 6 × depth charges, 3 chutes

HMS Antelope was a British A-class destroyer, which was completed for the Royal Navy in 1930. Antelope served throughout the Second World War, taking part in the sinking of three enemy submarines and in Operation Torch, the Allied invasion of French North Africa.

== Construction and design ==
Antelope was ordered on 6 March 1928, and was laid down at Hawthorn Leslie on Tyneside on 11 July 1928. The ship was launched on 27 July 1929 and commissioned on 20 March 1930.

She had a main gun armament of four 4.7 in (120 mm) guns on low angle (30 degree) mounts that were only suitable for anti-ship use, and an anti-aircraft armament of two 2-pounder (40 mm) "pom-poms". Eight 21 in (533 mm) torpedo tubes were fitted on two quadruple mounts, with Mark V torpedoes carried. The initial anti-submarine equipment was limited, with no sonar carried and only six depth charges. (Note: Sonar had been fitted by 1939, as Antelope used it when sinking U-41.)

In 1941, one of the 4.7 in guns and the aft bank of torpedo tubes was removed, with a 3 in (76 mm) anti-aircraft gun replacing the torpedo tubes and an enhanced anti-submarine armament, which included 70 depth charges and the ability to drop patterns of 10 charges. Radar was also fitted, and the destroyer's close-in anti-aircraft outfit was supplemented by the addition of Oerlikon 20 mm cannons, of which two were fitted in 1941 followed by four more later on. The 3 inch gun was removed by 1943, when high-frequency direction finding gear was fitted. A second 4.7 in gun was replaced in 1944 by two QF 6-pounder Hotchkiss guns.

== History ==
=== Prewar operations ===
Following completion in 1930, Antelope, along with the rest of the A class and the destroyer leader Codrington joined the 3rd Destroyer Flotilla in the Mediterranean Sea. Antelope took part in patrols off the Spanish coast during the Spanish Civil War, but was damaged in a collision with the destroyers Active and Worcester. After repair Antelope returned to the United Kingdom, where she was based at Portsmouth.

=== Second World War ===
On the outbreak of the Second World War, the destroyer was assigned to the 18th Destroyer Flotilla, Channel Force, based at Portsmouth. For the rest of 1939 and the early months of 1940, Antelope carried out patrol and convoy escort duties in the English Channel and Western Approaches. On 5 February 1940, Antelope was the sole escort of the outward bound convoy OA 84 south of Ireland when the German submarine U-41 attacked the convoy, sinking the freighter Beaverburn and damaging the tanker Ceronia. Antelope retaliated, depth-charging and sinking the U-boat. It was the only U-boat at sea at the time in the area and was the first to be sunk underwater by a single destroyer.

=== Norway ===
In April 1940, Antelope was attached to the Home Fleet for operations as part of the Norwegian Campaign, and when the French cruiser Emile Bertin, flagship of the French forces off Norway, was damaged by German bombers off Namsos, Antelope escorted the French cruiser to Scapa Flow. Antelope then returned to operations off Norway, but on 13 June 1940, Antelope collided with the destroyer Electra off Trondheim, Norway, and had to return to the Tyne for repair which continued until August that year, when she joined the 16th Destroyer Flotilla based at Harwich.

=== Atlantic operations ===
In August 1940, Antelope sailed in convoy to take part in Operation Menace, the attack on Dakar, but after the cruiser Fiji was torpedoed on 1 September 1940, she escorted her back to the Clyde, Scotland. Antelope then joined the 12th Destroyer Flotilla based at Greenock, Scotland.

On 31 October 1940, Antelope was part of the escort convoy OB 237 when it encountered U-31 off northwestern Ireland. Depth charges from Antelope and Achates drove U-31 to the surface, where her crew abandoned ship. Antelope attempted to board U-31, but collided with the unmanned submarine, damaging the destroyer and sinking U-31. Antelope rescued 44 of the U-31's crew, one of whom died on board, and returned them to the Clyde. Lt. Cdr. White was awarded his first bar to his D.S.O. following this sinking.

Antelope joined the 3rd Destroyer Flotilla, with the job of escorting the capital ships of the Home Fleet. In May 1941, Antelope formed part of the destroyer escort for the battlecruiser Hood and battleship Prince of Wales in the chase for the German battleship Bismarck. Separated from the battleships during the battle of the Denmark Strait, Antelope searched for survivors from the sinking of Hood, and later was escort to the aircraft carrier Victorious.

In August 1941, Antelope took part in Operation Gauntlet, an operation that succeeded in destroying the coaling facilities on Spitsbergen, thus denying the coal to Germans. In October, Antelope formed part of the escort for the Arctic Convoy PQ 1 to the Soviet Union.

=== Malta ===
Antelope sailed to Gibraltar in April 1942, escorting the US aircraft carrier USS Wasp during Operation Calendar, an attempt to deliver badly needed Spitfire fighter aircraft to Malta. She acted as an escort during the follow-up Operation Bowery, when carriers Eagle and USS Wasp delivered 61 Spitfires and Operation LB when Eagle delivered a further 17 during May, and Operations Style and Salient in June 1942, when Eagle delivered 55 more Spitfires.

On 11 June, only a day after returning to Gibraltar following Operation Salient, Antelope formed part of the escort for Operation Harpoon, a heavily escorted attempt to resupply Malta. After the cruiser Liverpool was damaged by Italian torpedo bombers, Antelope was dispatched from the convoy to tow Liverpool back to Gibraltar, with the destroyer Westcott as escort. In July, Antelope took part in two further Spitfire resupply runs with Eagle, Operations Pinpoint and Insect. In August 1942 Antelope formed part of the main escort force for Operation Pedestal, another Malta convoy.

After a period stationed off West Africa, Antelope escorted troop convoys taking part in Operation Torch, the Allied invasion of French West Africa. On 30 January 1943, Antelope, together with the Canadian corvette HMCS Port Arthur, sank the Italian submarine Tritone. On 13 March 1943, she was escorting the ocean liner Empress of Canada, when the liner was sunk by the Italian submarine Leonardo da Vinci. In July 1943, Antelope took part in Operation Husky, the invasion of Sicily.

== Disposal ==
In August 1944, Antelope returned to the United Kingdom. By this time she was in poor physical condition, and was paid off into reserve on the Tyne in October to free her crew to help ease a manpower shortage in the Royal Navy. In 1946, she was sold and broken up by Hughes Bolckow shipbreakers.
