= Jack Dowding (footballer) =

Australian rules footballer

Personal information
- Full name: John McCallum Dowding
- Born: 28 January 1881; Bendigo, Victoria
- Died: 11 May 1960 (aged 79); Elwood, Victoria
- Position: Follower/Forward

Playing career^{1}
Years	Club	Games (Goals)
1899–1902	Prahran (VFA)	46 (3)
1903–05	St Kilda	42 (30)
1906–12	Prahran (VFA)	68 (63)
1912–19	Brighton (VFA)	77 (61)
- ^{1} Playing statistics correct to the end of 1919.

John McCallum Dowding (28 January 1881 – 11 May 1960) was an Australian rules footballer who played with St Kilda in the Victorian Football League (VFL). He also played for Prahran and Brighton in the Victorian Football Association (VFA).
