= HMT Celia =

History

United Kingdom
- Name: Celia
- Owner: Royal Navy
- Ordered: 12 December 1939
- Builder: Cochrane & Sons Shipbuilders Ltd. (Selby, U.K.)
- Laid down: 25 May 1940
- Launched: 15 September 1940
- Commissioned: 12 January 1941
- Identification: T 134
- Fate: Sold 1946, sunk 1969

General characteristics
- Class & type: Shakespearian-class naval trawler
- Displacement: 545 long tons (554 t)
- Length: 164 ft (50 m)
- Propulsion: Triple expansion steam engine, 1 shaft
- Speed: 12 knots (22 km/h; 14 mph)
- Crew: 35
- Armament: 1 × 12 pounder 76 mm (3.0 in) gun; 3 × Oerlikon 20 mm AA guns; 30 × depth charges

Celia was a Shakespearian-class naval trawler, launched in late 1940. She served through World War II as a minesweeper and was sold in 1946.

== Description ==
Ships of this class were 165 feet (50 m) long, displaced 545 long tons (554 t) and had a complement of about 35. They were generally armed with a 12 pounder 76 mm (3.0 in) quick-firing low-angle gun and 3 × 20mm Oerlikons on single mountings. A single boiler and triple expansion machinery provided 950 ihp (710 kW) to a single shaft, giving a speed of 12 kn (22 km/h; 14 mph).

== History ==
Celia was ordered by Amos & Smith on 12 December 1939. She was built by Cochrane & Sons, Ltd, Selby Yorkshire. Her keel was laid on 25 May 1940 and she was launched on 15 September.

Celia was commissioned on 12 January 1941. She carried the pennant number T134. She took part in a number of convoys during World War II.

=== 1941 ===
Celia was one of the escorts of Convoy EN 66, which departed from Methil, Fife, on 3 February and arrived at Oban, Argyllshire, on 6 February. She was one of the escorts of Convoy WN 97, which departed from the Clyde on 10 March and arrived at Methil on 14 March. Celia was one of the escorts of Convoy ON 29, which departed from Liverpool, Lancashire on 22 October. She left the convoy on 26 October and the convoy dispersed at 51°57′N 57°00′W on 5 November. She was an escort of Convoy QP 2, which departed from Arkhangelsk, Soviet Union on 3 November and arrived at Kirkwall, Orkney Islands on 17 November. Celia was part of the escort from 11–13 November.

=== 1942–1946 ===
Celia was one of the escorts of Convoy PQ 13, which departed from Loch Ewe on 10 March and arrived at Murmansk, Soviet Union on 31 March. She left the convoy on 23 March at 67°23′N 09°02′W. She was one of the escorts of Convoy UR 23, which departed from Loch Ewe on 8 May and arrived at Reykjavík, Iceland on 11 May.

Celia was sold into merchant service in 1946.
