= Shakespearian-class trawler =

1940 class of British naval trawlers

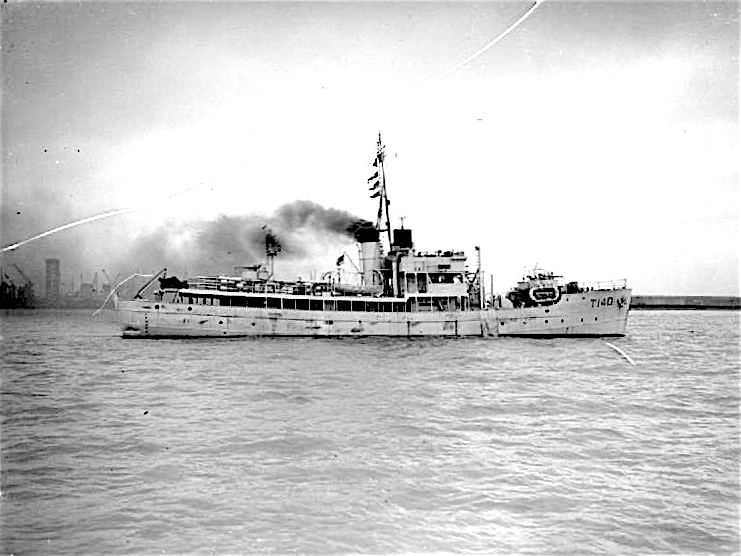
- HMT Coriolanus

Class overview
- Name: Shakespearian class
- Builders: Cochrane & Sons, Selby; Cook, Welton & Gemmell, Beverley; Goole Shipbuilding & Repair Co., Goole; Hall, Russell & Company, Aberdeen; A. & J. Inglis, Glasgow
- Operators: Royal Navy
- Built: 1940–1941
- In commission: 1940–1947
- Completed: 12
- Lost: 3

General characteristics
- Type: Naval trawler
- Displacement: 545 long tons (554 t)
- Length: 164 ft (50 m)
- Propulsion: Reciprocating engine, 1 shaft
- Speed: 12 knots (22 km/h; 14 mph)
- Complement: 40
- Armament: 1 × 12 pounder [76 mm (3.0 in)] gun; 3 × Oerlikon 20 mm AA guns; 30 × depth charges

The Shakespearian-class trawler was a series of anti-submarine naval trawlers of the Royal Navy. Ships in the class had a displacement of 545 long tons (554 t), a top speed of 12 knots (22 km/h; 14 mph) and a crew of 40 men. The trawlers were armed with a QF 12-pounder [76 mm (3.0 in)] gun, three 20 mm Oerlikon anti-aircraft guns and thirty depth charges. The class was nearly identical to the Isles-class trawlers, of which they are usually considered a subclass. Coriolanus, Horatio and Laertes were lost during the war. Othello, was transferred to Italy in 1946 and Rosalind to Kenya, also in 1946. By the end of that year, only Hamlet and Macbeth remained in service with the Royal Navy; both were sold in 1947.

== Ships in class ==
- Built by Cochrane & Sons, Selby, UK
  - Celia – Launched 1940, sold 1946
  - Coriolanus – Launched 1940, war loss 1945
  - Fluellen – Launched 1940, sold 1946
- Built by Cook, Welton & Gemmell, Beverley, UK
  - Hamlet – Launched 24 July 1940, sold 1947
  - Horatio – Launched 1940, war loss 1943
  - Juliet – Launched 1940, sold 1946
  - Laertes – Launched 1940, war loss 1942
- Built by Goole Shipbuilding & Repair Co., Goole, UK
  - Macbeth – Launched 3 October 1940, sold 1947
  - Ophelia – Launched 1940, sold 1946
- Built by Hall, Russell & Company, Ltd., Aberdeen, UK
  - Othello – Launched 1941, transferred to Italy 1946 as DR 310
- Built by A. & J. Inglis, Ltd., Glasgow, UK
  - Romeo – Launched 1941, sold 1946
  - Rosalind – Launched 3 May 1941, transferred to Kenya 1946, joined Royal East African Navy 1952, redeployed to Madagascar 1964

== See also ==
- Operation Dervish
- Trawlers of the Royal Navy
