= HMS Halcyon (J42) =

Minesweeper of the Royal Navy

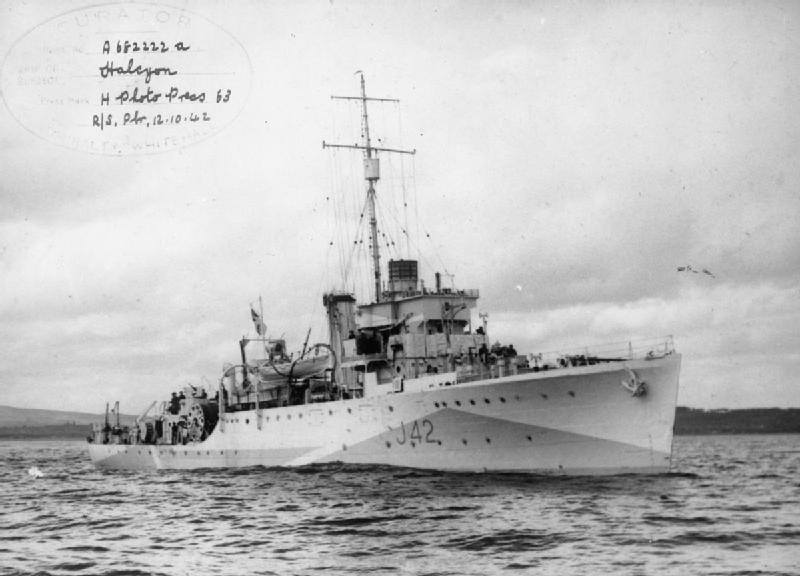

History

United Kingdom
- Name: Halcyon
- Builder: John Brown Shipbuilding & Engineering
- Laid down: 27 March 1933
- Launched: 20 December 1933
- Commissioned: 18 April 1934
- Identification: Pennant number: J42
- Fate: Sold for scrapping on 19 April 1950

General characteristics
- Class & type: Halcyon-class minesweeper
- Displacement: 815 long tons (828 t) standard; 1,370 long tons (1,392 t) full
- Length: 245 ft 9 in (74.90 m) o/a
- Beam: 33 ft 6 in (10.21 m)
- Draught: 8 ft 3 in (2.51 m)
- Installed power: 1,770 ihp (1,320 kW); 2 × Admiralty 3-drum boilers
- Propulsion: 2 shafts; 2 compound-expansion steam engines
- Speed: 16.5 knots (30.6 km/h; 19.0 mph)
- Range: 7,200 nmi (13,300 km; 8,300 mi) at 10 knots (19 km/h; 12 mph)
- Complement: 157
- Armament: 2 × single QF 4-inch (100 mm) guns; 8 × single .303-inch (7.7 mm) machine guns

HMS Halcyon was the lead ship in the Halcyon-class minesweepers built for the Royal Navy in the 1930s. The vessel was launched on 20 December 1933 and was used as a convoy escort and during the landing operations during the invasion of Normandy during World War II. The ship was sold for scrapping in 1950.

== Design and description ==
The Halcyon class designed as a replacement for the preceding Hunt class and varied in size and propulsion. Halcyon displaced 815 long tons (828 t) at standard load and 1,370 long tons (1,390 t) at deep load. The ship had an overall length of 245 feet 9 inches (74.9 m), a beam of 33 feet 6 inches (10.2 m) and a draught of 8 feet 3 inches (2.5 m).

She was powered by two vertical compound-expansion steam engines, each driving one shaft, using steam provided by two Admiralty three-drum boilers. The engines produced a total of 1,770 shaft horsepower (1,320 kW) and gave a maximum speed of 16.5 knots (30.6 km/h; 19.0 mph). Halcyon carried a maximum of 243 long tons (247 t) of fuel oil that gave her a range of 7,200 nautical miles (13,300 km; 8,300 mi) at 10 knots (19 km/h; 12 mph). The ship's complement consisted of 80 officers and ratings.

Halcyon was armed with two QF 4-inch (10.2 cm) guns; the forward gun was in a high-angle mount while the aft gun was in a low-angle mount. She was also equipped with eight .303-inch (7.7 mm) machine guns. Later in her career, the rear 4-inch gun mount was removed as were most of the .303 machine guns, one quadruple mount for Vickers .50 machine guns was added as were up to four single or twin mounts for 20 mm Oerlikon anti-aircraft guns. For escort work, her minesweeping gear could be exchanged for around 40 depth charges.

== Construction and career ==
Halcyon was built by John Brown Shipbuilding & Engineering Company Ltd., at Clydebank, in Scotland. She was laid down on 27 March 1933 and launched on 20 December of the same year. She was commissioned on 18 April 1934.

In February 1939, Halcyon formed part of the reserve fleet based at The Nore. During the Second World War, Halcyon served as the lead ship in the 1st Minesweeper Flotilla and saw service during the Arctic convoys, including Convoy PQ 17 in 1942. She also saw service during Operation Neptune, the naval component of Operation Overlord (D-Day, 1944). Halcyon was sold for scrapping at Milford Haven on 19 April 1950 after 16 years service with the Royal Navy.

== Bibliography ==
- Chesneau, Roger, ed. (1980). Conway's All the World's Fighting Ships 1922–1946. Greenwich, UK: Conway Maritime Press. ISBN 0-85177-146-7.
- Colledge, J. J.; Warlow, Ben (2006) [1969]. Ships of the Royal Navy: The Complete Record of All Fighting Ships of the Royal Navy from the 15th Century to the Present (3rd Rev ed.). London: Chatham Publishing. ISBN 978-1-86176-281-8. OCLC 67375475.
- Lenton, H. T. (1998). British & Empire Warships of the Second World War. Annapolis, Maryland: Naval Institute Press. ISBN 1-55750-048-7.
