= RFA Black Ranger =

1941 Ranger-class fleet support tanker of the Royal Fleet Auxiliary

- Black Ranger

History

United Kingdom
- Name: Black Ranger
- Ordered: 28 August 1939
- Builder: Harland and Wolff, Govan
- Yard number: 1046
- Laid down: 12 October 1939
- Launched: 22 August 1940
- Completed: 27 January 1941
- Commissioned: 27 January 1941
- Decommissioned: April 1973
- Stricken: 1975
- Identification: IMO number: 5045938
- Fate: Sold commercially in July 1973. Scrapped May 1983

General characteristics
- Class & type: Ranger-class fleet support tanker
- Displacement: 6,700 long tons (6,808 t) full load
- Length: 365 ft 10 in (111.51 m)
- Beam: 47 ft (14 m)
- Draught: 20 ft 2 in (6.15 m)
- Propulsion: 1 × 6-cylinder B&W diesel; 3,500 shp (2,600 kW); 1 shaft
- Speed: 13 knots (15 mph; 24 km/h)
- Range: 6,000 nmi (11,000 km) at 13 kn (15 mph; 24 km/h)
- Complement: 40

RFA Black Ranger (A163) was a British diesel-powered Ranger-class fleet support tanker of the Royal Fleet Auxiliary, built by Harland & Wolff at their yard in Govan. On 27 February 1941, shortly after her commissioning, she was involved in a collision with the French destroyer Mistral which sustained minor damage and Black Ranger spent a short period under repair on the Clyde.

Black Ranger later served with the Arctic Convoys. In November 1960 she was involved in a collision with the submarine HMS Thule. She was retired from service in 1973 and put up for sale. Bought by Greek owners, she was renamed Petrola XIV in 1973 and then Petrola 14 in 1976. She was scrapped at Piraeus in May 1983.
