= HMT Macbeth =

History

United Kingdom
- Name: Macbeth
- Namesake: Macbeth
- Builder: Goole Shipbuilding & Repairing Co. Ltd., Goole
- Launched: 3 October 1940
- Commissioned: 14 January 1941
- Fate: Sold, 1947

General characteristics
- Class & type: Shakespearian-class trawler
- Displacement: 545 long tons (554 t)
- Length: 164 ft (50 m)
- Beam: 27 ft 8 in (8.43 m)
- Draught: 11 ft 1 in (3.38 m) (mean)
- Propulsion: 1 × Triple expansion reciprocating engine, 850 ihp (634 kW), 1 shaft
- Speed: 12 knots (22 km/h; 14 mph)
- Complement: 4 officers and 36 men
- Armament: 1 × QF 12-pounder [76 mm (3.0 in)] anti-aircraft gun; 3 × 20 mm Oerlikon AA guns; 30 × depth charges

HMT Macbeth was a Shakespearian-class naval trawler that served with the Royal Navy during the Second World War. She was built by the Goole Shipbuilding & Repairing Co. Ltd., Goole, United Kingdom. Macbeth was launched on 3 October 1940 and commissioned on 14 January 1941.

A steel vessel of 545 long tons (554 t), she measured 164 ft (50 m) in length with a beam of 27 ft 8 in (8.43 m) and a mean draught of 11 ft 1 in (3.38 m). Macbeth was propelled by a reciprocating triple expansion steam engine of 850 indicated horsepower (630 kW), giving her a speed of 12 knots (22 km/h; 14 mph). The crew comprised 4 officers and 36 ratings. Armament consisted of a 12-pounder anti-aircraft (AA) gun, three 20 mm Oerlikon AA guns and 30 depth charges.

Macbeth most notably participated in Operation Dervish in August 1941 as an escort vessel. During the war she was adopted by the Mildenhall Rural District Council, as part of Warship Week. One of the last two Shakespearian-class trawlers remaining in service with the Royal Navy, Macbeth was sold in 1947.

== Publications ==
- Robert Gardiner (ed. dir.), Conway's All the World's Fighting Ships 1922–1946, p. 66. London: Conway Maritime Press, 1980.
