= RFA Aldersdale =

1937 Dale-class replenishment oiler for the Royal Fleet Auxiliary

Coordinates: 75°0′N 45°0′E

- Launching of Aldersdale

History

United Kingdom
- Name: RFA Aldersdale
- Ordered: 1936
- Builder: Cammell Laird and Co., Birkenhead
- Laid down: September 1936
- Launched: 7 July 1937
- Commissioned: 17 September 1937
- Fate: Damaged in air attack on 5 July 1942; Abandoned hulk sunk on 7 July 1942

General characteristics
- Class & type: Dale-class fleet tanker
- Displacement: 17,231 long tons (17,508 t) full load
- Length: 482 ft 6 in (147.07 m)
- Beam: 61 ft 10 in (18.85 m)
- Draught: 27 ft 6.5 in (8.39 m)
- Propulsion: 1 x 4 cyl Doxford diesel engine with a single shaft. 687 nhp
- Speed: 11.5 knots (21.3 km/h)
- Complement: 44

RFA Aldersdale (X34) was a Dale-class fleet tanker of the Royal Fleet Auxiliary.

She was originally one of six ships ordered by the British Tanker Co., which were purchased on the stocks by the Admiralty prior to the Second World War. Aldersdale was part of convoy PQ 17 in 1942, and was damaged by bombs from three Junkers aircraft on 5 July 1942 after Convoy PQ 17 had been ordered to scatter. Aldersdale was abandoned and the drifting wreck was torpedoed and sunk by the German submarine U-457 on 7 July 1942.

== Career ==
Ordered by the British Tanker Company in 1936, Aldersdale was built by Cammell Laird and Co., Birkenhead and launched on 7 July 1937. She was taken over by the Admiralty on 17 September 1937 after completing her sea trials, and on 18 September 1937 sailed from Greenock bound for Abadan on the Persian Gulf on her maiden voyage. Returning to the UK in late 1937, she began to be fitted with defensive armament in January 1938, a process completed in November 1938 after returning from a voyage to Trinidad. After several more voyages between Abadan and the UK, she was in the Middle East at the outbreak of the Second World War. She passed through the Mediterranean in a convoy, and then sailed to Trinidad, and then to Freetown where she arrived in late October 1939. Returning to the UK, via Halifax, Nova Scotia, in December 1939, Aldersdale underwent repairs at Cardiff in January 1940.

Aldersdale sailed to Gibraltar in February 1940, and to Trinidad in March. On her return to British waters, she was sent to Scapa Flow, and then to the Faroe Islands in April. She sustained damage from the cruiser HMS Aurora on her arrival on 24 April 1940, and returned to the UK via Iceland. She was taken in hand for repairs on the River Clyde on 25 July 1940, with work completed on 8 August 1940. She returned to Scapa Flow in September, going on to suffer a number of collision in the later part of the year; with the SS Circe Shell on 4 October 1940, SS Athelempress on 25 November 1940 and the Booth Line's SS Benedict on 22 December 1940. During this time, and into 1941 Aldersdale refuelled allied warships at Scapa Flow. On 19 April 1941 she and RFA Oligarch were allocated to Fleet Attendant Duties in Norwegian waters, with Aldersdale the initial support ship for Halcyon-class minesweepers based in the Kola Inlet as escorts for homeward-bound Arctic convoys. On 12 August 1941 Aldersdale was allocated to Operation Dervish, the first aid convoy to Northern Russia, arriving at Arkhangelsk on 31 August 1941. On 1 September 1941 she touched an uncharted shoal in Sardau Bay, Spitzbergen, before returning to the UK later that month.

Aldersdale returned to Reykjavík in Convoy UR 2, where on 25 December 1941 she suffered damage to her superstructure when she was fouled by the Norwegian tanker SS Svenor, which had broken adrift during a squall. On 15 March 1942 she suffered further damage, this time to her bows by ice. On 31 March 1942 she joined Convoy PQ 14 assembling at Reykjavík, departing for Murmansk on 8 April 1942. On 13 April 1942 the convoy ran into heavy ice and dense fog. Aldersdale was one of 11 ships damaged by ice and forced to return to Hvalfjordur. Aldersdale was under repair on the Clyde between 3 May and 4 June 1942. She then sailed to Iceland to join convoy PQ 17 to Arkhangelsk. On 30 June she took over refuelling duties from RFA Gray Ranger, which had returned to port for repairs after a growler had split her bow open.

== Loss ==
On 4 July 1942 the Admiralty was concerned that heavy German fleet units were putting to sea to attack the convoy. Convoy PQ 17 was ordered to scatter and the ships to make their way independently to Soviet ports. This left the merchants vulnerable to air and submarine attack. On 5 July Aldersdale was bombed by three Junkers aircraft from astern in position 77°00N 22°00E in the Barents Sea. The first two bombers scored near misses that shook the ship, after which they machine gunned the decks and superstructure. The third bomber scored a hit that seemed to lift Aldersdale out of the water. Her engines were wrecked and she began to rapidly take on water. The minesweeper HMS Salamander attempted to take her in tow, but had to cast her off. Aldersdale's crew abandoned ship, all 54 being taken off by Salamander.

The drifting hulk was sighted by the U-boat U-457 two days later on 7 July. Between 11.40 and 13.00 the submarine shelled the hulk with her deck gun, firing 38 high explosive shells and 37 incendiary shells from her 88mm gun and 40 rounds from her 2cm Flak gun. U-457 then fired a torpedo into the abandoned Aldersdale. The wreck broke in two, both halves sinking within 20 minutes.
