= HMS Echo (H23) =

Destroyer of the Royal Navy

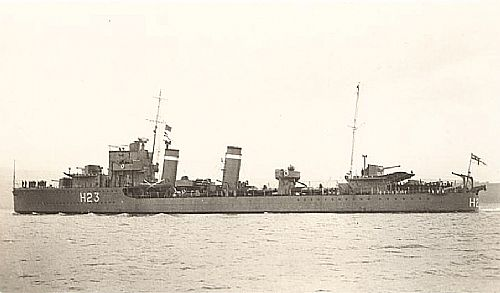
- HMS Echo

History

United Kingdom
- Name: HMS Echo
- Namesake: Echo
- Ordered: 1 November 1932
- Builder: William Denny and Brothers, Dumbarton
- Cost: £247,009
- Laid down: 20 March 1933
- Launched: 16 February 1934
- Completed: 22 October 1934
- Identification: Pennant number: H23
- Motto: Marte et Arte; ("Strength and Skill")
- Honours and awards: Atlantic 1939; Norway 1940; Bismarck Action 1941; Arctic 1941–43; Malta Convoys 1942; Sicily 1943; Salerno 1943; Aegean 1943
- Fate: Transferred to Greece, 5 April 1944
- Badge: On a Field Party per pale Green and Blue, two horns counterchanged Gold and Silver.

Greece
- Name: Navarinon (Greek: Ναυαρίνον)
- Acquired: 5 April 1944
- Fate: Returned to the Royal Navy, 8 March 1956, and sold for scrapping.

General characteristics
- Class & type: E-class destroyer
- Displacement: 1,405 long tons (1,428 t) (standard); 1,940 long tons (1,970 t) (deep load)
- Length: 329 ft (100.3 m) o/a
- Beam: 33 ft 3 in (10.13 m)
- Draught: 12 ft 6 in (3.81 m) (deep)
- Installed power: 36,000 shp (26,800 kW); 3 × Admiralty 3-drum boilers
- Propulsion: 2 × shafts; 2 × Parsons geared steam turbines
- Speed: 35.5 knots (65.7 km/h; 40.9 mph)
- Range: 6,350 nmi (11,760 km; 7,310 mi) at 15 knots (28 km/h; 17 mph)
- Complement: 145
- Sensors & processing systems: ASDIC
- Armament: 4 × single QF 4.7-inch (120 mm) Mk IX guns; 2 × quadruple 0.5-inch (12.7 mm) machine guns; 2 × quadruple 21-inch (533 mm) torpedo tubes; 20 × depth charges, 1 rack and 2 throwers

HMS Echo was an E-class destroyer of the British Royal Navy that saw service in the Atlantic, Arctic and Mediterranean theatres during World War II, before being transferred to the Royal Hellenic Navy in 1944, and renamed Navarinon, until scrapped in 1956.

== Description ==
The E-class ships were slightly improved versions of the preceding D class. They displaced 1,405 long tons (1,428 t) at standard load and 1,940 long tons (1,970 t) at deep load. The ships had an overall length of 329 feet (100.3 m), a beam of 33 feet 3 inches (10.1 m) and a draught of 12 feet 6 inches (3.8 m). They were powered by two Parsons geared steam turbines, each driving one propeller shaft, using steam provided by three Admiralty three-drum boilers. The turbines developed a total of 36,000 shaft horsepower (27,000 kW) and gave a maximum speed of 35.5 knots (65.7 km/h; 40.9 mph). Echo carried a maximum of 470 long tons (480 t) of fuel oil that gave her a range of 6,350 nautical miles (11,760 km; 7,310 mi) at 15 knots (28 km/h; 17 mph). The ships' complement was 145 officers and ratings.

The ships mounted four 4.7-inch (120 mm) Mark IX guns in single mounts. For anti-aircraft (AA) defence, they had two quadruple Mark I mounts for the 0.5 inch Vickers Mark III machine gun. The E class was fitted with two above-water quadruple torpedo tube mounts for 21-inch (533 mm) torpedoes. One depth charge rail and two throwers were fitted; 20 depth charges were originally carried, but this increased to 35 shortly after the war began.

== Service history ==
Echo had a small role in the film Q Planes, released in March 1939.

In January 1940 Echo was deployed with the 12th Flotilla at Scapa Flow for minelayer escort and patrol duties. In May she was deployed to support military operations in Norway. In August she escorted ships of the 1st Minelaying Squadron on several operations, and on the 28th was detached for duty with the Free French expedition to Dakar (Operation Menace). After the operation was abandoned on 25 September, she escorted the damaged battleship Barham to Freetown, where Echo was retained for local convoy defence, not rejoining the Flotilla until the end of October.

On 21 May 1941, Echo and five other destroyers were deployed as the escort to the battlecruiser Hood and battleship Prince of Wales on their way to the Denmark Strait, during the search for the German warships Prinz Eugen and Bismarck. On 25 May, the day after the Battle of the Denmark Strait, Echo escorted the damaged Prince of Wales to Iceland. At the end of July she was deployed in the destroyer screen of Force P—the carriers Furious and Victorious and the cruisers Devonshire and Suffolk—during the raid on Kirkenes and Petsamo. From mid-August she was refitted at the Harland and Wolff shipyard at North Woolwich, rejoining the Flotilla on 4 November.

From 8 December, she and Escapade provided the screen for the cruiser Edinburgh escorting the Russian Convoy PQ 6 to Kola Inlet. On arrival on the 19th, Echo was detached to escort a Russian merchant ship to Murmansk. She was attacked by two German Ju 88 bombers, but spared by the timely arrival of Russian Hurricane fighters and Edinburgh. She then escorted the return Convoy QP 4, arriving back at Scapa Flow on 10 January 1942.

Echo returned to Scapa Flow to provide anti-submarine defence for convoys between the UK and Iceland. On mid-June she began a refit in a Humber shipyard, returning to Scapa Flow on 22 August to join the 8th Destroyer Flotilla. On 2 September she was deployed to support Russian Convoy PQ 18. Further Arctic convoy duty followed, escorting returning Convoy QP 15 in November, then Convoy JW 51A in December 1942, and Convoy JW 52 in January 1943.

In February Echo began a refit at a Humber shipyard, rejoining the 8th Destroyer Flotilla in June, and sailing for Gibraltar on 17 June. In early July the Flotilla sailed to Alexandria to prepare for Operation Husky – the Allied invasion of Sicily. On 13 July 1943, with the help of Ilex, she sank the Italian submarine Nereide south east of the Straits of Messina. On arrival on 16 September she was immediately re-deployed to support operations to reoccupy islands in the Aegean. The next day she and Intrepid attacked the German Unterseebootsjager UJ-2104 off Stampalia, which was beached and abandoned by her crew.

== Greek service ==
In 1944 she was transferred to Greece and renamed Navarinon. In June 1953 she was one of a number of foreign ships to attend Queen Elizabeth II's Coronation Review at Spithead.

== Bibliography ==
- Colledge, J. J.; Warlow, Ben (2006) [1969]. Ships of the Royal Navy: The Complete Record of All Fighting Ships of the Royal Navy from the 15th Century to the Present (3rd Rev ed.). London: Chatham Publishing. ISBN 978-1-86176-281-8. OCLC 67375475.
- English, John (1993). Amazon to Ivanhoe: British Standard Destroyers of the 1930s. Kendal, England: World Ship Society. ISBN 0-905617-64-9.
- Friedman, Norman (2006). British Destroyers & Frigates: The Second World War and After. Annapolis, Maryland: Naval Institute Press. ISBN 1-86176-137-6.
- Lenton, H. T. (1998). British & Empire Warships of the Second World War. Annapolis, Maryland: Naval Institute Press. ISBN 1-55750-048-7.
- Rohwer, Jürgen (2005). Chronology of the War at Sea 1939–1945: The Naval History of World War Two (Third Revised ed.). Annapolis, Maryland: Naval Institute Press. ISBN 1-59114-119-2.
- Whitley, M. J. (1988). Destroyers of World War 2. Annapolis, Maryland: Naval Institute Press. ISBN 0-87021-326-1.
