= Operation EF (1941) =

British WWII air raid in Norway and Finland

- Part of the Continuation War of the Second World War
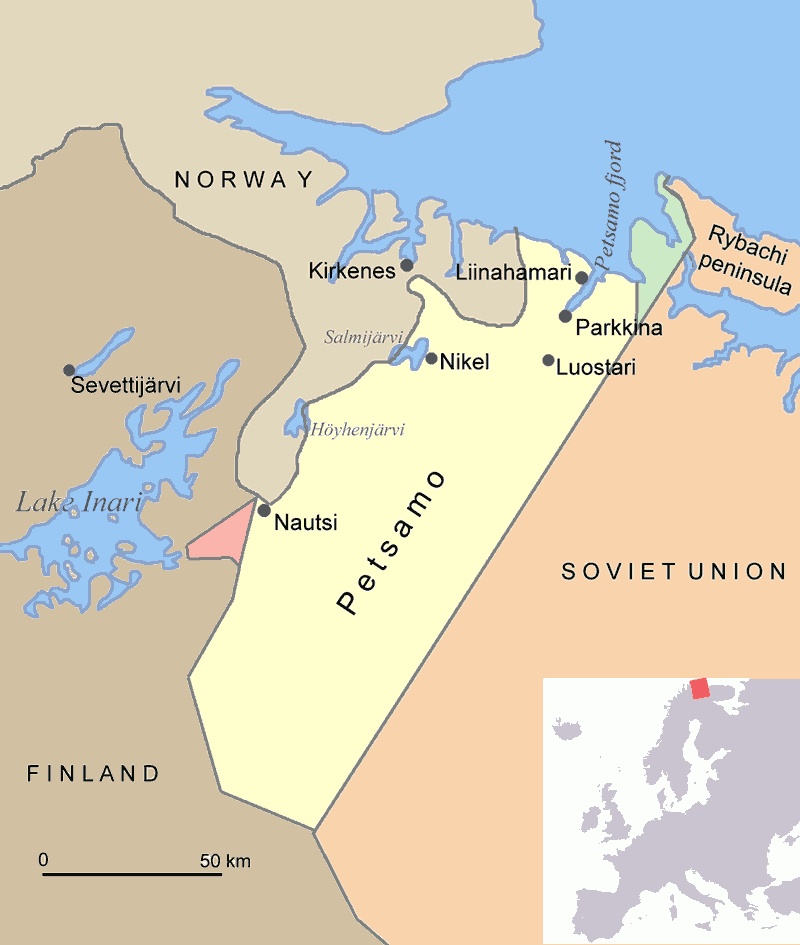
- Diagram showing Kirkenes and Petsamo (Parkkina) (Note: Rybachy Peninsula in green, ceded to the Soviet Union after the 1939–1940 Winter War; area ceded to the USSR in the 1944 Moscow Armistice in yellow; Jäniskoski in red, sold to the USSR in 1947)
Date	30 July 1941
Location	Kirkenes, Norway and Petsamo, Finland: 69°43′37″N 30°02′44″E (Kirkenes); 69°33'38''N; 31°13'40''E (Petsamo)
Result	German victory

Belligerents
United Kingdom	(Nazi Germany) Germany; Finland

Commanders and leaders
John Tovey; Frederic Wake-Walker	Erich Raeder; Rolf Carls; (Finland) Antti Pennanen

Strength
29 Albacores; 9 Swordfish; 15 Fulmar escorts; 4 Hurricanes; 3 Fulmars (Fleet defence); 2 aircraft carriers; 2 cruisers; 6 destroyers	5 merchant vessels; Luftwaffe fighters; Anti-aircraft guns

Casualties and losses
13 killed; 25 captured; 16 aircraft	1 merchant ship sunk; 1 cargo ship damaged; 1 small steamer sunk; 2 aircraft shot down; Ports and oil storage damaged

Operation EF (1941) (the Raid on Kirkenes and Petsamo) took place on 30 July 1941, during the Second World War. After Operation Barbarossa, the German invasion of the Soviet Union, began on 22 June 1941, Fleet Air Arm aircraft flew from the aircraft carriers HMS Victorious and Furious to attack merchant vessels in the northern Norwegian port of Kirkenes and the Finnish port of Liinakhamari in Petsamo.

The War Cabinet and Admiralty pressed Admiral John "Jack" Tovey, commander of the Home Fleet, to attack, despite his reservations that the prospects for success were not commensurate with the risks. The operation was intended to be a surprise but in the far north, the midnight sun at that time of year made it unlikely that the raiding force would go undiscovered.

A German aircraft passed Force P and the carrier aircraft flew over a ship on their flights to Kirkenes and Petsamo, depriving the attackers of surprise. The Kirkenes force was intercepted by thirteen German fighters and nine Junkers Ju 87 Stukas, as the aircraft attacked the few ships to be seen in the harbour, sinking one ship and setting another on fire. Eleven Albacores and two Fulmar fighters were shot down, for a loss of two Luftwaffe aircraft.

The force attacking Petsamo faced less opposition, losing a Fulmar to engine failure on the approach; a Fulmar and an Albacore were shot down during the attack. Minor damage was caused to jetties, a shipyard and oil storage tanks. Tactically, the operation was a costly failure, twelve Albacores and four Fulmars were lost, nine men were killed and 27 taken prisoner for no appreciable result; a Fulmar crew reached Russian territory after two days at sea in a dinghy. The raid had a considerable strategic effect, acting as a catalyst for Hitler's apprehensions of British intervention in the north of Norway.

== Background ==
=== Continuation War ===
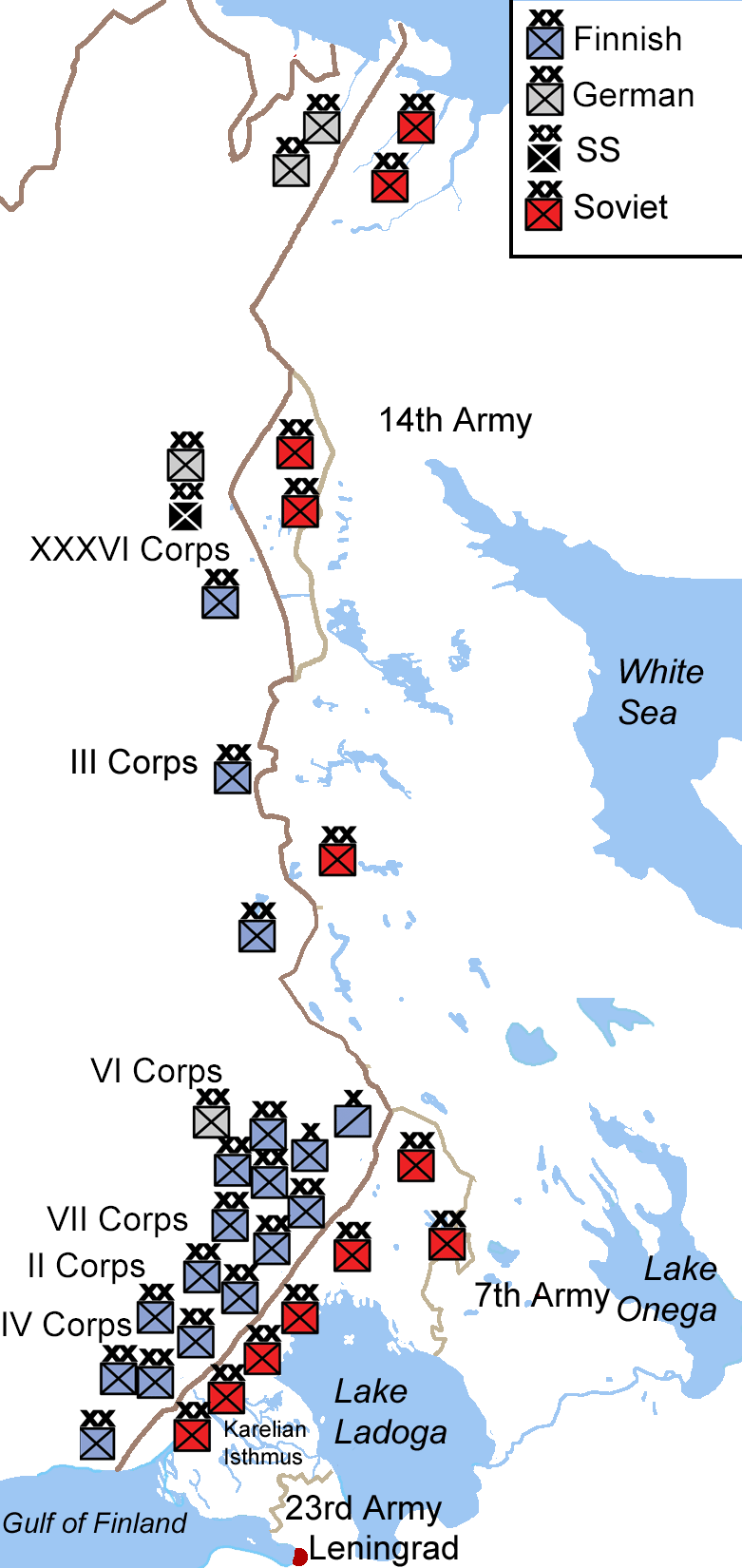
Finnish, German and Soviet dispositions at the start of Operation Barbarossa in June 1941

In early September 1940, Germany and Finland promulgated a transit agreement for members of the Luftwaffe to travel through Finland to Kirkenes in north Norway, despite a similar agreement being in force with Sweden from April 1940. (Note: Finland participated in the war as a co-belligerent in what became known as the Continuation War (25 June 1941 – 19 September 1944). The term was chosen to imply continuity with the Winter War, rather than collusion with the Nazi invasion.) In Directive 21, the instructions from Adolf Hitler for Operation Barbarossa, Murmansk was to be isolated by a military operation to cut the 840 mi (1,350 km) Murmansk–Leningrad railway. The attack was to prevent the Red Army from moving forces from the interior and attacking iron ore mines in northern Sweden and nickel mines around Pechenga, 62 mi (100 km) from Murmansk; the Luftwaffe base at Kirkenes was another 31 mi (50 km) further on. Luftwaffe reconnaissance revealed a considerable garrison at Murmansk and excellent rail marshalling yards and port facilities.

On 3 February 1941, the German Army of Norway received its operation order for the campaign, making the defence of northern Norway its priority. Gebirgskorps Norwegen (Mountain Corps Norway) was to operate in Finland in defence of Pechenga in Operation Rentier until Finland declared war. The Finns were to cover the deployment of German troops in central Finland and to recapture Hanko, then operate to the south-west, either side of Lake Ladoga, when Army Group North (Heeresgruppe Nord) had reached the Dvina River, meeting the German forces at Tikhvin. The German invasion of the Soviet Union began on 22 June 1941 and the German offensive against the Murmansk railway Operation Platinum Fox (29 June – 21 September) began, part of the larger Operation Silver Fox (29 June – 17 November).

=== Soviet–British cooperation ===
The Soviet leadership pressed the British to attack Axis sea traffic from Petsamo and Kirkenes. The governments in London and Washington were aware of the importance of Murmansk as a entrepôt for Allied war material. The Admiralty pressed Admiral John "Jack" Tovey to use the aircraft carriers HMS Furious and Victorious in operations against Axis shipping off northern Norway and Finland. Tovey stressed the risk in operating carriers so close to Luftwaffe airfields, in conditions of the midnight sun, which in northern Norway lasts from about 14 May to 29 July; Tovey suggested offensive operations further south, stressing the vulnerability of Swordfish and Albacore bombers, even with Fulmar fighter escorts. The Prime Minister, Winston Churchill, insisted that the new alliance between Britain and the Soviet Union needed practical expression in the far north. The Admiralty over-ruled Tovey and ordered him to conduct Operation EF with ships of the Home Fleet, no later than 21 July 1941.

== Prelude ==
=== German naval operations ===
The German submarines U-81 and U-652 began operations off the Kola Inlet in July and five destroyers of the 6th Destroyer Flotilla transferred to Kirkenes to join the training ship Bremse and other vessels. Before the German invasion of the Soviet Union, the British Home Fleet was mainly concerned with the exits of the North Sea from Norway to Greenland. After 22 June 1941, the emphasis of the fleet began to shift northwards, from Norway to the Arctic.

=== Force P ===
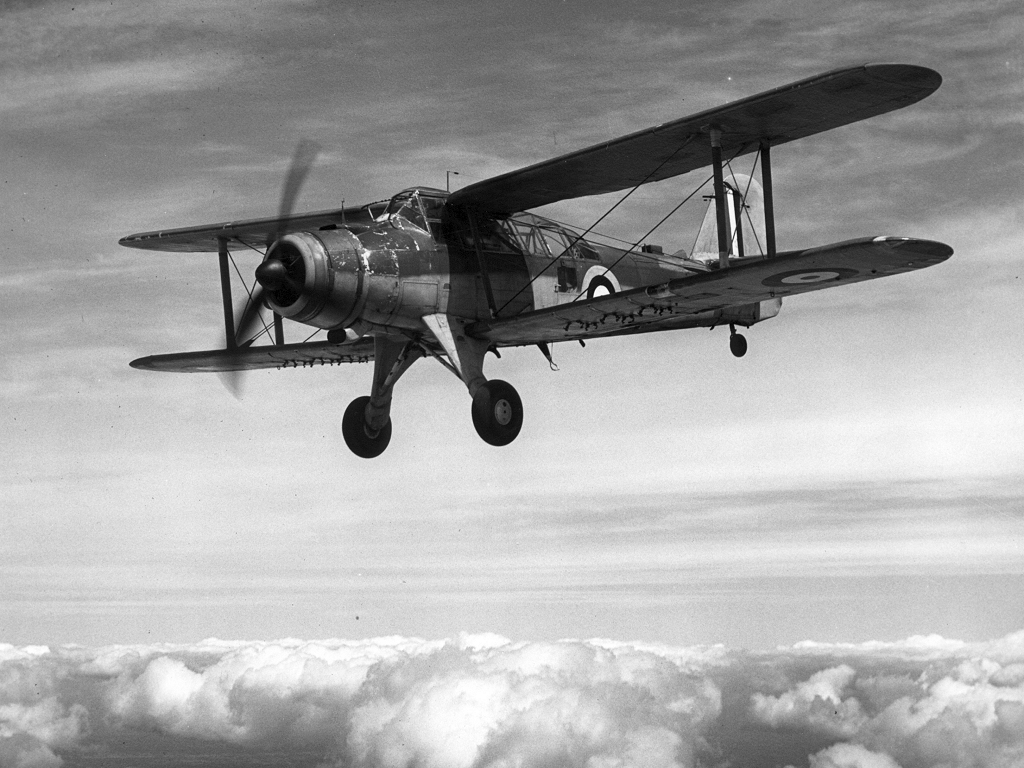
Fairey Albacore

Neither aircraft carrier had been able adequately to train in naval air operations. Furious had nine Fulmar fighters of 800 Naval Air Squadron (800 NAS) and four Sea Hurricanes of A Flight, 880 NAS, nine Swordfish of 812 NAS and nine Albacores of 817 NAS were embarked but 817 NAS had only been commissioned in March. Many of the pilots of 817 NAS were novices who had not had the opportunity to qualify in deck landings on HMS Argus or to practice torpedo-bombing, because Argus had been busy ferrying aircraft to west Africa. Victorious, with twelve Albacores in 827 NAS and nine in 828 NAS and twelve Fulmars of 809 NAS had not been able to work up since commissioning just before the hunt for Bismarck. The commander of Force P, Rear-Admiral Frederic Wake-Walker in HMS Devonshire sailed from Scapa Flow on 23 July.

The destroyer Achates struck a British mine off Iceland on 25 July, losing its bow and was towed home by Anthony, the two being replaced by HMS Inglefield and Icarus. Force P was divided into the First Division, Victorious, the cruiser Devonshire, the destroyers HMS Escapade, Inglefield and Icarus and the Second Division with Furious, the cruiser HMS Suffolk and the destroyers HMS Intrepid, Echo and Eclipse. Force P reached Seyðisfjörður (Seidisfjord) in Iceland on 25 July, refuelled and sailed the following day for Norway. During the night of 26/27 July Force P made course for its rendezvous, about 80 nmi (150 km; 92 mi) north-east of Kirkenes and arrived three days later, having sailed through fog and low cloud, which curtailed flying but helped to conceal its presence. At 1:30 p.m. on 30 July, once within range of land-based aircraft and dependent on their fighter cover and anti-aircraft guns, the cloudy weather gave way to clear skies.

=== Plan ===
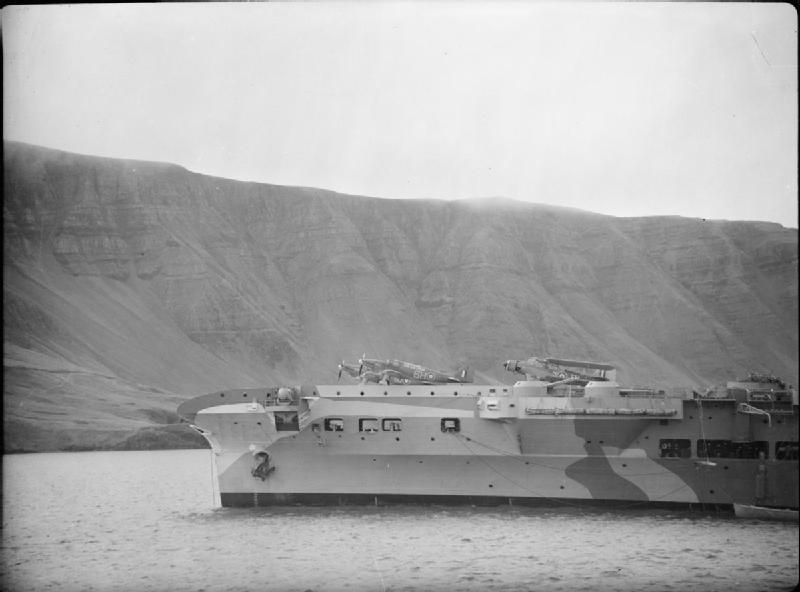
The forward flight deck of HMS Victorious with Fulmars and Albacores on board during preparations for Norwegian operations

Little opposition from the Luftwaffe was expected, despite the intensity of German ground operations in the direction of Murmansk and the Fulmars were thought to be adequate air cover during the attack. The aircrew on Victorious were briefed to attack Kirkenes; twelve Albacores of 827 NAS and eight from 828 NAS were armed with torpedoes and escorted by nine Fulmars of 809 NAS. The crews of 827 NAS were to attack ships around the Tower of Kirkenes and Langfjord and those from 828 NAS were to attack Holmengråfjorden and an anchorage east of Renoy Island. Should the harbours be empty, the force from Victorious would attack an iron ore plant. Six Swordfish of 812 NAS from Furious were armed with torpedoes and three with two 250 lb (110 kg) bombs and eight 25 lb (11 kg) incendiary bombs each.

Six Albacores of 817 NAS carried torpedoes and three bombers had the same bomb-load as the Swordfish bombers, with six Fulmar escorts of 800 NAS carrying four 20 lb (9.1 kg) HE bombs for targets of opportunity. If no shipping was found in Petsamo harbour, the aircraft were to attack oil storage tanks. A Heinkel He 111 bomber flew into sight and was detected sending a wireless massage, more than an hour before the raid was to begin. Wake-Walker considered cancelling the operation, since the Germans had an hours' warning but decided to continue and take-offs began at 2:00 p.m. Victorious dispatched twenty bombers and torpedo-bombers as Furious sent nine bombers and four Sea Hurricanes (to guard the aircraft carriers) aloft. At 2:18 p.m. twelve Fulmars took off from Victorious, nine to escort the bombers and three to patrol Force P, soon followed by nine bombers and six Fulmars from Furious.

== Attack ==
=== Kirkenes ===
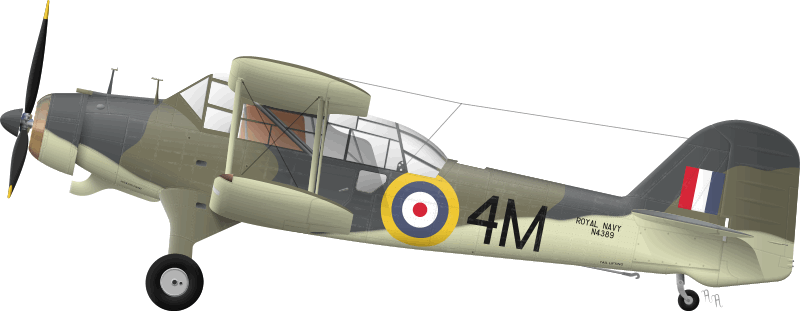
Markings of Albacore N4389, 827 Naval Air Squadron, HMS Victorious, shot down in Operation EF, July 1941. Salvaged, rebuilt and on display in the Fleet Air Arm Museum

The aircraft from Victorious flew towards the sun at low altitude to evade radar but passed over a German hospital ship, losing any remaining hope of surprise. The aircraft climbed to 3,000 ft (910 m) over the coastal mountains, being engaged by intense anti-aircraft fire as they did. The crews fired the Luftwaffe colours-of-the-day as a ruse but this failed and the ground fire increased and then suddenly stopped. Thirteen Messerschmitt Bf 109 (Bf 109) of Jagdgeschwader 77 and Messerschmitt Bf 110 (Bf 110) fighters of Zerstörergeschwader 76 appeared, escorting nine Junkers Ju 87 (Ju 87 Stuka) dive-bombers returning from a raid.

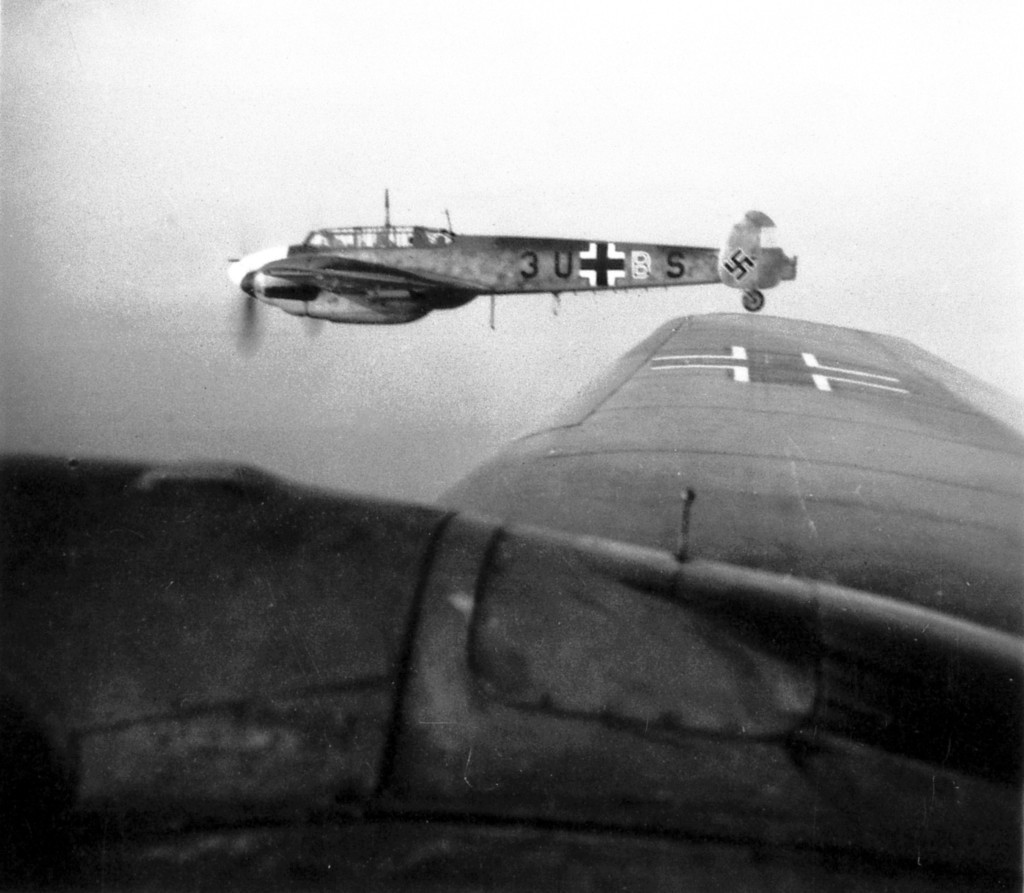
Photograph of Messerschmitt Bf 110 fighters

The shipping in the harbour turned out to be a Kriegsmarine training ship and two medium-sized freighters, which were attacked, bomb hits on the two merchantmen being claimed after the raid. The Fulmar escorts tried to divert the German fighters from the Albacores and shot down a Bf 110 for the loss of two Fulmars. The Albacores released their torpedoes quickly to get away from anti-aircraft fire, sinking one 2,000 long tons (2,000 t) vessel, setting another on fire and causing minor damage ashore. The Albacores tried to escape from the German fighters, having the advantage of superior manoeuvrability but eleven were shot down by anti-aircraft fire and Luftwaffe fighters. An 827 NAS pilot claimed a Ju 87 which flew in front of his Albacore, a claim which was borne out later by German records. (Note: Authors differ on the numbers of aircraft claimed. Sturtivant wrote that one Bf 109 and two Bf 110s were shot down; the Fleet Air Arm Archive website has two Bf 109s and one Bf 110. Tovey provides the official numbers on page 3,172 of one Bf 109, two Bf 110s and one Ju 87.)

=== Petsamo ===
Furious sent nine Swordfish of 812 NAS and nine Albacores of 817 NAS to raid Petsamo. A Fulmar was lost due to engine failure prior to the attack and the remainder found a harbour almost deserted except for anti-aircraft guns. The aircraft dropped their torpedoes against a small ship and the jetties but these were wooden and easy to replace. The 800 NAS Fulmar bombers attacked a shipyard and the oil storage tanks but had little effect. The attackers were intercepted by Bf 109 fighters; an Albacore and a Fulmar were shot down.

On 31 July, the serviceable aircraft on Furious were transferred to Victorious for Furious to return due to fuel shortage. Three Fulmars took off from Victorious on 4 August for an attack on Tromsø in which one Fulmar was lost. The force then turned for home.

== Aftermath ==
=== Analysis ===
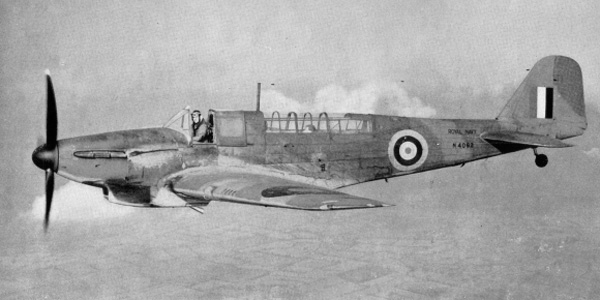
Fairey Fulmar Mk I

By the early evening, the surviving aircraft had landed on their carriers and Force P had begun the voyage back to Scapa Flow. On 31 July a Dornier Do 18 began to shadow the force until two of the Sea Hurricanes shot it down. The commander of Furious called the raid

...a bitter blow to the attacking force, who were tee-ed up for really big things, to find they had come over two thousand miles to attack a place without a single real military objective.

— Captain Arthur Talbot

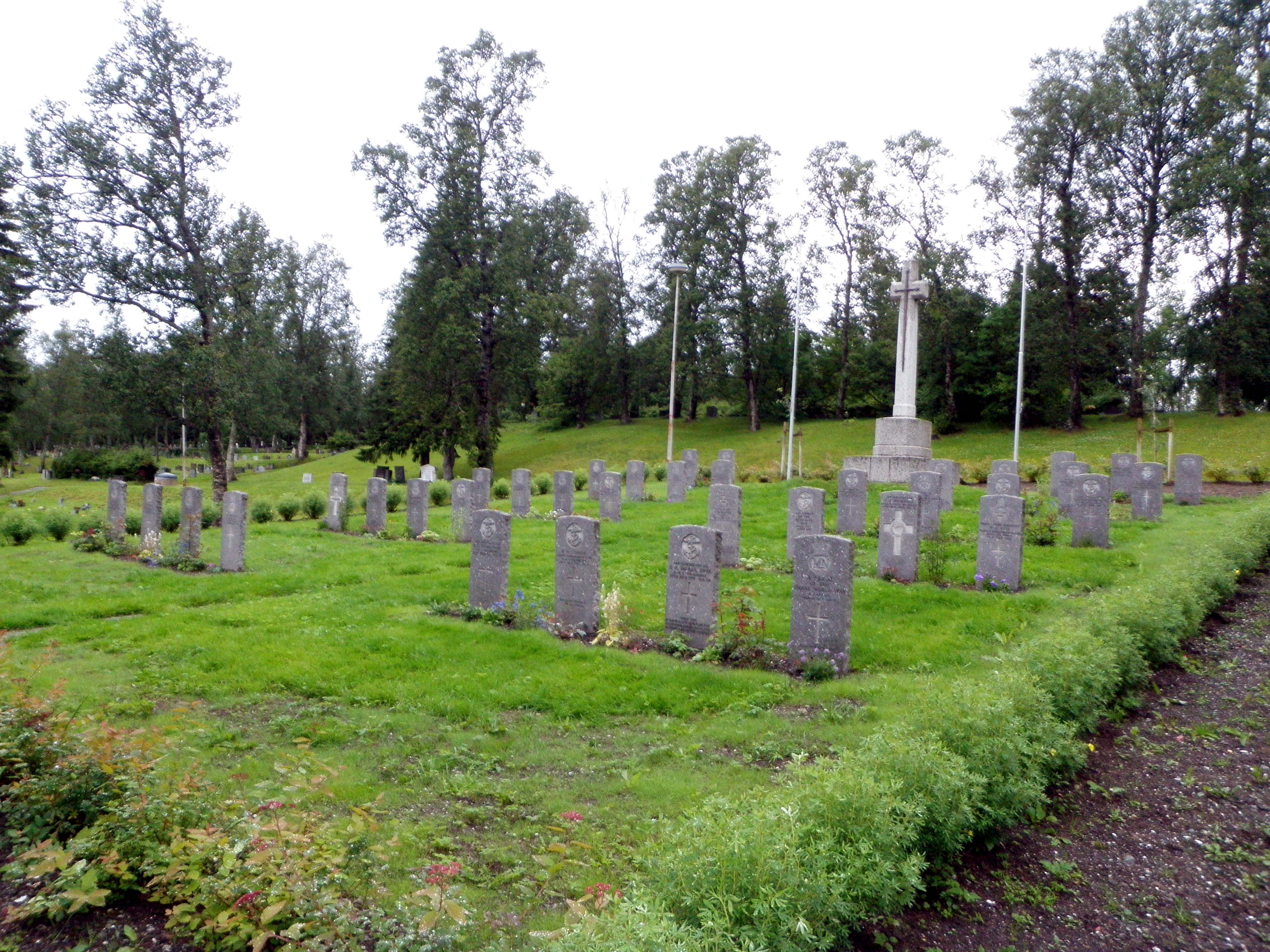
Three of the British airmen killed during the raid were buried in the Commonwealth War Graves section of Tromsø's main cemetery.

In 2005, Ron Mackay called the raid an "unqualified disaster"; twelve Albacores and four Fulmars had been lost with 36 casualties. The vulnerability of the Albacore and Fulmar aircraft against modern fighters had been demonstrated but the Swordfish of 812 NAS had escaped loss, perhaps because the raid on Petsamo had encountered less opposition than that on Kirkenes. Mackay wrote that it would have been better to send the Sea Hurricanes to cover the raid, despite hindsight suggesting that four Sea Hurricanes were hardly adequate to defend the ships.

In 2024 Andrew Boyd wrote that EF was considered an expensive political gesture of no great consequence but Grand Admiral Erich Raeder the head of the Kriegsmarine and Hitler were far more concerned about British operations in the Arctic, thinking them to be a threat to German coastal traffic. The German 6th Destroyer Flotilla could easily have been caught in Kirkenes during the British attack. Raeder told Hitler on 17 September that troopships were unable to sail east of the North Cape and merchant ships only at grave risk. As winter reduced flying, the British threat would increase. Hitler's concern about British meddling on the northern European flank worsened and towards the end of 1941 was "bordering on paranoia". Boyd wrote that by the end of 1941, "for Hitler the region was 'of decisive importance for the outcome of the war' and Norway 'the zone of destiny'".

=== Casualties ===
In 2005, Ron Mackay wrote that nine aircrew of the Fleet Air Arm were killed, 27 taken prisoner and two men were rescued by Soviet forces after two days at sea in a dinghy. In 2022, David Hobbs wrote that the dinghy escape story was untrue. In 2012, Ben Jones wrote that 16 aircraft were lost in the raids and in 2014, Martyn Chorlton wrote that Victorious lost 13 Albacores and their crews in the raid.

=== Operation EG ===
Map of Lofoten and Vesteraalen

The Albacore squadrons were transferred from Victorious during August and replaced by 817 and 832 NAS. Victorious became part of Force M, operating towards Bear Island and the approaches to the White Sea, during Operation Dervish. On 3 September, an attack on ships sailing from Tromsø to Kirkenes and oil tanks at Hammerfest about 140 nmi (260 km; 160 mi) north-east of Tromsø began but when cloud cover dissipated, the formation leaders turned back according to their instructions, because of the risk of interception by the Luftwaffe fighters based at Banak. The attempt gave away the presence of a British force but despite the loss of surprise, Force M refuelled at Spitzbergen on 7 September.

The Force remained off the Norwegian coast and on 12 September an attack was made on Vestfjorden and Glomfjord about 30 nmi (56 km; 35 mi) further south. Two Albacore formations, one with bombs and the other with torpedoes, managed to sink a merchant ship in Vestfjorden, a small vessel was sunk at Bodø, an aluminium factory at Glomfjord was damaged and a D/F station was destroyed. The lack of fighter opposition led to a second raid being planned but this was cancelled when the force was spotted by a He 111.

Victorious was carrying two Grumman Martlet fighters borrowed from Argus, which caught up with the German bomber and shot it down. Two Blohm & Voss BV 138 flying boats began to shadow the force and the FAA Fulmars found it impossible to penetrate their armour with .303 Browning machine-gun fire. A raid on 9 October was hampered by heavy seas and five of the 13 Albacores on deck were damaged; three Albacores managed to find and attack a freighter. During the afternoon, eight composite crews from 817 and 832 NAS attacked two merchantmen which were escorted by flak ships and achieved several bomb hits, one ship crew taking to their lifeboats.

== British order of battle ==
=== Force P ===
==== First Division ====
First Division
Name	Flag	Type	Notes
HMS Victorious	Royal Navy	Illustrious-class aircraft carrier	809 Naval Air Squadron, 827 NAS, 828 NAS
HMS Devonshire	Royal Navy	County-class cruiser	Flagship Rear-Admiral Frederic Wake-Walker
HMS Achates	Royal Navy	A-class destroyer	Struck British mine 25 July, towed home by Anthony
HMS Anthony	Royal Navy	A-class destroyer	Towed Achates home after it was damaged by a mine.
HMS Escapade	Royal Navy	E-class destroyer	Replaced Achates
HMS Icarus	Royal Navy	I-class destroyer	Replaced Anthony

=== HMS Adventure ===
Minelayer
Name	Flag	Type	Notes
HMS Adventure	Royal Navy	Adventure-class cruiser	Escorted towards Russia by Force P until 30 July

==== Second Division ====
Second Division
Name	Flag	Type	Notes
HMS Furious	Royal Navy	Courageous-class aircraft carrier	800 Naval Air Squadron, 812 NAS, 817 NAS, A Flight 880 NAS
HMS Suffolk	Royal Navy	County-class cruiser	
HMS Echo	Royal Navy	E-class destroyer	
HMS Eclipse	Royal Navy	E-class destroyer	
HMS Intrepid	Royal Navy	I-class destroyer	
