= Soviet destroyer Gromky =

Destroyer of the Soviet Navy

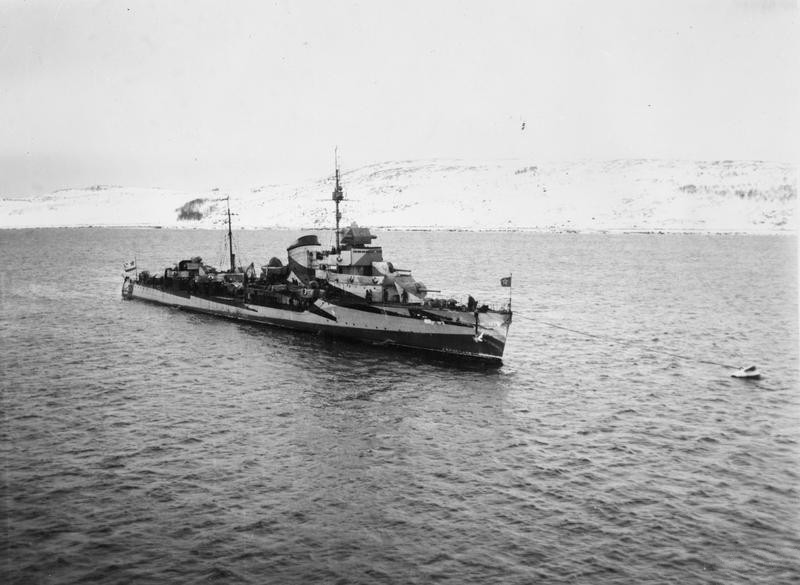
- Aerial view of sister ship Razumny, March 1944

History

Soviet Union
- Name: Gromky (Громкий (Loud))
- Ordered: 2nd Five-Year Plan
- Builder: Shipyard No. 190 (Zhdanov), Leningrad
- Laid down: 29 April 1936
- Launched: 6 December 1937
- Completed: 31 December 1938
- Renamed: OS-3, 27 December 1956
- Reclassified: As a test ship, 27 December 1956
- Stricken: 17 February 1956
- Honors and awards: Order of the Red Banner, 6 March 1945
- Fate: Sunk after a nuclear test, 10 October 1957

General characteristics (Gnevny as completed, 1938)
- Class & type: Gnevny-class destroyer
- Displacement: 1,612 t (1,587 long tons) (standard)
- Length: 112.8 m (370 ft 1 in) (o/a)
- Beam: 10.2 m (33 ft 6 in)
- Draft: 4.8 m (15 ft 9 in)
- Installed power: 3 water-tube boilers; 48,000 shp (36,000 kW)
- Propulsion: 2 shafts; 2 geared steam turbines
- Speed: 38 knots (70 km/h; 44 mph)
- Range: 2,720 nmi (5,040 km; 3,130 mi) at 19 knots (35 km/h; 22 mph)
- Complement: 197 (236 wartime)
- Sensors & processing systems: Mars hydrophone
- Armament: 4 × single 130 mm (5.1 in) guns; 2 × single 76.2 mm (3 in) AA guns; 2 × single 45 mm (1.8 in) AA guns; 2 × single 12.7 mm (0.50 in) AA machineguns; 2 × triple 533 mm (21 in) torpedo tubes; 60–96 mines; 2 × depth charge racks, 25 depth charges

Gromky (Russian: Громкий, lit. 'Loud') was one of 29 Gnevny-class destroyers (officially known as Project 7) built for the Soviet Navy during the late 1930s. Completed in 1938, the ship was initially assigned to the Baltic Fleet before being transferred to the Northern Fleet in mid-1939 where she played a minor role in the 1939–1940 Winter War against Finland.

After the start of the German invasion of the Soviet Union (Operation Barbarossa) in June 1941, Gromky covered an amphibious landing along the Arctic coast and laid several minefields. The ship spent most of her service escorting the Arctic Convoys, run by the British to provide weapons and supplies to the Soviets, or providing naval gunfire support to Soviet troops along the Arctic coast. She ran out of fuel during one escort mission in early 1942 and had to be rescued. A few months later a storm nearly ripped her bow off. Later that year Gromky helped to rescue crewmen from one of her sister ships after it had broken in half during heavy weather in 1942. She also was badly damaged by the storm and spent several months under repair. The ship resumed her convoy escort duties until October 1944 when she provided fire support during the Petsamo–Kirkenes Offensive. Gromky was mostly inactive after that until the end of the war. After a lengthy modernization that lasted from 1948 to 1954, she was reclassified as a test ship in 1956 and was expended in a nuclear test the following year.

== Design and description ==
Having decided on the specifications of the large 40-knot (74 km/h; 46 mph) Leningrad-class destroyer leaders, the Soviet Navy sought Italian assistance in designing smaller and cheaper destroyers. They licensed the plans for the Folgore class and, in modifying it for their purposes, overloaded a design that was already somewhat marginally stable.

The Gnevnys had an overall length of 112.8 meters (370 ft 1 in), a beam of 10.2 meters (33 ft 6 in), and a draft of 4.8 meters (15 ft 9 in) at deep load. The ships were significantly overweight, almost 200 metric tons (197 long tons) heavier than designed, displacing 1,612 metric tons (1,587 long tons) at standard load and 2,039 metric tons (2,007 long tons) at deep load. Their crew numbered 197 officers and sailors in peacetime and 236 in wartime. The ships had a pair of geared steam turbines, each driving one propeller, rated to produce 48,000 shaft horsepower (36,000 kW) using steam from three water-tube boilers which was intended to give them a maximum speed of 37 knots (69 km/h; 43 mph). The designers had been conservative in rating the turbines and many, but not all, of the ships handily exceeded their designed speed during their sea trials. Others fell considerably short of it, although specific figures for most individual ships have not survived. Variations in fuel oil capacity meant that the range of the Gnevnys varied between 1,670 to 3,145 nautical miles (3,093 to 5,825 km; 1,922 to 3,619 mi) at 19 knots (35 km/h; 22 mph).

As built, the Gnevny-class ships mounted four 130-millimeter (5.1 in) B-13 guns in two pairs of superfiring single mounts fore and aft of the superstructure. Anti-aircraft defense was provided by a pair of 76.2-millimeter (3 in) 34-K AA guns in single mounts and a pair of 45-millimeter (1.8 in) 21-K AA guns as well as two 12.7-millimeter (0.50 in) DK or DShK machine guns. They carried six 533 mm (21.0 in) torpedo tubes in two rotating triple mounts; each tube was provided with a reload. The ships could also carry a maximum of either 60 or 95 mines and 25 depth charges. They were fitted with a set of Mars hydrophones for anti-submarine work, although they were useless at speeds over 3 knots (5.6 km/h; 3.5 mph). The ships were equipped with two K-1 paravanes intended to destroy mines and a pair of depth-charge throwers.

=== Modifications ===
At some point between 1942 and 1945, Gromky had her 21-K guns replaced by three 37-millimeter (1.5 in) 70-K AA guns in single mounts and three twin-gun mounts for Lend-Lease, water-cooled 12.7 mm Colt-Browning machine guns and two single mounts for improved DShK machine guns. By the end of the war, she had received a British ASDIC system and a Soviet Gyuys-1 early-warning radar. After the war, all of her AA guns were replaced by eight water-cooled V-11M versions of the 70-K gun in twin mounts and her electronics were replaced by Soviet systems.

== Construction and service ==
Built in Leningrad's Shipyard No. 190 (Zhdanov) as yard number 503, Gromky was laid down on 29 April 1936, launched on 6 December 1937, and was completed on 31 December 1938. The ship was assigned to the Baltic Fleet before she was transferred to the Northern Fleet via the White Sea Canal in early 1939. During the Winter War, her only action was to help to cover the laying of a minefield off Petsamo with her sister ship Grozny on 2–3 January 1940.

When Operation Barbarossa, the German invasion of the Soviet Union, began on 22 June 1941, the ship was based in Polyarny. Together with her sisters Stremitelny and Gremyashchy, Gromky covered the landing of troops on the western side of the mouth of the Zapadnaya Litsa River on 14 July during Operation Platinum Fox, the German attempt to capture Murmansk. On 10–15 September, Gromky and her sisters in the 1st Destroyer Division (Gremyashchy, Sokrushitelny and Grozny) laid a pair of minefields off the Rybachy Peninsula using British mines delivered by the minelayer HMS Adventure. From 20 to 29 October, Gromky bombarded German positions near the Zapadnaya Litsa River with a total of 1,251 shells from her 130 mm guns. On 14 November, Gromky and Gremyashchy rendezvoused with a British light cruiser and a pair of destroyers to bombarded German-occupied Vardø, Norway, and then met up with Convoy PQ 3 to escort it to Arkhangelsk. Gromky shelled German troops near the Zapadnaya Litsa River again on 19 November with 103 rounds. Gromky, Gremyashchy and the same three British ships made an unsuccessful search for German ships off the Norwegian coast and then bombarded Vardø again on 24–25 November, during which Gromky expended 112 shells from her main guns. She returned to the Litsa on 30 December and fired 100 rounds at German positions, before starting a refit on 2 January 1942 that lasted until 2 February.

After refitting in January 1942, Grozny, together with Gromky, escorted the light cruiser HMS Nigeria to rendezvous with Convoy PQ 11 on 20 February, but the destroyers were forced to return to port because of a strong storm. It frustrated a subsequent attempts two days later, but they were finally able to meet the convoy that evening. Gromky helped to escort Convoy QP 8 on 1–4 March, but ran out of fuel the following day as she was headed for port in heavy weather that washed four crewmen overboard. Grozny was the first ship to reach the destroyer which was successfully refueled and subsequently reached port. On 30 March, Gromky escorted the badly damaged light cruiser HMS Trinidad and the destroyer HMS Eclipse into Kola Bay. At the beginning of May, the ship provided naval gunfire support to Soviet troops, firing a total of 446 shells on 1 and 3 May. While returning from one such mission during a Force 8 storm on 6 May, cracks developed on the deck and sides of her bow and the ship was only able to make a speed of 4 knots (7.4 km/h; 4.6 mph) in the heavy weather. Gromky reached struggled to reach Murmansk where an inspection revealed that only the ship's keel held her bow in place. After temporary repairs were completed, she arrived in Molotovsk on 20 June to begin permanent repairs.

After the repairs were completed on 9 October and working up, Gromky put to sea on 22 November and rescued some of Sokrushitelny's crew after that ship had broken in half and sunk during a bad storm; Gromky's hull was damaged by the search and she returned to port two days later. Her repairs began on 29 November and lasted until 25 January 1943. In early February, the ship escorted convoys between Murmansk and the White Sea. On 26 February, she rendezvoused with Convoy JW 53 and escorted the bulk of it into Kola Bay. Together with the destroyer leader Baku and Grozny, Gromky unsuccessfully attempted to intercept German supply ships along the coast of Norway on 27–28 and 30–31 March. She helped to escort five Allied cargo ships from Murmansk to Arkhangelsk on 17–18 May before beginning repairs on 18 June that lasted until 10 September. Together with Gremyashchy and the minesweeper HMS Britomart, Gromky escorted a pair of Allied cargo ships from Murmansk to Arkhangelsk on 29 September–2 October. While escorting a Soviet convoy on 12 October, the transport SS Maria Raskova's steering gear failed in a storm and Gremyashchy took her in tow. She was still uncontrollable and Gromky passed a cable from her bow to Maria Raskova's stern to steady her. Two days later, the cable snapped, but a new one was rigged shortly afterwards. That night the new cable snapped, but the remaining piece of the cable hung down off the stern and dragged along the seafloor which steadied the ship so another attempt to pass a cable was not made. On 22 October, Gromky helped to escort Soviet icebreakers from the Kara Strait to the White Sea. The following month she was one of the escorts for Convoys RA 54, JW 54A and RA 55 before beginning a refit on 29 November. After it was completed on 12 December. Gromky escorted Convoy JW 55A on 21–22 December.

Another attempt by Gromky and three other destroyers to intercept German supply ships off the Norwegian coast on 20–22 January 1944 was unsuccessful. She rendezvoused with Convoy JW 56A on 26 January and helped to escort it into Kola Bay. Gromky was one of the escorts for ships from Convoy JW 56A 27–29 January and then she escorted Convoy RA 56 outbound from Murmansk on 3–4 March. While escorting a convoy from Murmansk to Archangelsk on 8 March, Gromky claimed to have damaged a German submarine, although that engagement cannot be confirmed from German records. The ship then escorted a Soviet convoy in the opposite direction on 7 April so that the ships could join Convoy RA 58. She then spent the next several months escorting convoys in the White and Barents Seas. Gromky escorted Convoy JW 59 on 24–26 August and then resumed escort duties for local convoys. On 9–11 October the ship provided gunfire support to Soviet troops during the Petsamo–Kirkenes Offensive, firing 715 rounds during those three days. She was refitted from the end of October to the end of the year and was inactive for the rest of the war. Gromky was awarded the Order of the Red Banner on 6 March.

After the war, the ship received a lengthy modernization that last from 27 March 1948 to 31 December 1954. Gromky was reclassified as test ship OS-3 on 27 December 1956 and was used as a target during a nuclear test on 7 September 1957 on Novaya Zemlya. The ship sank there on 10 October.

== Sources ==
- Berezhnoy, Sergey (2002). Крейсера и миноносцы. Справочник [Guide to Cruisers and Destroyers] (in Russian). Moscow: Voenizdat. ISBN 5-203-01780-8.
- Budzbon, Przemysaw (1980). "Soviet Union". In Chesneau, Roger (ed.). Conway's All the World's Fighting Ships 1922–1946. Greenwich, UK: Conway Maritime Press. pp. 318–346. ISBN 0-85177-146-7.
- Hill, Alexander (2018). Soviet Destroyers of World War II. New Vanguard. Vol. 256. Oxford, UK: Osprey Publishing. ISBN 978-1-4728-2256-7.
- Platonov, Andrey V. (2002). Энциклопедия советских надводных кораблей 1941–1945 [Encyclopedia of Soviet Surface Ships 1941–1945] (in Russian). Saint Petersburg: Poligon. ISBN 5-89173-178-9.
- Rohwer, Jürgen (2005). Chronology of the War at Sea 1939–1945: The Naval History of World War Two (Third Revised ed.). Annapolis, Maryland: Naval Institute Press. ISBN 1-59114-119-2.
- Rohwer, Jürgen & Monakov, Mikhail S. (2001). Stalin's Ocean-Going Fleet. London: Frank Cass. ISBN 0-7146-4895-7.
- Yakubov, Vladimir & Worth, Richard (2008). "The Soviet Project 7/7U Destroyers". In Jordan, John & Dent, Stephen (eds.). Warship 2008. London: Conway. pp. 99–114. ISBN 978-1-84486-062-3.
