= Convoy PQ 6 =

- Part of Arctic Convoys of the Second World War
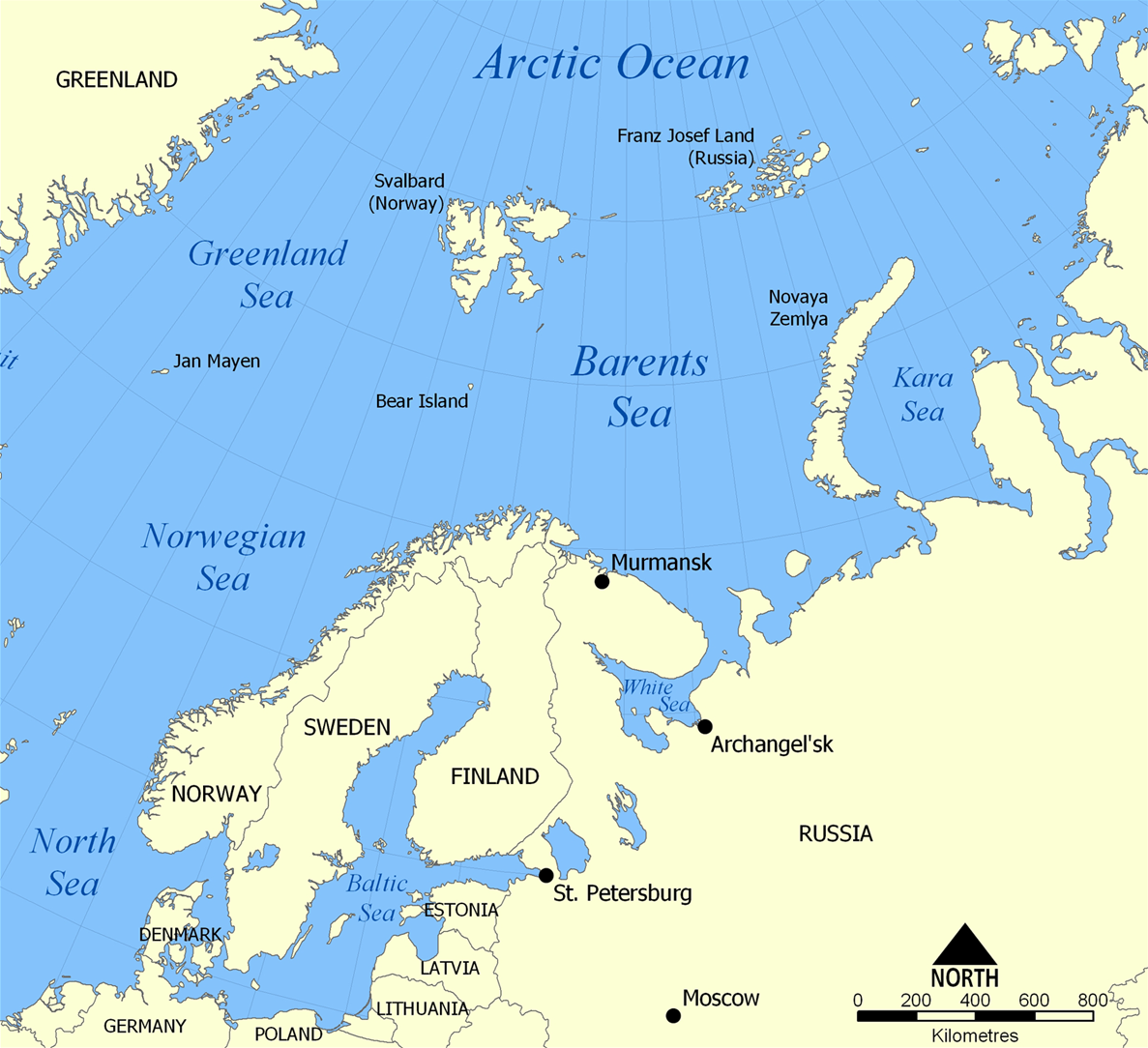
- The Norwegian and the Barents seas, site of the Arctic convoys
Date	8−20/23 December 1941
Location	Arctic Ocean
Result	Allied victory

Belligerents
Royal Navy; Merchant Navy; Soviet Navy; Panama	Kriegsmarine; Luftwaffe

Strength
8 merchant ships; 9 escorts (in relays)	4 destroyers; 2 Junkers Ju 88 bombers

Casualties and losses
2 killed	Nil

Convoy PQ 6 (8−20/23 December 1941) was the seventh of the Arctic convoys of World War II by which the Western Allies supplied military equipment, weapons and raw materials to the Soviet Union after the German invasion on 22 June 1941. The convoy sailed from Hvalfjörður on the western coast of Iceland, on 8 December 1941.

After a storm early in the voyage there were several calm days but the temperature plunged and the crews of all ships had to work hard removing ice from their ships' superstructures. As the convoy approached the entrance to the White Sea, the Eastern local escort, of two British minesweepers, encountered four German destroyers out minelaying. One of the minesweepers was damaged; a cruiser with two Soviet destroyers put to sea from Murmansk but the German destroyers escaped.

Most of the convoy arrived at Molotovsk on 23 December but two ships made port at Murmansk on 20 December after the ships and Soviet Hurricanes chased off two Luftwaffe bombers that had attacked the freighter Dekabrist. The ships at Molotovsk were iced in for the winter in very difficult circumstances.

== Background ==
=== Arctic Ocean ===
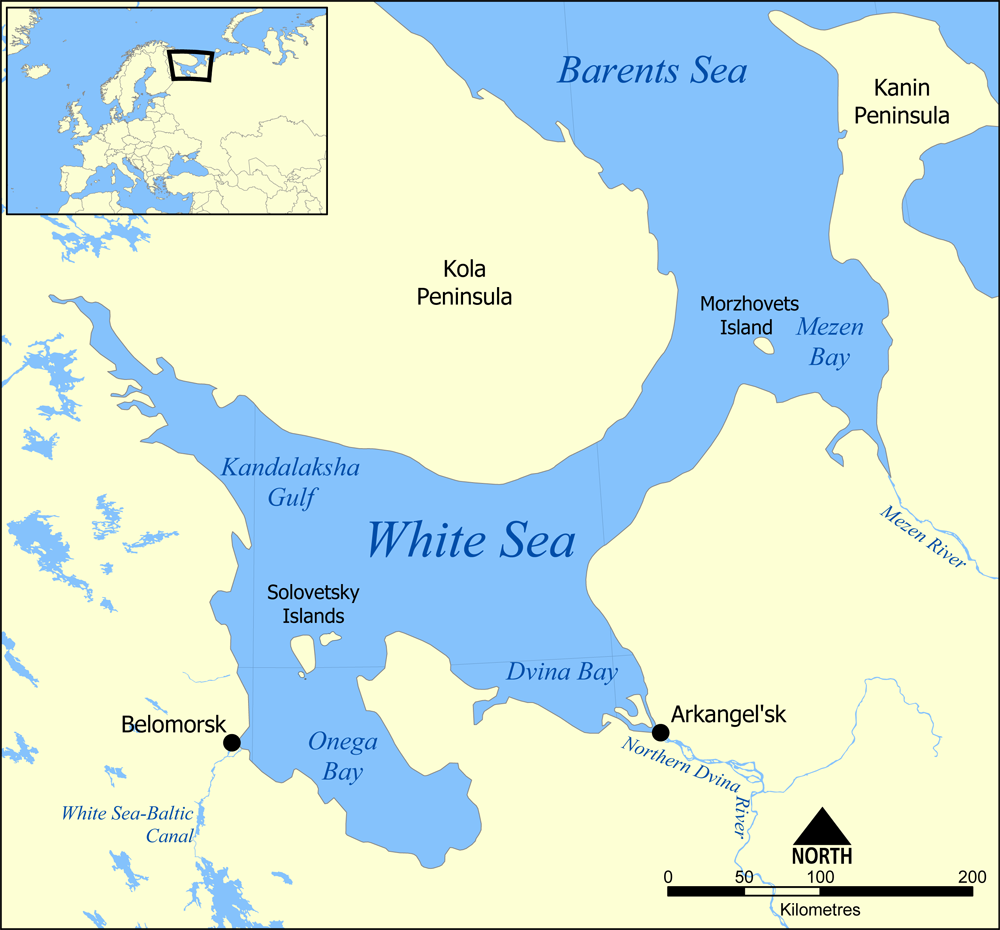
Map of the White Sea showing Arkhangelsk

Between Greenland and Norway are some of the most stormy waters of the world's oceans, 890 mi (1,440 km) of water under gales full of snow, sleet and hail. Around the North Cape and the Barents Sea the sea temperature rarely rises about 4° Celsius and a man in the water would probably die unless rescued immediately. The cold water and air made spray freeze on the superstructure of ships, which had to be removed quickly to avoid the ship becoming top-heavy. The cold Arctic water is met by the Gulf Stream, warm water from the Gulf of Mexico, which becomes the North Atlantic Drift. Arriving at the south-west of England, the drift moves between Scotland and Iceland.

North of Norway the drift splits, one stream of the North Atlantic Drift goes north of Bear Island to Svalbard and the southern stream follows the coast of Murmansk into the Barents Sea. The mingling of cold Arctic water and warmer water of higher salinity generates thick banks of fog for convoys to hide in but the waters drastically reduce the effectiveness of Asdic as U-boats moved in waters of differing temperatures and density. The phenomenon is at its most disruptive of submarine detection near the Kola Inlet. In winter, polar ice can form as far south as 50 mi (80 km) of the North Cape forcing ships closer to Luftwaffe air bases or being able to sail further out to sea in summer when the ice can recede northwards as far as Svalbard. The region is in perpetual darkness in winter and permanent daylight in the summer which makes air reconnaissance almost impossible or easy.

=== Arctic convoys ===
A convoy was defined as at least one merchant ship sailing under the protection of at least one warship. At first the British had intended to run convoys to Russia on a forty-day cycle (the number of days between convoy departures) during the winter of 1941–1942 but this was shortened to a ten-day cycle. The round trip to Murmansk for warships was three weeks and each convoy needed a cruiser and two destroyers, which severely depleted the Home Fleet. Convoys left port and rendezvoused with the escorts at sea. A cruiser provided distant cover from a position to the west of Bear Island. Air support was limited to 330 Squadron and 269 Squadron, RAF Coastal Command from Iceland, with some help from anti-submarine patrols from Sullom Voe, in Shetland, along the coast of Norway. Anti-submarine trawlers escorted the convoys on the first part of the outbound journey. Built for Arctic conditions, the trawlers were coal-burning ships with sufficient endurance. The trawlers were commanded by their peacetime crews and captains with the rank of Skipper, Royal Naval Reserve (RNR), who were used to Arctic conditions, supplemented by anti-submarine specialists of the Royal Naval Volunteer Reserve (RNVR). British minesweepers based at Arkhangelsk met the convoys to join the escort for the remainder of the voyage.

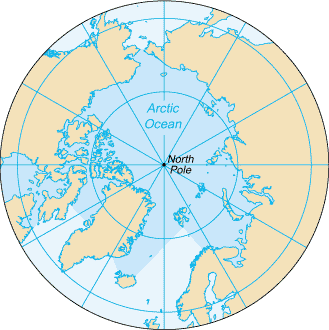
Diagram of the Arctic Ocean

By late 1941, the convoy system used in the Atlantic had been established on the Arctic run; a convoy commodore briefed the ships' masters and signals officers on arrangements for the management of the convoy, that sailed in a formation of long rows of short columns. The commodore was usually a retired naval officer or from the Royal Naval Reserve, his merchant ship flew a white pendant with a blue cross. The commodore was assisted by a Naval signals party of four men, who used lamps, semaphore flags and telescopes to pass signals in code. Codebooks were carried in a weighted bag which was to be dumped overboard to prevent capture. In large convoys, the commodore had a vice- and rear-commodore with whom he directed the speed, course and zig-zagging of the merchant ships and liaised with the escort commander.

In October 1941, the Prime Minister, Winston Churchill, had promised an Arctic convoy to the USSR every ten days. The unloading capacity of Arkhangelsk was 300,000 long tons (300,000 t), Vladivostok (Pacific Route) 140,000 long tons (140,000 t) and 60,000 long tons (61,000 t) in the Persian Gulf (for the Persian Corridor route) ports. The first convoy was due at Murmansk around 12 October and the next convoy was to depart Iceland on 22 October. A motley of British, Allied and neutral shipping, loaded with military stores and raw materials for the Soviet war effort would be assembled at Hvalfjörður (Hvalfiord) in Iceland, convenient for ships from both sides of the Atlantic. In winter, due to the polar ice expanding southwards, the convoy route ran closer to Norway. The voyage was between 1,400 and 2,000 nmi (2,600 and 3,700 km; 1,600 and 2,300 mi) each way, taking at least three weeks for a round trip.

=== First Protocol ===
The Soviet leaders needed to replace the colossal losses of military equipment lost after the German invasion, especially when Soviet war industries were being moved out of the war zone and emphasised tank and aircraft deliveries. Machine tools, steel and aluminium was needed to replace indigenous resources lost in the invasion. The pressure on the civilian sector of the economy needed to be limited by food deliveries. The Soviets wanted to concentrate the resources that remained on items that the Soviet war economy that had the greatest comparative advantage over the German economy. Aluminium imports allowed aircraft production to a far greater extent than would have been possible using local sources and tank production was emphasised at the expense of lorries and food supplies were squeezed by reliance on what could be obtained from lend–lease. At the Moscow Conference, it was acknowledged that 1.5 million tons of shipping was needed to transport the supplies of the First Protocol and that Soviet sources could provide less than 10 per cent of the carrying capacity.

The British and Americans accepted that the onus was on them to find most of the shipping, despite their commitments in other theatres. Churchill made a commitment to send a convoy to the Arctic ports of the USSR every ten days and to deliver 1,200 tanks a month from July 1942 to January 1943, followed by 2,000 tanks and another 3,600 aircraft more than already promised. In November, the US president, Franklin D. Roosevelt, ordered Admiral Emory Land of the US Maritime Commission and then the head of the War Shipping Administration that deliveries to Russia should only be limited by 'insurmountable difficulties'. The first convoy was due at Murmansk around 12 October and the next convoy was to depart Iceland on 22 October. A motley of British, Allied and neutral shipping loaded with military stores and raw materials for the Soviet war effort would be assembled at Hvalfjörður in Iceland, convenient for ships from both sides of the Atlantic.

From Operation Dervish to Convoy PQ 11, the supplies to the USSR were mostly British, in British ships defended by the Royal Navy. A fighter force that could defend Murmansk was delivered that protected the Arctic ports and railways into the hinterland. British supplied aircraft and tanks reinforced the Russian defences of Leningrad and Moscow from December 1941. The tanks and aircraft did not save Moscow but were important in the Soviet counter-offensive. The Luftwaffe was by then reduced to 600 operational aircraft on the Eastern Front, to an extent a consequence of Luftflotte 2 being sent to the Mediterranean against the British. Tanks and aircraft supplied by the British helped the Soviet counter-offensive force back the Germans further than might have been possible. In January and February 1942, deliveries of tanks and aircraft allowed the Russians to have a margin of safety should the Germans attempt to counter-attack.

== Signals intelligence ==
=== Bletchley Park ===
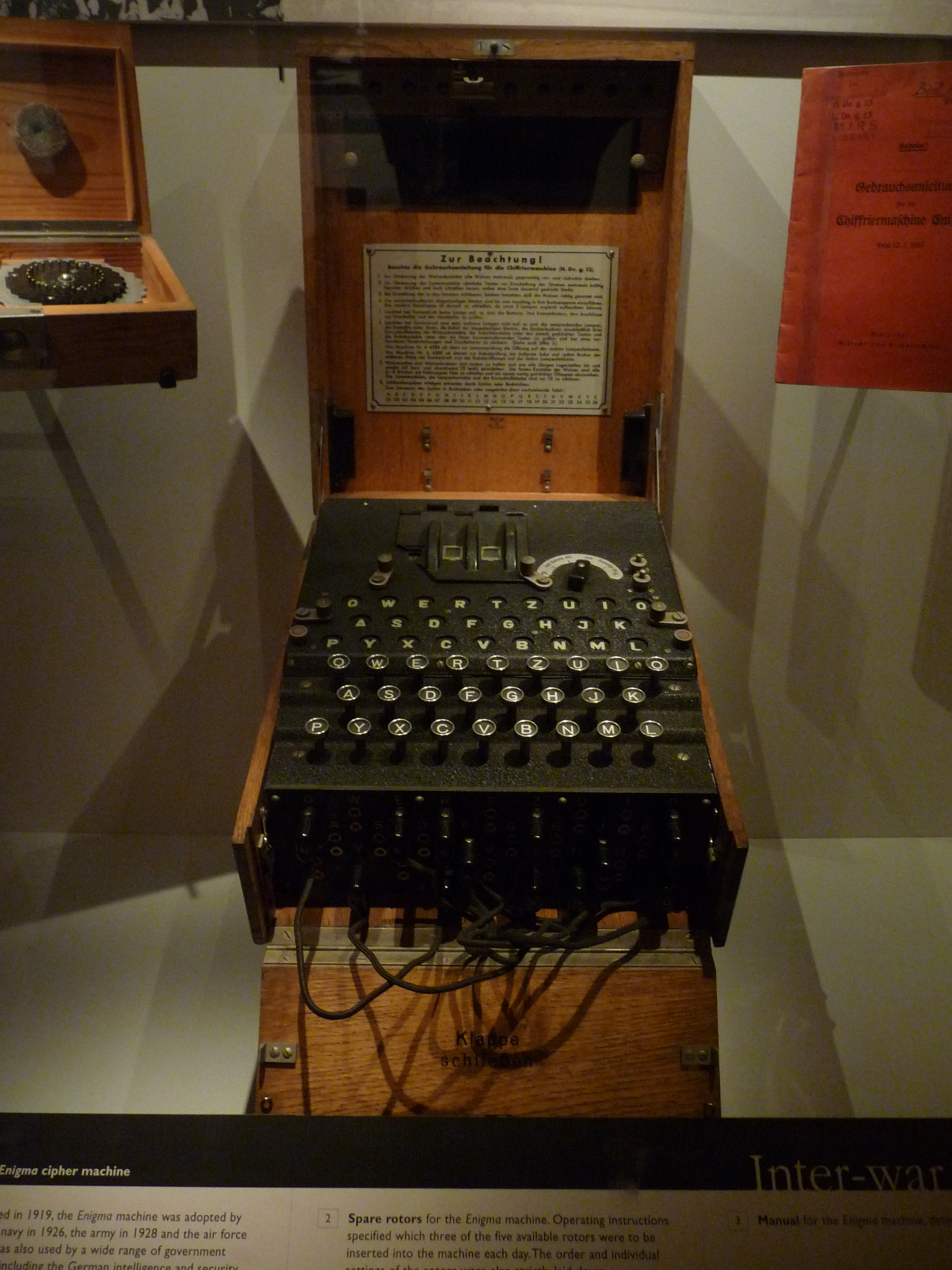
An Enigma coding machine

The British Government Code and Cypher School (GC&CS) based at Bletchley Park housed a small industry of code-breakers and traffic analysts. By June 1941, the German Enigma machine Home Waters (Heimish) settings used by surface ships and U-boats could quickly be read. On 1 February 1942, the Enigma machines used in U-boats in the Atlantic and Mediterranean were changed but German ships and the U-boats in Arctic waters continued with the older Heimish (Hydra from 1942, Dolphin to the British). By mid-1941, British Y-stations were able to read Luftwaffe W/T transmissions and give advance warning of Luftwaffe operations. In 1941, naval Headache personnel with receivers to eavesdrop on Luftwaffe wireless transmissions were embarked on warships.

=== B-Dienst ===
The rival German Beobachtungsdienst (B-Dienst, Observation Service) of the Kriegsmarine Marinenachrichtendienst (MND, Naval Intelligence Service) had broken several Admiralty codes and cyphers by 1939, which were used to help Kriegsmarine ships elude British forces and provide opportunities for surprise attacks. From June to August 1940, six British submarines were sunk in the Skaggerak using information gleaned from British wireless signals. In 1941, B-Dienst read signals from the Commander in Chief Western Approaches informing convoys of areas patrolled by U-boats, enabling the submarines to move into "safe" zones. B-Dienst broke Naval Cypher No 3 in February 1942 and by March was reading up to 80 per cent of the traffic. By coincidence, the British lost access to the Atlantic U-boat communications with the introduction of the Shark cypher and had no information to send in Cypher No 3 which might compromise Ultra.

== Prelude ==
=== Kriegsmarine ===
German naval forces in Norway were commanded by Hermann Böhm, the Kommandierender Admiral Norwegen. Two U-boats were based in Norway in July 1941, four in September, five in December and four in January 1942. By mid-February twenty U-boats were anticipated in the region, with six based in Norway, two in Narvik or Tromsø, two at Trondheim and two at Bergen. Hitler contemplated establishing a unified command but decided against it. The German battleship Tirpitz arrived at Trondheim on 16 January, the first ship of a general transfer of surface ships to Norway. British convoys to Russia had received little attention, since they averaged only eight ships each and the long Arctic winter nights negated even the limited Luftwaffe effort that was available.

=== Luftflotte 5 ===
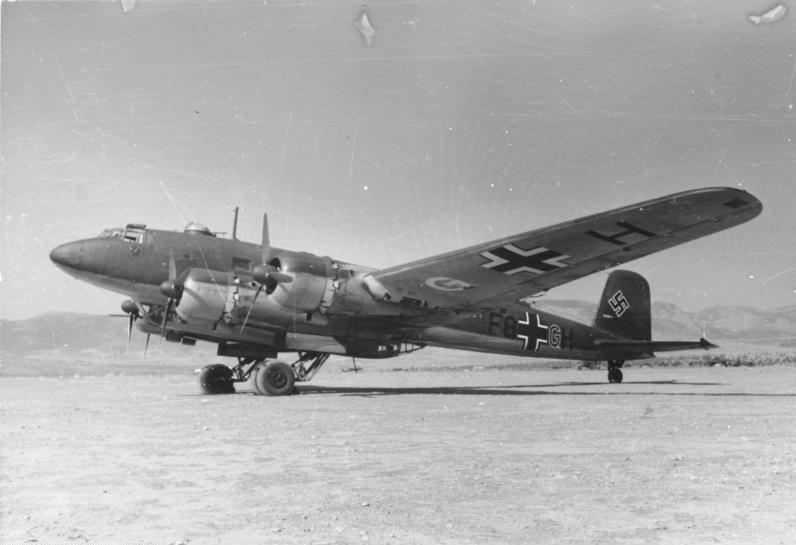
A Focke-Wulf Fw 200 Kondor of KG 40

In mid-1941, Luftflotte 5 (Air Fleet 5) had been re-organised for Operation Barbarossa when Luftgau Norwegen (Air Region Norway) was headquartered in Oslo. Fliegerführer Stavanger (Air Commander Stavanger) the centre and north of Norway, Jagdfliegerführer Norwegen (Fighter Leader Norway) commanded the fighter force and Fliegerführer Kerkenes (Oberst [colonel] Andreas Nielsen) in the far north had airfields at Kirkenes and Banak. The Air Fleet had 180 aircraft, sixty of which were reserved for operations on the Karelian Front against the Red Army. The distance from Banak to Arkhangelsk was 560 mi (900 km) and Fliegerführer Kerkenes had only ten Junkers Ju 88 bombers of Kampfgeschwader 30, thirty Stukas, ten Messerschmitt Bf 109 fighters of Jagdgeschwader 77, five Messerschmitt Bf 110 heavy fighters of Zerstörergeschwader 76, ten reconnaissance aircraft and an anti-aircraft battalion.

Sixty aircraft were far from adequate in such a climate and terrain where "there is no favourable season for operations" (Earl F. Ziemke). The emphasis of air operations changed from army support to anti-shipping operations as Allied Arctic convoys became more frequent. Hubert Schmundt, the Admiral Nordmeer noted gloomily on 22 December 1941 that the number long-range reconnaissance aircraft was exiguous and from 1 to 15 December only two Ju 88 sorties had been possible. After the Lofoten Raids (Operation Claymore) Schmundt wanted Luftflotte 5 to transfer aircraft to northern Norway but its commander, Generaloberst Hans-Jürgen Stumpff, was reluctant to deplete the defences of western Norway. Despite this some air units were transferred, a catapult ship (Katapultschiff), MS Schwabenland, was sent to northern Norway and Heinkel He 115 floatplane torpedo-bombers, of Küstenfliegergruppe 1./406 was transferred to Sola. By the end of 1941, III Gruppe, KG 30 had been transferred to Norway and in the new year, another Staffel of Focke-Wulf Fw 200 Kondors from Kampfgeschwader 40 (KG 40) had arrived. Luftflotte 5 was also expected to receive a Gruppe comprising three Staffeln (squadrons) of Heinkel He 111 torpedo-bombers.

==== Air-sea rescue ====
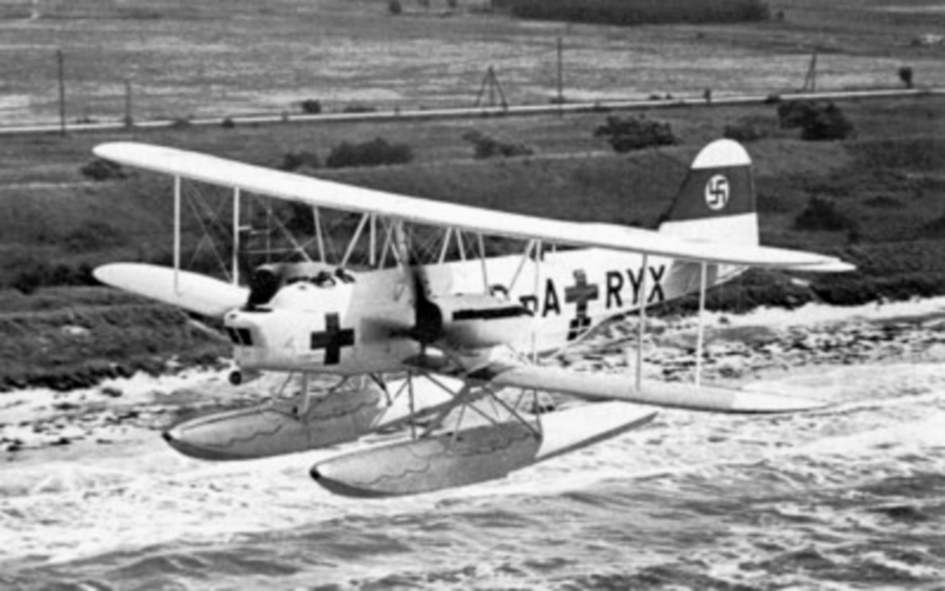
Example of a Heinkel He 59 search and rescue aircraft (1940)

The Luftwaffe Sea Rescue Service (Seenotdienst) along with the Kriegsmarine, the Norwegian Society for Sea Rescue (RS) and ships on passage, recovered aircrew and shipwrecked sailors. The service comprised Seenotbereich VIII at Stavanger, covering Bergen and Trondheim with Seenotbereich IX at Kirkenes for Tromsø, Billefjord and Kirkenes. Co-operation was as important in rescues as it was in anti-shipping operations if people were to be saved before they succumbed to the climate and severe weather.

The sea rescue aircraft comprised Heinkel He 59 floatplanes with Dornier Do 18 and Dornier Do 24 seaplanes. Oberkommando der Luftwaffe (OKL, the high command of the Luftwaffe) was not able to increase the number of search and rescue aircraft in Norway, due to a general shortage of aircraft and crews, despite Stumpff pointing out that coming down in such cold waters required extremely swift recovery and that his crews "must be given a chance of rescue" or morale could not be maintained.

=== Convoy PQ 6 ===
The convoy consisted of the British SS Elona, SS Empire Mavis, SS Explorer and SS Zamalek (rescue ship) a Norwegian freighter, SS Mirlo, two Panamanian ships, SS Mount Evans and the tanker SS El Oceano and the Soviet SS Dekabrist. The Convoy Commodore was embarked in Elona and the Vice-Commodore in Empire Mavis; the ships sailed on 8 December.

=== SS Explorer ===
Explorer had sailed from Loch Ewe on 20 November, loaded with military equipment; the crew had been issued with Arctic clothing, a fur-lined duffel coat, two pairs of heavy woollen long johns, a submariners' polo-necked jersey, mittens and thick sea-boot socks, all looked on with suspicion by the crew. Merchant navy pay had recently been increased from £8 to £24 a month by the addition of danger money. Explorer carried Defensively equipped merchant ship (Dems) gunners and the crew had received basic gunnery training at HMS President. While at Hvalfjörður cargo was taken on from another ship and two of the crew got frostbite in their hands.

== Voyage ==
=== 8–11 December ===
Icelandic anchorages

The convoy departed Hvalfjörður on 8 December 1941 in company with the Iceland local escort, the trawlers HMT Cape Argona, HMT Hugh Walpole and HMT Stella Capella, from 8 to 10 December. The convoy soon ran into a storm and in the dark, Harmatris lagged behind. The captain, R. W. Brundle, hove to for safety. HMS Edinburgh a Town-class cruiser, had sailed from Scapa Flow in the Orkney Islands on 7 December, was caught by the same storm and reached Seyðisfjörður (Seidisfjord) on the east coast on Iceland on 10 December to refuel. The cruiser sailed at 4:00 p.m. with the destroyers Echo and Escapade, the storm having abated by then. The cruiser and destroyers joined the convoy on 11 December, taking over from the trawler Hugh Walpole, the sole remaining local escort, that returned to Iceland.

==== SS Harmatris ====
On 10 December aboard Harmatris, steam was seen rising over No. 4 'tween deck (storage space between the hold and the main deck) and when the hatch corner was lifted a lorry was seen to be on fire, sliding around as the ship moved, setting other cargo alight, made worse by the 10 long tons (10 t) of cordite and small-arms ammunition loaded in the hold below the 'tween deck. The area was smothered with steam but this failed to extinguish the fire. The Mate, wearing the only smoke helmet, dragged a hose into the hold and taking turns with the chief Steward, fought the fire. Brundle broke wireless silence to send an SOS and the rescue ship Zamalek turned back from the convoy to help. The crew fought the fire during the night and eventually put it out; not needed, Zamalek sailed back to Iceland. Hvalfjörður was windward (upwind) and had no harbour facilities and the convoy commodore allowed the ship to make for the Clyde, where Harmatris spent Christmas and departed for Hvalfjörður again on 26 December, arriving on 1 January 1942.

=== 12–13 December ===
72nd parallel north (interactive map)

The weather continued to be fine, the temperature close to freezing point but despite this, the merchant ships found station keeping difficult. On 13 December, a Saturday, to the north of the 72nd parallel in the short winter day, Edinburgh left the convoy for gunnery practice, firing star shells for the Oerlikon gunners to fire at, until night fell and the cruiser returned to the convoy, by then having reached its most northerly point, 300 nmi (560 km; 350 mi) west of Bear Island (Bjørnøya) where the aurora borealis appeared. Work continued on the merchant ships, Explorer had a four-man deck watch, one more than in peacetime who took turns as helmsman, lookout and two on the gun positions. The four men not on watch spent their time clearing ice, a job that the warships could put far more men on.

=== 14–23 December ===
Murman Coast in red

As the convoy turned south, Edinburgh refuelled Escapade and the boiler fuel was so cold that it coagulated. Refuelling parties on both ships kept watch on the fuel pipe during the short twilight of the winter day. On 17 December, off the Murman coast, Edinburgh received reports that as the Eastern local escort, the Halcyon-class minesweepers HMS Hazard and Speedy, swept the approaches to the Kola Inlet, they had encountered German destroyers. The Z23, Z24, Z25 and Z27 all Type 1936A-class destroyers of the 8th Destroyer Flotilla (Fregattenkapitän Gottfried Pönitz) were out minelaying, the first attempt by the Kriegsmarine to attack an Arctic convoy. The British minesweepers were mistakenly identified as G-class destroyers and were lucky to escape in the gloom of the winter day, behind a smoke screen. The German destroyers fired star shell and managed four hits on Speedy that had to return to the Kola Inlet, while Hazard remained to meet the convoy.

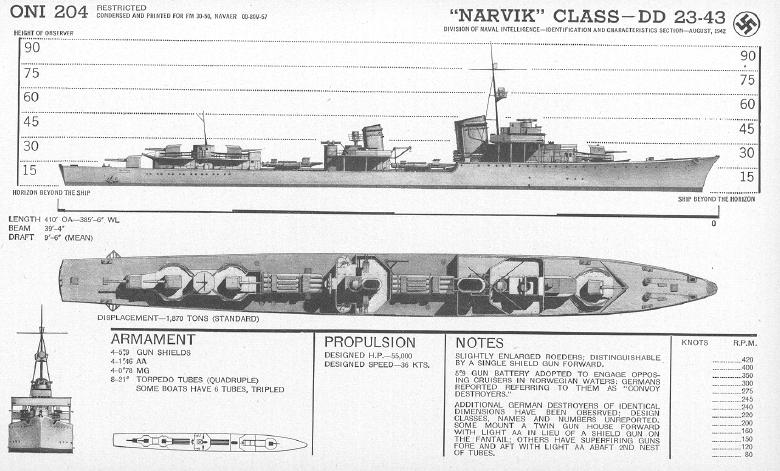
Wartime Allied recognition manual drawing of the Type 1936A-class destroyer

As soon as the alarm was raised, HMS Kent, a County-class cruiser, at Murmansk since 13 December, having escorted Convoy PQ 5 and the Soviet Gnevny-class destroyers Grozny and Sokrushitelny sailed to attack the destroyers but found nothing. The minesweeper HMS Leda sailed to replace Speedy, met Escapade and with Hazard joined the convoy. When Convoy PQ 6 was off the White Sea Throat (Gorlo) the entrance to the White Sea, Edinburgh, Echo and Escapade left the convoy and turned towards Murmansk with the freighters Dekabrist and El Mirlo, as the minesweepers led the remainder of the convoy into Molotovsk (now Severodvinsk). On 23 December as the ships followed a Soviet icebreaker, they were caught in the ice and had to spend the winter there.

The ships making for Murmansk sailed into a storm and El Mirlo disappeared. Escapade was sent to look for El Mirlo and Echo escorted Dekabrist towards Murmansk at 18 kn (33 km/h; 21 mph). Not long afterwards, gunfire was heard, Edinburgh turned in pursuit and found Dekabrist and Echo under attack by two Junkers Ju 88 bombers. Dekabrist was near-missed and was hit by two unexploded bombs that rolled around the deck. As Echo accelerated, two men were swept overboard. Edinburgh and six Voenno-Vozdushnye Sily (VVS, Soviet Air Forces) Hurricane fighters chased off the bombers. In the afternoon the ships anchored off Murmansk and found that El Mirlo was already there. The winter freeze had started and on 20 December the ships of Convoy QP 4 passed in the opposite direction behind the icebreakers Stalin and Lenin; another icebreaker led the rest of Convoy PQ 6 into harbour, the ships arriving on 23 November.

== Aftermath ==
=== Analysis ===
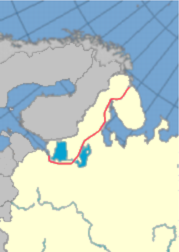
Rail link brtween Murmansk and Leningrad

The convoy arrived at the Gorlo where icebreakers kept a passage open until 12 December. The closing of the White Sea by ice meant that subsequent convoys, beginning with Convoy PQ 7 would have to use Murmansk, Admiral Golovko wrote in his diary for 10 December,

Matters are evidently moving in favour of Murmansk becoming the reception point for convoys.

and on 25 December wrote,

The signs are that cargo vessels will sail into Murmansk. Now there is no end to our troubles.

German knowledge of the Arctic convoys was so limited that there were no attacks by the Kriegsmarine or the Luftwaffe from Operation Dervish to Convoy PQ 5, the Kriegsmarine having only five torpedo boats (small destroyers) not suited to operations in Arctic waters. The convoy was part of a run of outbound convoys to Convoy PQ 11 that had little difficulty apart from the weather, in reaching the Arctic north of the USSR. These convoys delivered 75 ships out of 77, with one early return and one loss to a U-boat.

=== Casualties ===
On Echo two members of the crew were swept overboard and lost at sea.

=== Subsequent events ===
The ships were frozen in for the winter along with their icebreaker, in conditions that became desperate. The water, washing facilities and the toilets froze and scabies broke out amongst the crews. The ships were unloaded by German prisoners of war who scavenged for food that the crews threw overboard because it was in so poor a state. Despite their difficulties, the Russians brought Yak carcasses alongside the ships on sleds.

== British order of battle ==
=== Convoyed ships ===
Merchant ships (Note: Convoys had a standard formation of short columns, number 1 to the left in the direction of travel. Each position in the column was numbered; 11 was the first ship in column 1 and 12 was the second ship in the column; 21 was the first ship in column 2.)
Ship	Year	Flag	GRT	P'n	Notes
SS Dekabrist	1903	Soviet Union	7,363	22	
SS El Oceano	1925	Panama	6,767	13	Tanker
SS Elona	1936	Merchant Navy	6,192	21	Convoy Commodore
SS Empire Mavis	1919	Merchant Navy	5,704	11	Vice-Commodore
SS Explorer	1935	Merchant Navy	6,235	24	
SS Mirlo	1922	Norway	7,455	23	
SS Mount Evans	1919	Panama	6,267	12	
Convoy rescue ship
SS Zamalek	1921	Merchant Navy	1,567	14	

=== Convoy formation ===
Order of sail (Note: Convoys had a standard formation of short columns, number 1 to the left in the direction of travel. Each position in the column was numbered; 11 was the first ship in column 1 and 12 was the second ship in the column; 21 was the first ship in column 2.)
column 1	column 2
11 Empire Mavis	21 Elona
12 Mount Evans	22 SS Dekabrist
13 El Oceano	23 Mirlo
14 Zamalek	24 Explorer

=== Escorts ===
Convoy escorts
Ship	Flag	Type	Notes
Iceland local escort
HMT Cape Argona	Royal Navy	ASW trawler	8–10 December
HMT Hugh Walpole	Royal Navy	ASW trawler	8–11 December
HMT Stella Capella	Royal Navy	ASW trawler	8–10 December
Oceanic escort
HMS Edinburgh	Royal Navy	Town-class cruiser	11–20 December
HMS Echo	Royal Navy	E-class destroyer	11–20 December
HMS Escapade	Royal Navy	E-class destroyer	11–20 December
Murmansk local escort
HMS Hazard	Royal Navy	Halcyon-class minesweeper	19–20 December
HMS Leda	Royal Navy	Halcyon-class minesweeper	19–20 December replaced Speedy
HMS Speedy	Royal Navy	Halcyon-class minesweeper	17 December, damaged by German destroyers, returned
Other ships
HMS Kent	Royal Navy	County-class cruiser	18 December
Grozny	Soviet Navy	Gnevny-class destroyer	18 December
Sokrushitelny	Soviet Navy	Gnevny-class destroyer	18 December

== German order of battle ==
Kriegsmarine−Luftwaffe anti-convoy operation
Boat	Flag	Type	Notes
Ships
Z23	Kriegsmarine	Type 1936A-class destroyer	
Z24	Kriegsmarine	Type 1936A-class destroyer	
Z25	Kriegsmarine	Type 1936A-class destroyer	
Z26	Kriegsmarine	Type 1936A-class destroyer	
Aircraft
	Luftwaffe	Junkers Ju 88	Two aircraft

== Bibliography ==
- Boog, H.; Rahn, W.; Stumpf, R.; Wegner, B. (2001). The Global War: Widening of the Conflict into a World War and the Shift of the Initiative 1941–1943. Germany in the Second World War. Vol. VI. Translated by Osers, E.; Brownjohn, J.; Crampton, P.; Willmot, L. (Eng trans. Oxford University Press, London ed.). Potsdam: Militärgeschichtliches Forschungsamt (Research Institute for Military History). ISBN 0-19-822888-0.
  - Rahn, W. "Part III, the War at Sea in the Atlantic and in the Arctic Ocean. III. The Conduct of the War in the Atlantic and the Coastal Area (b) The Third Phase, April–December 1941: The Extension of the Areas of Operations". In Boog et al. (2001).
- Boyd, Andrew (2024). Arms for Russia & the Naval War in the Arctic 1941–1945. Barnsley: Seaforth (Pen & Sword). ISBN 978-1-3990-3886-7.
- Budiansky, S. (2000). Battle of Wits: The Complete Story of Codebreaking in World War II. New York: The Free Press (Simon & Schuster). ISBN 0-684-85932-7 – via Archive Foundation.
- Butler, J. R. M. (1964). Grand Strategy: June 1941 – August 1942 (Part II). History of the Second World War, United Kingdom Military Series. Vol. III. London: HMSO. OCLC 504770038.
- Claasen, A. R. A. (2001). Hitler's Northern War: The Luftwaffe's Ill-fated Campaign, 1940–1945. Lawrence, KS: University Press of Kansas. ISBN 0-7006-1050-2.
- Hinsley, F. H. (1994) [1993]. British Intelligence in the Second World War: Its Influence on Strategy and Operations. History of the Second World War, United Kingdom Military Series (2nd rev. abr. ed.). London: HMSO. ISBN 978-0-11-630961-7.
- Howard, M. (1972). Grand Strategy: August 1942 – September 1943. History of the Second World War United Kingdom Military Series. Vol. IV. London: HMSO. ISBN 978-0-11-630075-1 – via Archive Foundation.
- Jordan, Roger W. (2006) [1999]. The World's Merchant Fleets 1939: The Particulars and Wartime Fates of 6,000 Ships (2nd ed.). London: Chatham/Lionel Leventhal. ISBN 978-1-86176-293-1.
- Kahn, D. (1973) [1967]. The Codebreakers: The Story of Secret Writing (10th abr. Signet, Chicago ed.). New York: Macmillan. LCCN 63-16109. OCLC 78083316.
- Kemp, Paul (1993). Convoy! Drama in Arctic Waters. London: Arms and Armour Press. ISBN 1-85409-130-1 – via Archive Foundation.
- Macksey, K. (2004) [2003]. The Searchers: Radio Intercept in two World Wars (Cassell Military Paperbacks ed.). London: Cassell. ISBN 978-0-304-36651-4.
- Mitchell, W. H.; Sawyer, L. A. (1990). The Empire Ships (2nd ed.). London, New York, Hamburg, Hong Kong: Lloyd's of London Press Ltd. ISBN 1-85044-275-4.
- Rohwer, Jürgen; Hümmelchen, Gerhard (2005) [1972]. Chronology of the War at Sea, 1939–1945: The Naval History of World War Two (3rd rev. ed.). London: Chatham. ISBN 1-86176-257-7.
- Roskill, S. W. (1957) [1954]. Butler, J. R. M. (ed.). The War at Sea 1939–1945: The Defensive. History of the Second World War United Kingdom Military Series. Vol. I (4th impr. ed.). London: HMSO. OCLC 881709135.
- Roskill, S. W. (1962) [1957]. Butler, J. R. M. (ed.). The War at Sea 1939–1945: The Period of Balance. History of the Second World War. Vol. II (3rd impr. ed.). London: HMSO. OCLC 174453986.
- Ruegg, R.; Hague, A. (1993) [1992]. Convoys to Russia: Allied Convoys and Naval Surface Operations in Arctic Waters 1941–1945 (2nd rev. enl. ed.). Kendal: World Ship Society. ISBN 0-905617-66-5.
- Woodman, Richard (1994). Arctic Convoys 1941–1945 (hbk. ed.). London: John Murray. ISBN 0-7195-5079-3.
- Woodman, Richard (2004) [1994]. Arctic Convoys 1941–1945. London: John Murray. ISBN 978-0-7195-5752-1.
- Ziemke, Earl F. (1959). The German Northern Theatre of Operations 1940–1945. Department of the Army pamphlets (20-271). Washington, DC: Department of the Army. OCLC 467919261.
