= Soviet destroyer Grozny =

Destroyer of the Soviet Navy

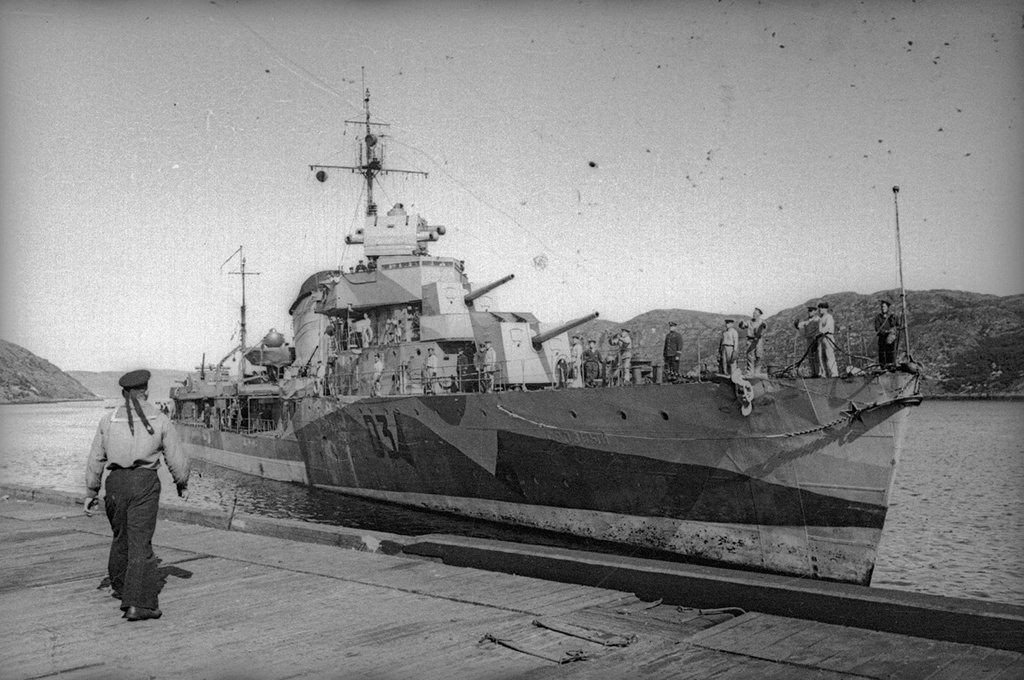
- Grozny in 1941

History

Soviet Union
- Name: Grozny (Грозный (Formidable))
- Ordered: 2nd Five-Year Plan
- Builder: Shipyard No. 190 (Zhdanov), Leningrad
- Laid down: 21 December 1935
- Launched: 31 July 1936
- Completed: 9 December 1938
- Renamed: TsL-74, 18 April 1958
- Reclassified: As a target ship, 18 April 1958
- Stricken: 15 September 1960
- Honors and awards: Order of the Red Banner, 6 March 1945
- Fate: Scrapped after 15 September 1960

General characteristics (Gnevny as completed, 1938)
- Class & type: Gnevny-class destroyer
- Displacement: 1,612 t (1,587 long tons) (standard)
- Length: 112.8 m (370 ft 1 in) (o/a)
- Beam: 10.2 m (33 ft 6 in)
- Draft: 4.8 m (15 ft 9 in)
- Installed power: 3 water-tube boilers; 48,000 shp (36,000 kW)
- Propulsion: 2 shafts; 2 geared steam turbines
- Speed: 38 knots (70 km/h; 44 mph)
- Range: 2,720 nmi (5,040 km; 3,130 mi) at 19 knots (35 km/h; 22 mph)
- Complement: 197 (236 wartime)
- Sensors & processing systems: Mars hydrophone
- Armament: 4 × single 130 mm (5.1 in) guns; 2 × single 76.2 mm (3 in) AA guns; 2 × single 45 mm (1.8 in) AA guns; 2 × single 12.7 mm (0.50 in) AA machineguns; 2 × triple 533 mm (21 in) torpedo tubes; 60–96 mines; 2 × depth charge racks, 25 depth charges

Grozny (Russian: Грозный, lit. 'Formidable') was one of 29 Gnevny-class destroyers (officially known as Project 7) built for the Soviet Navy during the late 1930s. Completed in 1938, she was initially assigned to the Baltic Fleet before being transferred to the Northern Fleet in mid-1939 where she participated in the 1939–1940 Winter War against the Finns.

Still under repair when the Germans invaded the Soviet Union in June 1941, the ship was initially tasked to lay minefields after the repairs were completed in July. Grozny then began escorting Soviet convoys, but then started escorting Allied Arctic convoys transporting weapons and supplies to the Soviets which she continued to do almost to the end of the war in 1945. The ship provided naval gunfire support to Soviet troops along the Arctic coast in late 1941, but was not called upon to do so afterwards. From then on Grozny's primary task was convoy escort, both Soviet and Allied. The ship ran aground after an emergency refueling of one of her sisters in early 1942, but she was pulled off and repaired. In 1943 and 1944, Grozny participated in several unsuccessful attempts to intercept German supply ships along the Norwegian coast.

After the war, the ship rejoined the Baltic Fleet in 1948 and later received a lengthy modernization that lasted until 1956. She was redesignated as a target ship in 1958; stricken from the Navy List in 1960 and was subsequently scrapped.

== Design and description ==
Having decided on the specifications of the large 40-knot (74 km/h; 46 mph) Leningrad-class destroyer leaders, the Soviet Navy sought Italian assistance in designing smaller and cheaper destroyers. They licensed the plans for the Folgore class and, in modifying it for their purposes, overloaded a design that was already somewhat marginally stable.

The Gnevnys had an overall length of 112.8 m (370 ft), a beam of 10.2 m (33 ft), and a draft of 4.8 m (16 ft) at deep load. The ships were significantly overweight, almost 200 t (197 long tons) heavier than designed, displacing 1,612 t (1,587 long tons) at standard load and 2,039 t (2,007 long tons) at deep load. Their crew numbered 197 officers and sailors in peacetime and 236 in wartime. The ships had a pair of geared steam turbines, each driving one propeller, rated to produce 48,000 shaft horsepower (36,000 kW) using steam from three water-tube boilers, which were intended to give them a maximum speed of 37 knots (69 km/h; 43 mph). The designers had been conservative in rating the turbines, and many of the ships handily exceeded their designed speed during their sea trials. Others fell considerably short of it. Grozny reached 36 kn (67 km/h; 41 mph) during her trials. Variations in fuel oil capacity meant that the range of the Gnevnys varied between 1,670 and 3,145 nautical miles (3,093 and 5,825 km; 1,922 and 3,619 mi) at 19 knots (35 km/h; 22 mph). Grozny demonstrated a range of 1,690 nmi (3,130 km; 1,940 mi) at that speed in 1943.

As built, the Gnevny-class ships mounted four 130 mm (5.1 in) B-13 guns in two pairs of superfiring single mounts fore and aft of the superstructure. Antiaircraft defense was provided by a pair of 76.2 mm (3 in) 34-K AA guns in single mounts and a pair of 45 mm (1.8 in) 21-K AA guns, as well as two 12.7 mm (0.50 in) DK machine guns. They carried six 533 mm (21.0 in) torpedo tubes in two rotating triple mounts; each tube was provided with a reload. The ships could also carry a maximum of either 60 or 95 mines and 25 depth charges. They were fitted with a set of Mars hydrophones for antisubmarine work, although they were useless at speeds over 3 knots (5.6 km/h; 3.5 mph). The ships were equipped with two K-1 paravanes intended to destroy mines and a pair of depth-charge throwers.

=== Modifications ===
In 1943, Grozny had her 21-K guns replaced by four 37-millimeter (1.5 in) 70-K AA guns in single mounts and three twin-gun mounts for Lend-Lease, water-cooled 12.7 mm Colt-Browning machine guns and two single mounts for improved DShK machine guns. Two additional 70-K mounts were added in 1944. By the end of the war, she had received a British ASDIC system and an American SF-1 early-warning radar. After the war, all of her AA guns were replaced by eight water-cooled V-11M versions of the 70-K gun in twin mounts and her electronics were replaced by Soviet systems.

== Construction and service ==
Built in Leningrad's Shipyard No. 190 (Zhdanov) as yard number 502, Grozny was laid down on 21 December 1935, launched on 31 July 1936, and was completed on 9 December 1938. The ship was assigned to the Baltic Fleet before she was transferred to the Northern Fleet via the White Sea Canal in May 1939. She covered Soviet forces attacking the Finnish towns of Petsamo and Liinakhamari in the Arctic on 30 November–2 December 1939 at the beginning of the Winter War. On 2–3 January 1940, Grozny and her sister ship Gromky helped to cover the laying of a minefield off Petsamo. After the war, the ship was under repair from November to 8 June 1941. (Note: Platonov says that she was under repair until 20 July at Molotovsk.)

Now assigned to the 1st Destroyer Division of the fleet, Grozny, together with her sister Sokrushitelny and the minelayer Kanin, helped to lay 275 mines on 23–24 July at the entrance to the White Sea. Four days later, Grozny laid 54 mines as part of a minefield in Kandalaksha Gulf. From 10 to 18 August, the ship escorted convoys along the coast of Karelia. Together with Sokrushitelny, she escorted ships full of evacuees from the Arctic island of Spitzbergen through the White Sea to Arkhangelsk on 23–24 August; a week later, Grozny, Sokrushitelny and the destroyers Valerian Kuybyshev and Uritsky escorted the first supply convoy from Britain to the same destination. On 10–15 September, Grozny and her sisters in the 1st Destroyer Division (Sokrushitelny, Gremyashchy and Gromky) laid a pair of minefields off the Rybachy Peninsula using British mines delivered by the minelayer HMS Adventure. Grozny bombarded German positions near the Zapadnaya Litsa River on 24 October with 114 shells from her 130 mm guns and followed that up with a total of 246 more shells on 2, 4 and 10 November. Escorted by Grozny and Sokrushitelny, the heavy cruiser HMS Kent sortied on 17 December in an unsuccessful attempt to intercept the German 8th Destroyer Flotilla that had engaged two British minesweepers attempting to rendezvous with Convoy PQ 6. Five days later, Grozny shelled German positions near the Zapadnaya Litsa River with 112 rounds from her main guns.

After refitting in January 1942, Grozny, together with Gromky, escorted the light cruiser HMS Nigeria to rendezvous with Convoy PQ 11 on 20 February, but the destroyers were forced to return to port because of a strong storm. It frustrated a subsequent attempts two days later, but they were finally able to meet the convoy that evening. On 5 March Grozny sailed to rescue Gromky which had run out of fuel. After transferring 117 metric tons (115 long tons) of oil, Grozny accidentally ran aground on 7 March and damaged one propeller and her rudder. She was pulled off and was limited to 10 knots (19 km/h; 12 mph). Permanent repairs began on 23 March and lasted until 8 May. The ship escorted Convoy QP 12 on 21–23 May and then helped to escort Convoy PQ 16 on 28–30 May. A month later, Grozny was one of the escorts for Convoy QP 13. The ship was refitted and had her boilers replaced from August to 19 March 1943. Together with the destroyer leader Baku and Gromky, Grozny unsuccessfully attempted to intercept German supply ships along the coast of Norway on 27–28 and 30–31 March. In mid-May, the ship began escorting local convoys in the Barents and White Seas. She was refitted again from mid-September until early November.

In addition to local convoys, Grozny escorted Allied ships from Convoy JW 54A through the White Sea to Arkhangelsk on 24–25 November and then Convoy RA 54 from Molotovsk through the Barents Sea into the Arctic Ocean on 27–28 November before handing over escort duties to British ships. The ship was one of the local escorts for Convoy JW 55A on 21–22 December. Another attempt by Grozny and three other destroyers to intercept German supply ships off the Norwegian coast on 20–22 January 1944 was unsuccessful. She rendezvoused with Convoy JW 56A on 26 January and helped to escort it into Kola Bay. Grozny was one of the escorts for ships from Convoy JW 56B that continued onwards to Arkhangelsk on 1–2 February. The next day she escorted Convoy RA 56 outbound from Murmansk and then a Soviet convoy from Murmansk to Arkhangelsk on 8–9 March. The ship then escorted a Soviet convoy in the opposite direction on 26–28 April so that the ships could join Convoy RA 59. Grozny then spent the next several months escorting convoys in the White and Barents Seas. She was refitted from mid-September to mid-November. The ship spent the rest of the war escorting Soviet convoys in the Arctic, except for escorting Convoy JW 63 on 7–8 January 1945. Grozny was awarded the Order of the Red Banner on 6 March.

After the war, the ship was transferred back to the Baltic Fleet on 26 June 1948 and later received a lengthy modernization that lasted until 21 August 1956. Grozny was redesignated as a target ship on 19 April 1958 and renamed TsL-74. She was stricken on 15 September 1960 and was subsequently scrapped.

== Sources ==
- Berezhnoy, Sergey (2002). Крейсера и миноносцы. Справочник [Guide to Cruisers and Destroyers] (in Russian). Moscow: Voenizdat. ISBN 5-203-01780-8.
- Budzbon, Przemysaw (1980). "Soviet Union". In Chesneau, Roger (ed.). Conway's All the World's Fighting Ships 1922–1946. Greenwich, UK: Conway Maritime Press. pp. 318–346. ISBN 0-85177-146-7.
- Hill, Alexander (2018). Soviet Destroyers of World War II. New Vanguard. Vol. 256. Oxford, UK: Osprey Publishing. ISBN 978-1-4728-2256-7.
- Platonov, Andrey V. (2002). Энциклопедия советских надводных кораблей 1941–1945 [Encyclopedia of Soviet Surface Ships 1941–1945] (in Russian). Saint Petersburg: Poligon. ISBN 5-89173-178-9.
- Rohwer, Jürgen (2005). Chronology of the War at Sea 1939–1945: The Naval History of World War Two (Third Revised ed.). Annapolis, Maryland: Naval Institute Press. ISBN 1-59114-119-2.
- Rohwer, Jürgen & Monakov, Mikhail S. (2001). Stalin's Ocean-Going Fleet. London: Frank Cass. ISBN 0-7146-4895-7.
- Yakubov, Vladimir & Worth, Richard (2008). "The Soviet Project 7/7U Destroyers". In Jordan, John & Dent, Stephen (eds.). Warship 2008. London: Conway. pp. 99–114. ISBN 978-1-84486-062-3.
