= HMS Escapade =

British E-class destroyer

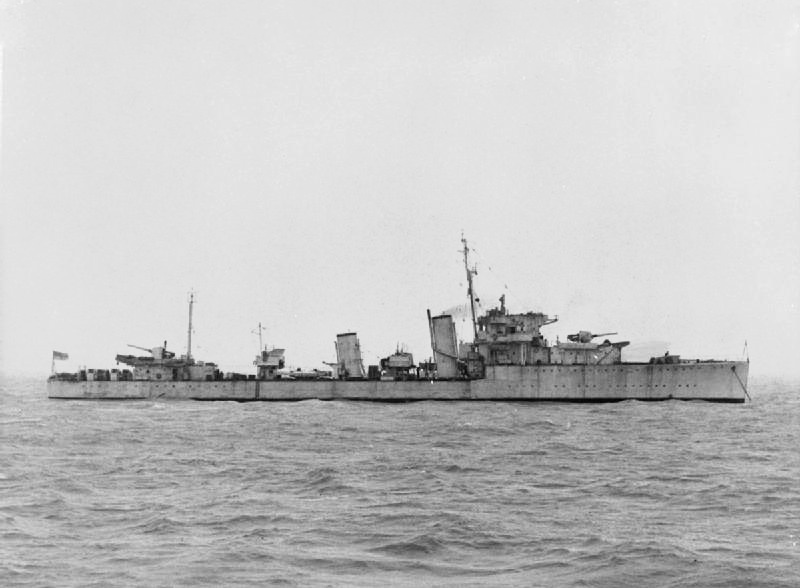
- Escapade at anchor, 12 February 1945. The censor has whited-out her pennant number and the Squid mounts.

History

United Kingdom
- Name: Escapade
- Ordered: 1 November 1932
- Builder: Scotts Shipbuilding and Engineering Company, Greenock
- Cost: £249,987
- Laid down: 30 March 1933
- Launched: 30 January 1934
- Completed: 30 August 1934
- Out of service: 3 December 1946
- Identification: Pennant number: H17
- Motto: Celeriter ("Swiftly")
- Honours and awards: Atlantic 1939–45; Norway 1940; Arctic 1941–42; Malta Convoys 1942; North Africa 1942
- Fate: Sold for scrap, 17 May 1947
- Badge: On a Field Green a white Horse, saltant

General characteristics
- Class & type: E-class destroyer
- Displacement: 1,405 long tons (1,428 t) (standard); 1,940 long tons (1,970 t) (deep load)
- Length: 329 ft (100.3 m) o/a
- Beam: 33 ft 3 in (10.13 m)
- Draught: 12 ft 6 in (3.81 m) (deep)
- Installed power: 36,000 shp (26,800 kW); 3 × Admiralty 3-drum boilers
- Propulsion: 2 × shafts; 2 × geared steam turbines
- Speed: 35.5 knots (65.7 km/h; 40.9 mph)
- Range: 6,350 nmi (11,760 km; 7,310 mi) at 15 knots (28 km/h; 17 mph)
- Complement: 145
- Sensors & processing systems: ASDIC
- Armament: 4 × single 4.7 in (120 mm) guns; 2 × quadruple 0.5 in (12.7 mm) machine guns; 2 × quadruple 21 in (533 mm) torpedo tubes; 20 × depth charges, 1 rack and 2 throwers

HMS Escapade was an E-class destroyer built for the Royal Navy in the early 1930s. Although assigned to the Home Fleet upon completion in 1934, the ship was attached to the Mediterranean Fleet in 1935–1936 during the Abyssinia Crisis. During the Spanish Civil War of 1936–1939 she spent considerable time in Spanish waters, enforcing the arms blockade imposed by Britain and France on both sides of the conflict. Escapade was assigned to convoy escort and anti-submarine patrol duties in the Western Approaches when World War II began in September 1939, but transferred back to the Home Fleet at the end of the year.

After participating in the Norwegian Campaign in early 1940, she participated in anti-invasion duty and escorted capital ships to Gibraltar and in Operation Menace. The destroyer returned to the British Isles for continued escort duty, punctuated by Operation Rubble and the hunt for Scharnhorst and Gneisenau in early 1941. Following a midyear refit she escorted Arctic convoys and a convoy to Malta, then went into another refit in mid-1942 before returning to the Atlantic from late 1942 to early 1943. After a refit, she returned to duty in the Atlantic later that year, but was sidelined for more than a year when a projectile from her Hedgehog anti-submarine weapon exploded, causing significant damage. Following her return to duty at the end of 1944, she escorted convoys in the last months of the war, then was used for training before being sold for scrap in 1947.

== Description ==
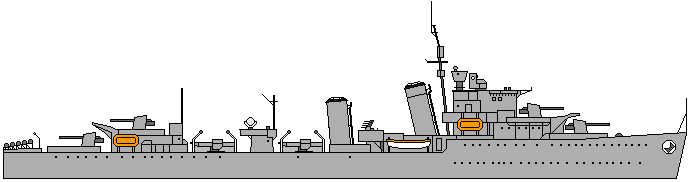
Profile of an E-class destroyer

The E-class ships were slightly improved versions of the preceding D class. They displaced 1,405 long tons (1,428 t) at standard load and 1,940 long tons (1,970 t) at deep load. The ships had an overall length of 329 feet (100.3 m), a beam of 33 feet 3 inches (10.1 m) and a draught of 12 feet 6 inches (3.8 m). They were powered by two Parsons geared steam turbines, each driving one propeller shaft, using steam provided by three Admiralty three-drum boilers. The turbines developed a total of 36,000 shaft horsepower (26,800 kW) and gave a maximum speed of 35.5 knots (65.7 km/h; 40.9 mph). Escapade carried a maximum of 470 long tons (480 t) of fuel oil that gave her a range of 6,350 nautical miles (11,760 km; 7,310 mi) at 15 knots (28 km/h; 17 mph). The ships' complement was 145 officers and ratings.

The ships mounted four 4.7-inch (120 mm) Mark IX guns in single mounts, designated 'A', 'B', 'X' and 'Y' from front to rear. For anti-aircraft (AA) defence, they had two quadruple mounts for the Vickers 0.5 in (12.7 mm) AA machinegun. The E class was fitted with two above-water quadruple torpedo tube mounts for 21-inch (533 mm) torpedoes. One depth charge rack and two throwers were fitted; 20 depth charges were originally carried, but this increased to 35 shortly after the war began.

=== Wartime modifications ===
Escapade had her rear torpedo tubes replaced by a 12-pounder (76 mm) AA gun by April 1941. In June–September 1943, she was converted into an escort destroyer. A Type 286 short-range surface-search radar was fitted and a Type 271 target indication radar was installed above the bridge, replacing the director-control tower and rangefinder. Her short-range AA armament was augmented by four 20 mm (0.8 in) Oerlikon guns and the .50-calibre machine guns were replaced by a pair of Oerlikons. A split Hedgehog anti-submarine spigot mortar was installed abreast 'B' gun and stowage for a total of 70 depth charges meant that 'Y' gun and the 12-pounder had to be removed to compensate for their weight.

After the accident that destroyed her Hedgehog mount in September 1943, the ship required extensive repairs and the navy took the opportunity to install two new Squid anti-submarine mortars in lieu of 'A' gun. The ship also received a HF/DF radio direction finder mounted on a pole mainmast. A Type 277 radar replaced the Type 271 and the Type 286 was superseded by a Type 291 radar.

== Construction and career ==
Escapade, the only ship of that name to serve with the Royal Navy, was ordered 1 November 1932, from Scotts Shipbuilding and Engineering Company under the 1931 Naval Programme. She was laid down on 30 March 1932 at their Greenock dockyard, and launched on 30 January 1934. The ship was commissioned on 30 August 1934, at a total cost of £249,987, excluding government-furnished equipment such as the armament. Escapade and her sister ships were assigned to the 5th Destroyer Flotilla (DF) and accompanied the Home Fleet during its West Indies cruise between January and March 1935. She collided with her sister Encounter off Portland on 18 June, but was only lightly damaged. The ship was attached to the Mediterranean Fleet, together with most of the rest of her flotilla, beginning in September 1935. Her deployment was a result of the Abyssinian Crisis, after which she returned home with the rest of her sisters in March 1936. The flotilla patrolled Spanish waters during the Spanish Civil War, enforcing the edicts of the Non-Intervention Committee, Escapade being detached for this duty five times between January 1937 and March 1939. She was struck by one of her sisters, Eclipse, on 18 January when her engines broke down and Eclipse could not manoeuvre clear in time; repairs took 17 days to complete. The ship was placed in reserve on 16 June at Devonport, but was recommissioned on 2 August to participate in the Reserve Fleet Review three days later.

In September 1939 she was allocated to the 12th Destroyer Flotilla, with which she served on escort and patrol duties. Escapade unsuccessfully attacked single U-boats in the English Channel on 5 November and 15 November, rescuing survivors from the torpedoed SS Navasota on 5 December. Escorting convoy HN14 to Norway on 25 February 1940, she spotted the surfaced U-63, but the submarine dived as Escapade approached, after which she made a depth charge attack. The depth charges dropped by her and the other three destroyers of the escort damaged the U-boat and forced her to surface, where the submarine was sunk by gunfire from the other three destroyers, as Escapade was out of position. Despite having made the first attack, her crew was not credited with the sinking.

The destroyer served in the Norwegian Campaign from 7 April, when she left Scapa Flow with the fleet in response to the sighting of the German invasion force in Heligoland Bight for what was erroneously thought to be a break-out into the Atlantic. The Home Fleet came under repeated air attack on 10 April, but Escapade was unscathed. The destroyer returned to Scapa Flow after the sortie and screened the light cruiser Southampton as the latter departed Scapa Flow alongside her sister ship Electra on 12 April. She was detached to protect troopships landing at Harstad on 15 and 16 April, and remained there for the rest of the month and much of May, escorting empty transports into the North Sea, pursuing U-boat sightings, and transporting orders and personnel between the landing sites. After screening the last evacuation convoys out of Norway in early June, the destroyer was sent to escort the aircraft carrier Ark Royal to join Force H at Gibraltar from 17 June. To guard against a German invasion of the British Isles, Escapade returned to that area with the 3rd Destroyer Flotilla in August, but was detached after three weeks to escort the battleship Barham in Operation Menace, the failed attempt to capture the West African port of Dakar from Vichy France.

=== 1941–1947 ===
Returning to the British Isles after the end of Operation Menace in late September, Escapade served as an escort for the next eight months, participating in the January 1941 Operation Rubble, the escape of Norwegian merchant ships from Sweden to England. In the next month, the destroyer escorted the battleship Nelson in the unsuccessful search for German battlecruisers Scharnhorst and Gneisenau, which had broken out in Operation Berlin to raid merchant shipping in the North Atlantic. Escapade was under refit on the River Tyne between 27 May and 10 July after escorting Convoy HX125. The destroyer then rejoined the 4th Destroyer Flotilla of the Home Fleet, forming part of the escort for the battleship HMS Prince of Wales in August, which was transporting Prime Minister Winston Churchill to the Atlantic Charter conference in Newfoundland.

Returning from this mission, she escorted the aircraft carriers HMS Victorious and Furious as they attacked the Axis-occupied ports of Petsamo, Finland, and Kirkenes, Norway, in Operation EF. Upon her return, Escapade was assigned to protect the Arctic convoys to Arkhangelsk in the Soviet Union, arriving at the latter with Operation Dervish, the first convoy, on 31 August. She continued this task, covering Convoys PQ 1, PQ 6 and QP 4, until beginning a refit at Immingham on 9 February that lasted until 20 March 1942. After escorting the Norwegian tanker Lind into Methil after the latter broke out from Sweden in April, Escapade escorted the capital ships covering Convoys PQ 14 and PQ 15 later that month. The ship then covered the May attempt to transfer the damaged light cruiser Trinidad from Murmansk to Iceland, which ended with the scuttling of the latter due to bomb damage. She then escorted Convoy QP 12 back from Kola Bay without incident.

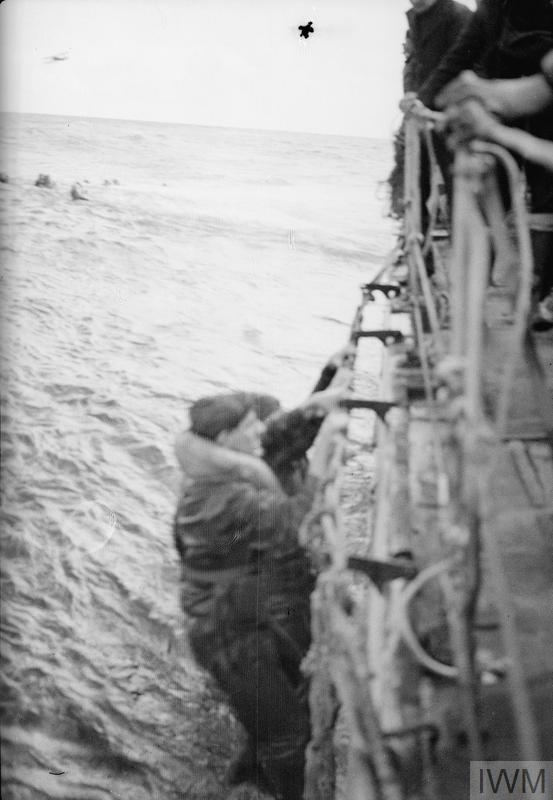
Survivors of a sunken U-boat clambering aboard Escapade in May 1943

Rejoining the 5th Destroyer Flotilla on 5 June, the destroyer escorted Convoy WS19Z to Malta in Operation Harpoon, then did the same for the aircraft carrier HMS Argus for the return journey. After helping to cover Convoy PQ 17 to the Soviet Union, the destroyer was refitted at Liverpool from 20 July to 24 September. Following the completion of the refit, she escorted the aircraft carrier HMS Furious to Gibraltar, arriving on 25 October. After again escorting Convoys KMF1 and KMF2 for Operation Torch, she returned to Greenock on 19 November with Convoy MKF1(X). Escapade was repaired on the Thames between 27 November and 23 December, joining Escort Group B3 of the Western Approaches Command for convoy escort duty in the North Atlantic, on which she spent the next six months. This period included escort duty with Convoys HX 228, ONS 175, HX 232, and HX 239 during the defeat of the U-boat campaign in May 1943.

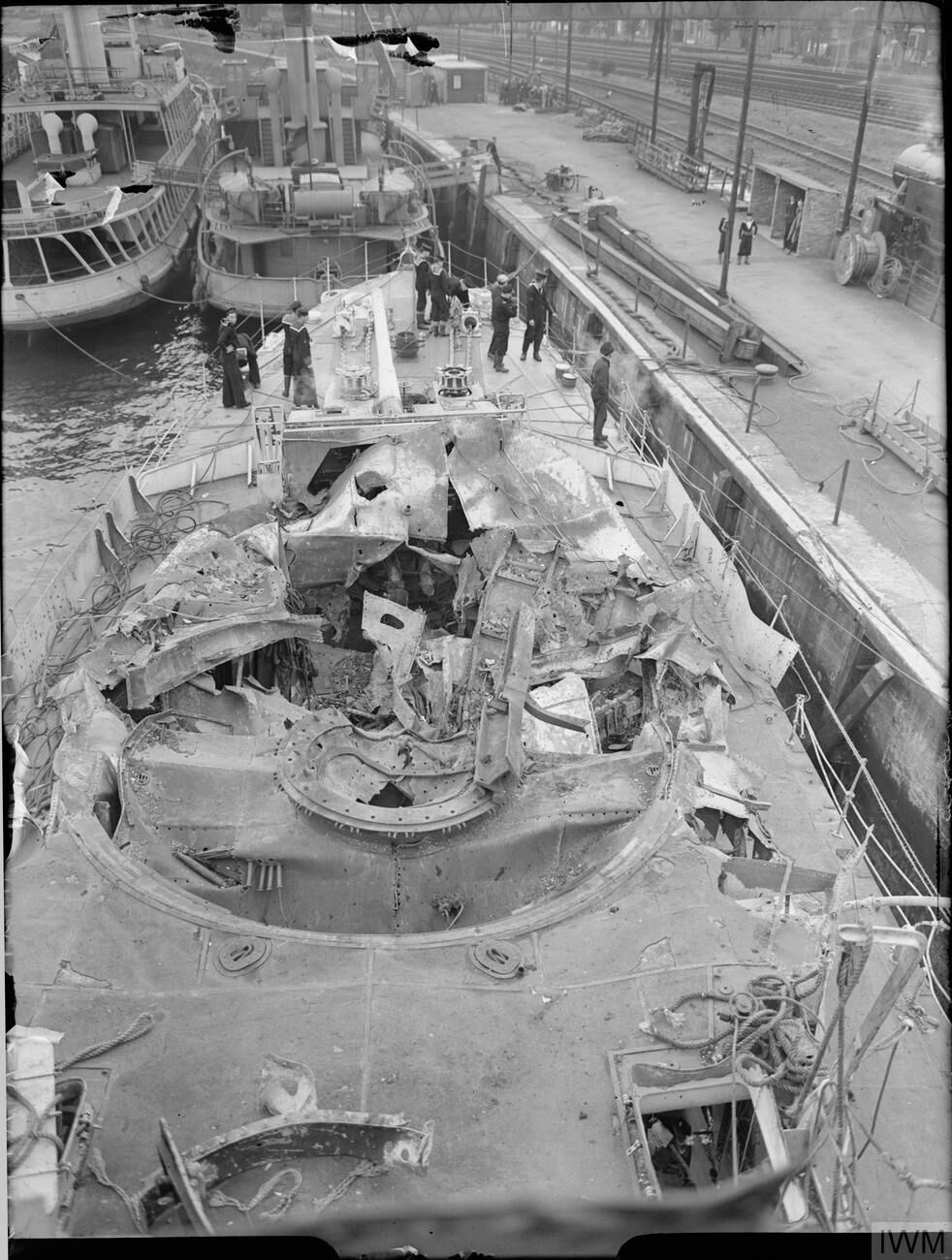
Damage to Escapade from the explosion of a Hedgehog projectile, 1943

Receiving the Hedgehog anti-submarine mortar during a refit at Cardiff between 3 June and 5 September, Escapade began escorting Convoy ONS 18 after a brief working up. While engaged in this duty off Northern Ireland on 20 September 1943, she fired her Hedgehog at a submarine contact, but one of its projectiles prematurely exploded, killing fifteen ratings, and wounding ten others, one mortally, in addition to destroying 'B' gun, the Hedgehog and heavily damaging the bridge and wheelhouse. It took more than a year to repair Escapade, which returned to duty on 30 December 1944.

She trialled the Squid anti-submarine mortar while serving with the 8th Escort Group in the last months of the war, and escorted Norwegian personnel to their home country in May 1945. The destroyer briefly served with the Anti-Submarine Training Flotilla, and was approved for scrapping on 18 February 1946. She was accordingly ordered stripped of equipment on 15 November and paid off as tender to HMS Tartar on 3 December. Handed over to the British Iron & Steel Corporation for scrapping on 17 May, she was broken up at Grangemouth, Scotland, by G.W. Brunton beginning on 3 August.

== Bibliography ==
- Colledge, J. J.; Warlow, Ben (2006) [1969]. Ships of the Royal Navy: The Complete Record of All Fighting Ships of the Royal Navy from the 15th Century to the Present (3rd Rev ed.). London: Chatham Publishing. ISBN 978-1-86176-281-8. OCLC 67375475.
- English, John (1993). Amazon to Ivanhoe: British Standard Destroyers of the 1930s. Kendal, England: World Ship Society. ISBN 0-905617-64-9.
- Friedman, Norman (2009). British Destroyers From Earliest Days to the Second World War. Annapolis, Maryland: Naval Institute Press. ISBN 978-1-59114-081-8.
- Haarr, Geirr H. (2010). The Battle for Norway: April–June 1940. Annapolis, Maryland: Naval Institute Press. ISBN 978-1-59114-051-1.
- Haarr, Geirr H. (2013). The Gathering Storm: The Naval War in Northern Europe September 1939 – April 1940. Annapolis, Maryland: Naval Institute Press. ISBN 978-1-59114-331-4.
- Haarr, Geirr H. (2009). The German Invasion of Norway, April 1940. Annapolis, Maryland: Naval Institute Press. ISBN 978-1-59114-310-9.
- Lenton, H. T. (1998). British & Empire Warships of the Second World War. Annapolis, Maryland: Naval Institute Press. ISBN 1-55750-048-7.
- Rohwer, Jürgen (2005). Chronology of the War at Sea 1939–1945: The Naval History of World War Two (Third Revised ed.). Annapolis, Maryland: Naval Institute Press. ISBN 1-59114-119-2.
- Whitley, M. J. (1988). Destroyers of World War Two: An International Encyclopedia. Annapolis, Maryland: Naval Institute Press. ISBN 0-87021-326-1.
