= HMS Eclipse =

Eight ships of Britain's Royal Navy have been named HMS Eclipse:

- HMS Eclipse (1797), a 12-gun, 169-ton gunboat launched at Blackwall on 29 March 1797. She was offered for sale in August 1802, and was sold in October.
- HMS Eclipse (1804), a 4-gun Vesuve-class French brig originally called Volage, and then Venteux, that the Royal Navy captured in 1803 and initially named HMS Eagle until it renamed her in 1804. It sold her in April 1807.
- HMS Eclipse (1807) an 18-gun Cruizer-class brig-sloop launched at Dover on 4 August 1807 and sold on 31 August 1815. She traded with India until 1823. Then between 1823 and 1845 she made seven voyages as a whaler.
- HMS Eclipse (1819), a 10-gun Cherokee-class brig-sloop that for a time became a Post Office Packet Service packet, sailing out of Falmouth, Cornwall. She was sold on 10 November 1863.
- HMS Eclipse (1860), a 700-ton wooden screw sloop launched at Millwall on 18 September 1860 and broken up in July 1867.
- HMS Eclipse (1867), a 1,267-ton Eclipse-class wooden screw sloop originally named Sappho but renamed before her launch at Sheerness on 14 November 1867. Converted to store ship by 1888 and sold in 1921.
- HMS Eclipse, the lead ship of her class of cruisers. Launched at Portsmouth on 19 July 1894 and sold in August 1921.
- HMS Eclipse, an E-class destroyer launched at Denny on 12 April 1934 and sunk by a mine in the Aegean Sea on 24 October 1943.
