= Operation Rösselsprung (1942) =

Attempt by German Navy to intercept convoy from UK to Soviet Union

Unternehmen Rösselsprung (1942)
- Part of Arctic naval operations of World War II
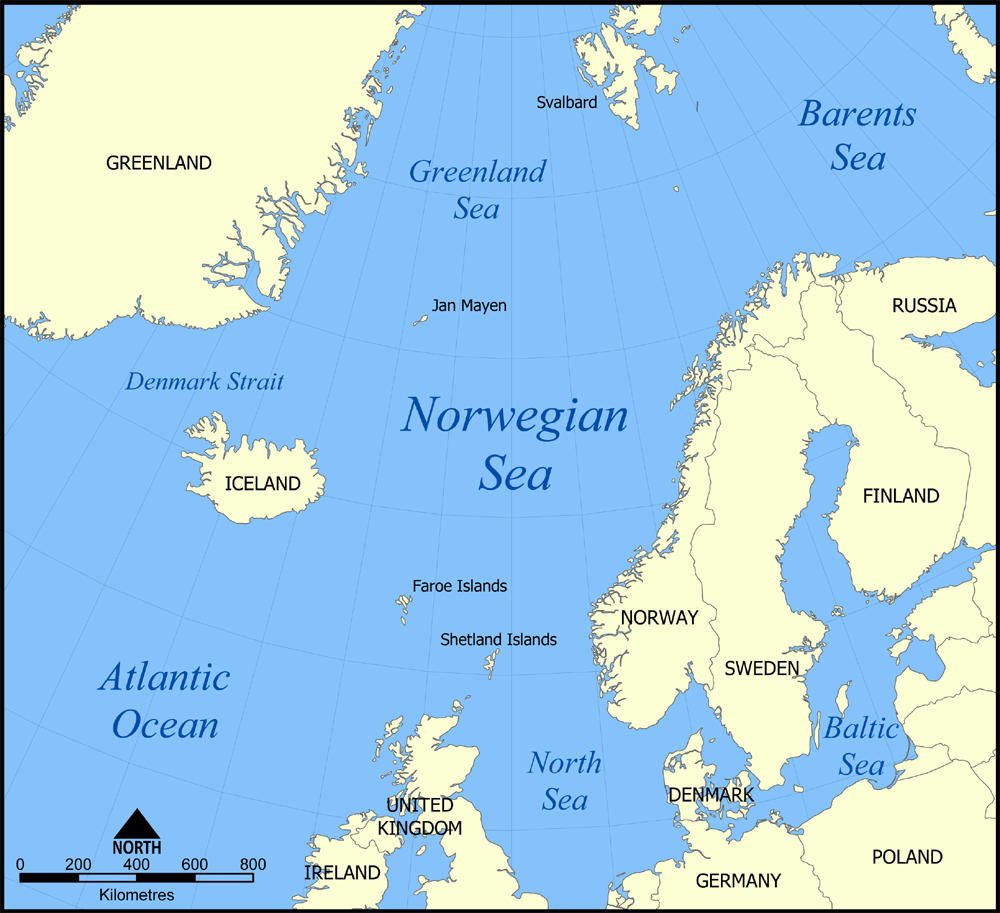
- Map of the Norwegian Sea
- Type: Naval operation
- Location: The Barents Sea
- Commanded by: Erich Raeder
- Objective: Destruction of Convoy PQ 17
- Date: 5 July 1942; 11:00 a.m. – 9:32 p.m.
- Executed by: Kriegsmarine
- Outcome: Cancelled
- Casualties: Nil

Unternehmen Rösselsprung (Operation Knight's Move) was a plan for an attack on Convoy PQ 17, the next Arctic Convoy to the northern Soviet Union. The big ships of the Kriegsmarine (German Navy) were to join the combined arms operations of Luftflotte 5 (Air Fleet 5) and the U-bootwaffe (U-boat arm). It was to be the largest surface ship operation by the Kriegsmarine thus far.

British decoding of German wireless messages by the Government Code and Cypher School at Bletchley Park, that the ships had sailed, led the First Sea Lord, Admiral Dudley Pound, to order Convoy PQ 17 to scatter, a sensible tactic when under attack by ships but 24 ships were sunk by U-boats and aircraft. The ships sailed at 11:00 a.m. on 5 July, but the operation was cancelled at 9:32 p.m. by the head of Oberkommando der Marine, Grand Admiral Erich Raeder, because the success of the aircraft and U-boats made a naval sortie unnecessary.

The heavy cruiser Lützow had grounded earlier in thick fog as did three of the destroyer escorts, Lützow needing three months of repairs. The success of the Luftwaffe and the U-boat arm left them jubilant but the anti-climax was a severe blow to the morale of the ship crews. Adolf Hitler was blamed for his reluctance to avoid defeats at sea. The Seekriegsleitung (Naval War Command) thought that the only alternative would be to revert to a policy of a fleet in being.

== Background ==
=== Hitler Directive 37 ===
On 10 October 1941, Hitler issued Directive 37, that required the Luftwaffe to protect northern Norway and Finland, defend Axis sea lanes and to attack Allied Arctic convoys. The Luftwaffe was also charged with the defence of the Petsamo nickel mines, conducting reconnaissance of areas where operations were to take place and to attack Murmansk and its rail connexions; preparations were to be made for the accommodation of reinforcements. The Kriegsmarine was to attack Arctic convoys and to protect Axis shipping in the Arctic as far as was possible. More ships were to operate from Norway and Kirkenes was to be made suitable as a forward base. More artillery was to be brought to Norway for coastal defence and co-operation between the army, navy and air force was to be enhanced, to protect against offensive action by the Allies on land and sea.

=== German intelligence ===
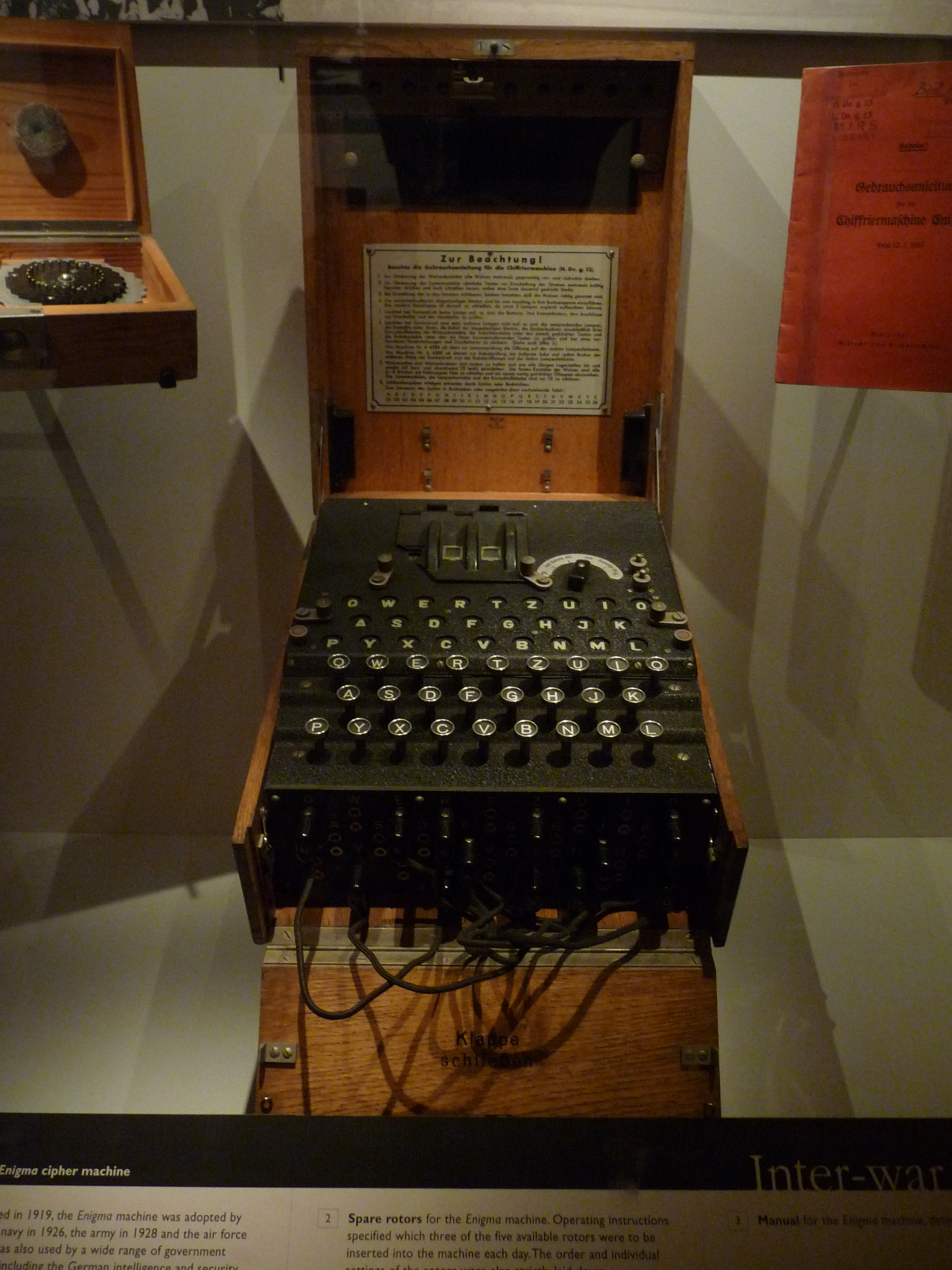
Photograph of an Enigma coding machine

The Beobachtungsdienst (Observation Service) was a Department of the German Naval Intelligence Service (Marinenachrichtendienst, MND III) of the Oberkommando der Marine (OKM) was the naval signals intelligence service that was reading much Allied naval signals traffic in 1942 but this did not give much insight into Arctic convoys. B-Dienst had broken Naval Cypher No. 3 in March and could also read the Merchant Navy Code just at the time when the German Shark cypher had cut off the British Government Code and Cypher School (GC&CS) at Bletchley Park from Atlantic U-boat transmissions. B-Dienst had a partial and intermittent view of Naval Cypher No. 4 with a considerable delay and this code would have been far more valuable for Arctic convoys. Abwehr, German military intelligence managed at times to get agents into Iceland but this was unreliable and prone to British penetration and deception operations. The Germans gained far more intelligence in the Arctic through air reconnaissance and U-boat observation.

=== Kriegsmarine ===
==== Command ====
The Kriegsmarine was beset by a complicated and overlapping command system. At Berlin, Grand Admiral Erich Raeder the Oberbefehlshaber der Kriegsmarine (Commander-in-Chief of the Navy) was head of OKM. At Sengwarden, near Wilhelmshaven, General Admiral Rolf Carls was Oberbefehlshaber des Marinegruppenkommandos Nord (Commander-in-chief, Northern Fleet Command [MGK Nord]). German naval forces in Norway were commanded from Oslo by Hermann Böhm, the Kommandierender Admiral Norwegen (Commanding Admiral Norway). Narvik was the headquarters of Vize-Admiral Oskar Kummetz the Befehlshaber der Kreuzer (Admiral Commanding cruisers) and Hubert Schmundt was the Admiral Eismeer (Admiral Arctic) commander of the U-boats. Vize-Admiral Otto Schniewind, the Flottenchef (Fleet Commander) was based at Trondheim in Tirpitz. On 8 June, SKL ruled on the command arrangements for operations. MGK Nord (Carls) had strategic command, with tactical command held by Schniewind, the Flottenchef (Fleet Commander). Schmundt, the Admiral Eismeer and commander of the U-boats, had strategic command of the Narvik group, tactical command being held by Vize-Admiral Kummetz.

The "fractured and hierarchical" (Boyd 2024) naval command system was mirrored by the Luftwaffe command structure and liaison between the two services led SKL to express doubt that the communications between MGK Nord at Wilhelmshaven and Luftflotte 5 at Oslo were effective. MGK Nord claimed that the system was adequate, even for an operation as complicated as Rösselsprung, when prompt transmission of information to the front-line commanders was vital. As well as internal communication between both forces being fractured and rigid, requests to Luftflotte 5 for air reconnaissance had to go to MGK Nord, thence to Luftflotte 5 headquarters at Oslo and replies back by the same route. The wireless and land lines between Wilhemshaven and Oslo were of dubious quality and links to the Arctic and northern Norway suffered because of geography and changeable atmospheric conditions. The reluctance of Luftflotte 5 to divert aircraft from attack to reconnaissance added to the ordinary difficulties in communication.

==== U-boats ====
Two U-boats were based in Norway in July 1941, four in September, five in December and two in January 1942, seven in February, nine in March and one in April, 23 boats in all, a number maintained for the rest of the year. Hitler contemplated establishing a unified command but decided against it. The German battleship Tirpitz arrived at Trondheim on 16 January, the first ship of a general move of surface ships to Norway. British convoys to Russia had received little attention in 1941, since they averaged only eight ships each and the long Arctic winter nights negated even the limited Luftwaffe reconnaissance effort that was available.

==== Ships ====
Kriegsmarine in red, Luftwaffe in blue, North Cape in green

On 23 February, the cruisers Prinz Eugen and Admiral Scheer joined Tirpitz at Trondheim, that had arrived on 16 January, followed on 21 March by the cruiser Admiral Hipper and on 26 May by Lutzow. The transfer of more U-boats to Norway in 1942 along with the ships allowed the Kriegsmarine to contemplate more ambitious operations against Arctic convoys. In May, despite the increased number of aircraft available to Luftflotte 5, Marine Gruppe Kommando Nord (MGK Nord) was sceptical of the ability to find the British distant escorts, despite the better weather at this time of year, because of the area of sea to be covered. Knowledge of the British dispositions was necessary if the big German ships were to be risked against a convoy.

==== Altafjord ====
Altafjord was a safe anchorage for big ships about 24 nmi × 5 nmi (44.4 km × 9.3 km; 27.6 mi × 5.8 mi) inside a circle of mountains and with islands at the mouth, with several routes out of the fjord. Fighters were close by at Banak and Kirkenes. The fjord was about 180 nmi (330 km; 210 mi) to the north-east of Narvik and about 100 nmi (190 km; 120 mi) to the south-west of the North Cape. Altafjord faced north, was closer to the Arctic route than Narvik, where the exit was to the south-west and it was nearly on the same line of longitude as Bjørnøya (Bear Island) making it a good jumping-off point for attacks to the east of the line. In March 1942, MGK Nord had sent orders for the construction of berthing facilities for two big ships and a destroyer flotilla. Otto Ciliax the Commander, Battleships (Befehlshaber der Schlachtschiffe) had begun discussions at the end of May between the staffs of MGK Nord, Befehlshaber der Schlachtschiffe and Admirial Eismeer about the use of Altafjord as an advanced base for big ship attacks against Arctic convoys.

=== Luftflotte 5 ===
==== 1941 ====
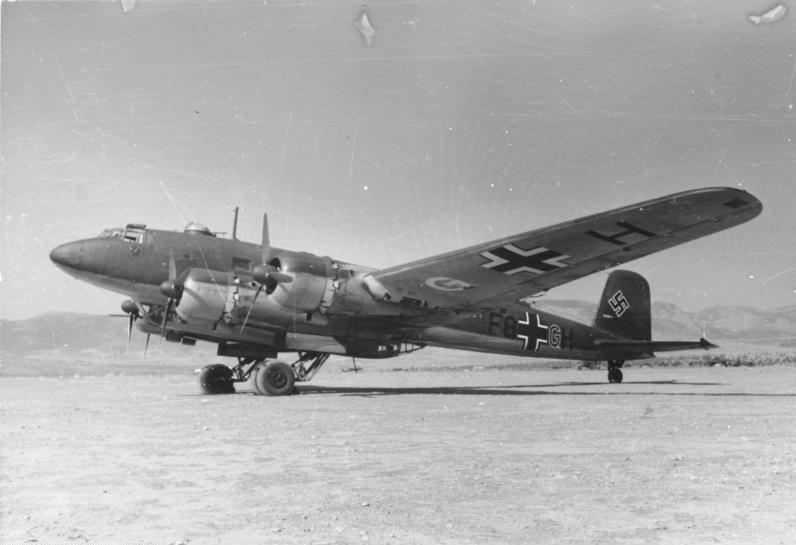
A Fw 200 Kondor of KG 40

In mid-1941, Luftflotte 5 (Air Fleet 5) had been re-organised for Operation Barbarossa with Luftgau Norwegen (Air Region Norway) headquartered in Oslo. Fliegerführer Stavanger (Air Commander Stavanger) the centre and north of Norway, Jagdfliegerführer Norwegen (Fighter Leader Norway) commanded the fighter force and Fliegerführer Kerkenes (Oberst [colonel] Andreas Nielsen) in the far north had airfields at Kirkenes and Banak. The Air Fleet had 180 aircraft, sixty of which were reserved for operations on the Karelian Front against the Red Army.

The distance from Banak to Arkhangelsk was 560 mi (900 km) and Fliegerführer Kerkenes had only ten Junkers Ju 88 bombers of Kampfgeschwader 30, thirty Junkers Ju 87 Stuka dive-bombers, ten Messerschmitt Bf 109 fighters of Jagdgeschwader 77, five Messerschmitt Bf 110 heavy fighters of Zerstörergeschwader 76, ten reconnaissance aircraft and an anti-aircraft battalion. Sixty aircraft were far from adequate in such a climate and terrain where

...there is no favourable season for operations. (Earl Ziemke [1959] in Claasen [2001])

==== 1942 ====
The emphasis of air operations changed from army support to anti-shipping operations after March 1942, when Allied Arctic convoys were becoming larger, more frequent and coincided with the German reinforcement of Norway with ships and aircraft, in the less extreme weather conditions of the Arctic summer. At the end of March the Luftflotte had been re-organised into three tactical units, Fliegerführer Nord (Ost) (Colonel Hermann Busch) at Kirkenes, Fliegerführer Lofotens (Colonel Hans Roth) at Bardufoss and Fliegerführer Nord (West) (Colonel Alexander Holle) at Sola. Fliegerführer Nord (Ost) held the bulk of the front-line aircraft and responsibility for attacks on land and sea targets. Fliegerführer Nord (Ost) also had responsibility for attacks on Murmansk and Arkhangelsk, when circumstances allowed.

Fliegerführer Lofotens had no front-line formations under his command, they were to be transferred to his control as the tactical situation made it convenient; in March the Fliegerführer had two coastal reconnaissance squadrons, 3./Küstenfliegergruppe 906 at Trondheim and 1./Küstenfliegergruppe 123 at Tromsø. Fliegerführer Nord (West) had responsibility for reconnaissance and operations against convoys south of a notional line between Trondheim westwards the Shetland Isles and Iceland with a Staffel of I./Aufklärungsgruppe (F) 22, eight Kondors of I./Kampfgeschwader 40 that had transferred from Bordeaux and 1. and 2. Staffeln of Küstenfliegergruppe 406 (1./Kü.Fl.Gr. 406 and 2./Kü.Fl.Gr. 406) plus a weather reconnaissance Staffel.

The Luftflotte strength had increased to 150 front line aircraft in January 1942 and 225 in February, with the transfer of a Kampfgeschwader and a Jagdgeschwader from the Netherlands. Luftflotte 5 now had sixty long-range bombers, thirty dive-bombers, 45 fighters and twenty long-range reconnaissance aircraft, with serviceability around 60 per cent. The Seeluftstreitkräfte of the Kriegsmarine had about 15 Heinkel He 115 seaplanes capable of torpedo-bombing and a Staffel of Blohm & Voss BV 138 flying boats. Towards the end of April, the Luftwaffe torpedo-bombers began to arrive, about half Junkers Ju 88s and half Heinkel He 111s, that had their first success against Convoy PQ 15 on 3 May; by July, the number of torpedo-bombers had risen to 77.

=== German planning ===
German thinking about attacks on Arctic convoys was influenced by the limited effect of the U-boats in the Arctic. The Befehlshaber der U-Boote (BdU) Karl Dönitz, condemned the performance of the U-boats against Convoy PQ 16 and the declining opportunities for U-boat operations in the Arctic summer. The changeableness of the weather and visibility, unusually powerful escort forces and the intervention of the Soviet air force had forced U-boats to dive at the sight of any aircraft. The shadowing of convoys and the determined attacks by six U-boats against Convoy PQ 16, had sunk one ship and were credited with four probable torpedo hits (actually none). In return the British had damaged five boats with depth charges that would take much time to repair, making worse the lack of facilities in Norway and Germany. If the U-boat effort was maintained, at least half of the Arctic U-boats would be out of action. SKL considered the vital importance of attacks on Arctic convoys meant that at least eight U-boats attack each convoy, despite the adverse tactical conditions and that even occasional sinkings justified the cost to the Atlantic campaign. In May another three U-boats were sent to the Arctic, making 22. Attacks on the reciprocal QP convoys were to stop to save effort, unless it affected the attack on PQ convoys. (Note: On 29 May there were 20 U-boats in the Mediterranean, 20 in the Arctic and 56 in the Atlantic; half of the Atlantic boats were sailing to and from the operational area, leaving only 22 in action off the US coast and the South Atlantic, six boats were attacking convoys in the North Atlantic.)

The role of the Commander, battleships (Befehlshaber der Schlachtschiffe) was abolished due to the illness of Otto Ciliax; his staff was taken over by Admiral Otto Schniewind the Flottenchef (Fleet Commander) and a new post, the Admiral Commanding Cruisers (Befehlshaber der Kreuzer) created for Admiral Oskar Kummetz who took command of the heavy cruisers and destroyers at Narvik. Schniewind retained command of Tirpitz and Admiral Hipper at Trondheim. At the end of May, MGK Nord continued to harbour doubts that air reconnaissance could find the big ships of the Home Fleet, even in good weather, because as the polar ice melted, the area to be searched grew too big. Finding the Home Fleet was the only condition in which the big ships at Narvik could sail, since it was vital that they only have to deal with the smaller convoy escorts. It remained possible that the convoy escorts and the cruiser cover might hold off an attack on the merchant ships, wasting the oil used in the operation and risking damage that could take months to repair. Reinforcement by the ships at Trondheim was the logical corollary.

In June, the view of Carls and MGK Nord had evolved, Schniewind emphasising that with Case Blue, the second summer offensive in the Soviet Union due, the western Allies would make a maximum effort to deliver war materials to the Russians. The navy must make an equally determined riposte against the next convoy and that the near permanent daylight and fairly clear weather was the best time for such a demonstration. The chronic fuel shortage had eased with the delivery of 15,000 long tons (15,000 t) of fuel oil and there were more destroyers and torpedo boats in Norway. Schniewind wanted a mass attack by all the ships in Norway, with the possibility of the destruction of an Arctic convoy that would have a great effect on the war at sea. The operations section of SKL and Schmundt, the Admiral Eismeer, agreed and added to the feeling that the big ships should pull their weight in the war if they were to have a future. When the next convoy operation, the combined Convoy QP 13 was found, MGK Nord wanted the ships at Trondheim to transfer to Narvik, for a joint attack on Convoy PQ 17, as U-boats kept contact with the convoy to guide aircraft and ships to it.

The ships would rapidly approach the convoy, avoiding engagement with Allied ships except for the convoy close escort, that would be destroyed by Force I, Tirpitz and Hipper as Force II, Lützow, Hipper and its destroyer escorts attacked the merchant ships. Sinking ships would not be necessary, when they were disabled they would be easy targets for U-boats and the ships could make a prompt retreat to the coast. A success would justify the fuel expenditure and the risk from the Allied submarines that accompanied convoys was judged no worse than hits by destroyer torpedoes. SKL accepted the proposal and Hitler was briefed on 5 June, who allowed planning to continue but did not approve the plan. On 8 June the plan to attack the next convoy with all the big ships was approved by MGK Nord and SKL and called Unternehmen Rösselsprung (Knight's Move). MGK Nord noted that the Admiral Eismeer had been ordered to send three U-boats to the north-east of the Denmark Strait and the rest to the vicinity of Jan Mayen.

Negotiations had started with Luftflotte 5 for a maximum effort in reconnaissance. With the amount of sea to be searched, this would need some bombers to be diverted to reconnaissance but this fell afoul of Luftflotte 5 intransigence. The airmen claimed that the effort against Convoy PQ 16 showed that air attack was the most effective tactic against a convoy. Raeder showed the plan to Hitler on 15 June; the concentration of the ships at Altafiord was to be left to the last minute and the operation conducted at maximum speed, to deny the Home Fleet time to interfere. An engagement was intended only with the close escort and this would be assured by air reconnaissance to follow the convoy and observe the Home Fleet heavy cover. Raeder stressed the importance of air reconnaissance over air attacks on the convoy. Twelve destroyers were available for the operation with enough fuel, the better weather on the Arctic in June and the Polar ice still preventing a convoy diverting all that much further north away from Norway. Hitler agreed to the operation with the proviso that only he could authorise the sortie from Altafiord, when the British aircraft carriers had been found and attacked if they were a threat but Hitler refused to overrule the Luftwaffe and order reconnaissance sorties at the expense of air attacks on the convoy.

== Prelude ==
=== June ===
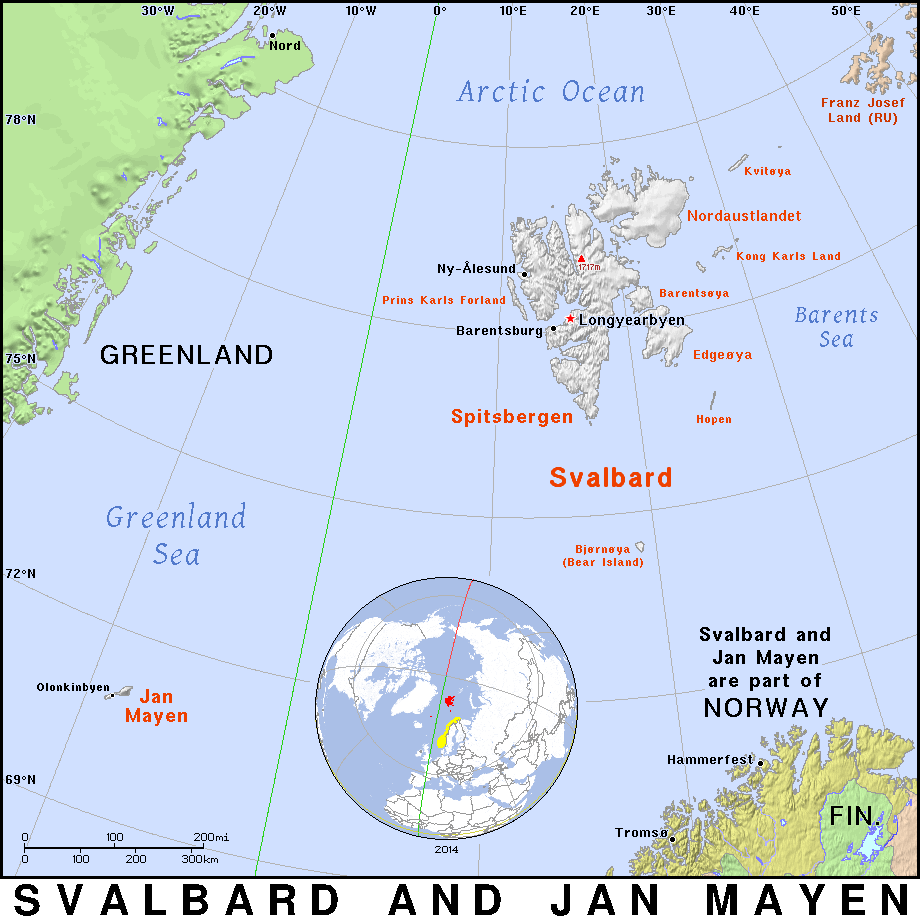
Chart showing Jan Mayen and Svalbard

On 11 June, gruppe Eisteufel (Ice Devil) was ordered by Schmundt, the Admiral Eismeer, to send U-251, U-376 and U-408 to the Denmark Strait, to track the next convoy rather than attack it and to attack warships only when they had been identified beyond doubt. U-334 sailed on 15 June and on the following day, U-657 and U-88 departed, U-457 sailed on 18 June and on 23 June, U-255 and U-456 began their voyages. U-703 and U-355 were also ordered to join the Wolfpack and wait for the convoy near Jan Mayen in the Norwegian Sea. The Home Fleet sailed east in mid-June, covering a diversionary convoy, Force X, part of Operation ES, simulating an invasion of southern Norway, that sailed two days after the departure of Convoy PQ 17 but went unseen by German air reconnaissance, as was a repeat performance a week later.

=== 30 June − 2 July ===
Luftflotte 5 had begun reconnaissance flights to find Convoy PQ 17 in mid-June but the first suggestion that it had sailed was a brief sighting of Convoy QP 13 on 30 June, 180 nmi (330 km; 210 mi) north-north-west of the North Cape before it was lost in bad weather. Another piece of information was the sighting of a naval force with a US battleship north-east of Iceland two days previous. Poor weather obstructed air reconnaissance between Iceland and Jan Mayen from 28 June to and 2 July. During the afternoon of 1 July, U-255 and U-406 reported sightings and the next morning, U-456 spotted the convoy. Air reconnaissance was able to report on 2 July that the convoy had about 37 ships and 16 escorts. More intermittent sightings of Convoy QP 13 and decrypts from B-Dienst showed that the convoys had crossed about half-way between Jan Mayen and Bear Island.

=== 3 July ===
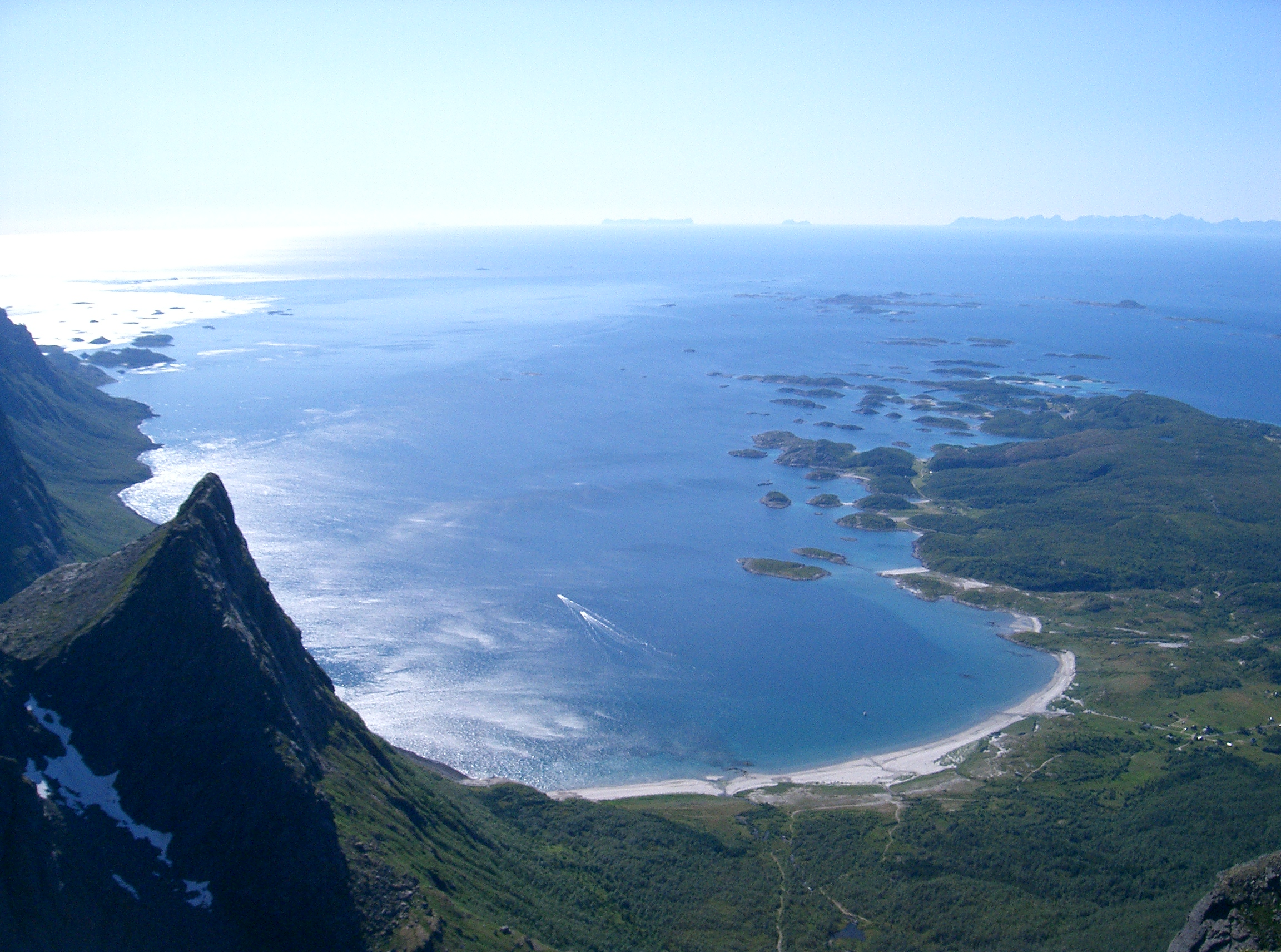
Vestfjord

The early U-boat sightings led to MGK Nord ordering Force I from Trondheim to the Gimsøya Strait in the Lofoten Isles and Force II from Narvik to Altafjord. (Note: The Gimsøya Strait was about 100 nmi (190 km; 120 mi) west of Bogen Bay in the south-western Lofoten Isles, between Vestfjorden and the sea.) SKL worried that the poor visibility was going to make the operation harder. Force I sailed from Trondheim at 8:00 p.m. and Force II from Narvik at 00:00 a.m., then Lützow grounded in fog near the Storbøen lighthouse, on passage through a narrow channel west of Bogen Bay between the Lofotens and the mainland, a route chosen to keep the ships away from British observation. Lützow was damaged severely enough to drop out of Rösselsprung and return to Bogen Bay. Admiral Scheer and the destroyers continued to Altafjord and arrived late in the afternoon. Soon after the German ships sailed, reconnaissance aircraft reported an aircraft carrier, two battleships, three cruisers and five destroyers about 150 nmi (280 km; 170 mi) to the south-east of Jan Mayen.

MGK Nord took this sighting to be the Home Fleet heavy cover. The British fleet was about 275 nmi (509 km; 316 mi) to the south-west of the convoy and no threat, provided that it did not turn east; if it did, MGK Nord planned to send the two forces to Altafjord and wait on developments. Four Fw 200 Kondors were sent to search between the north of Norway and Jan Mayen during the night of 3/4 July and found nothing. The search was in the wrong place as the ships had moved to the north-east, beyond the search area, to cover the convoy as it passed north of Bear Island. More sightings of a battleship and several cruisers by air reconnaissance and U-boats, during the afternoon of 3 July, were interpreted by MGK Nord and Schmundt as the cruiser covering force.

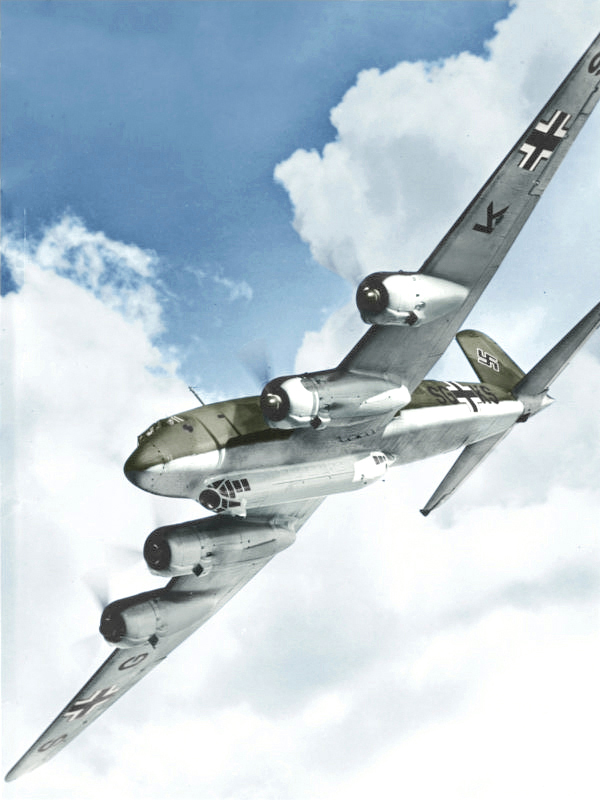
Example of a Focke-Wulf Fw 200 C Kondor (recoloured)

Contact with the convoy was gained and lost several times but the Germans kept up with its progress and B-Dienst reported its speed as 8 kn (15 km/h; 9.2 mph). At 4:00 p.m. the convoy was 60 nmi (110 km; 69 mi) west of Bear Island and MGK Nord ordered Force I, that had been at Vestfjord for two hours, should move on to Altafjord by the next morning rather than sail from the Gimsøya Strait. Concentrating the German ships at Altafjord would reduce the distance the two forces would have to cover once permission had been granted to go ahead. Force I set off at 5:00 p.m. but soon afterwards the destroyers Z10 Hans Lody, Z20 Karl Galster and Z6 Theodor Riedel of the five escorts scraped their bottoms in the Gimsøya Strait and had to turn back to Trondheim; with the accidental damage to Lützow the German force had been reduced by 25 per cent.

=== 3/4 July, night ===
During the night of 3/4 July, the SKL discussed the situation and expected that the British would soon find out about the ship movements and that the British might reverse the convoy, use the heavy cover to fight it through to Murmansk, reinforce the convoy escorts, use an aircraft carrier force to threaten the Lofotens and Altafjord or keep the heavy cover out of aircraft range and let the convoy escorts fight it out. The first two possibilities would negate the Kriegsmarine ship sortie at the cost of a delay to the convoy or risk it being damaged by aircraft and U-boats and the third possibility would put Force I and Force II at grave risk. Rösselsprung could only go ahead if the British followed the last possibility. If the ships seen near the convoy at 10:45 p.m. was certain to be heading west or had no battleship, the naval operation could begin later on 4 or 5 July. U-88, U-255 and U-456 tried to attack the convoy but were seen off by the escorts or lost sight of the convoy in the poor visibility.

== Operation ==
=== 4 July ===
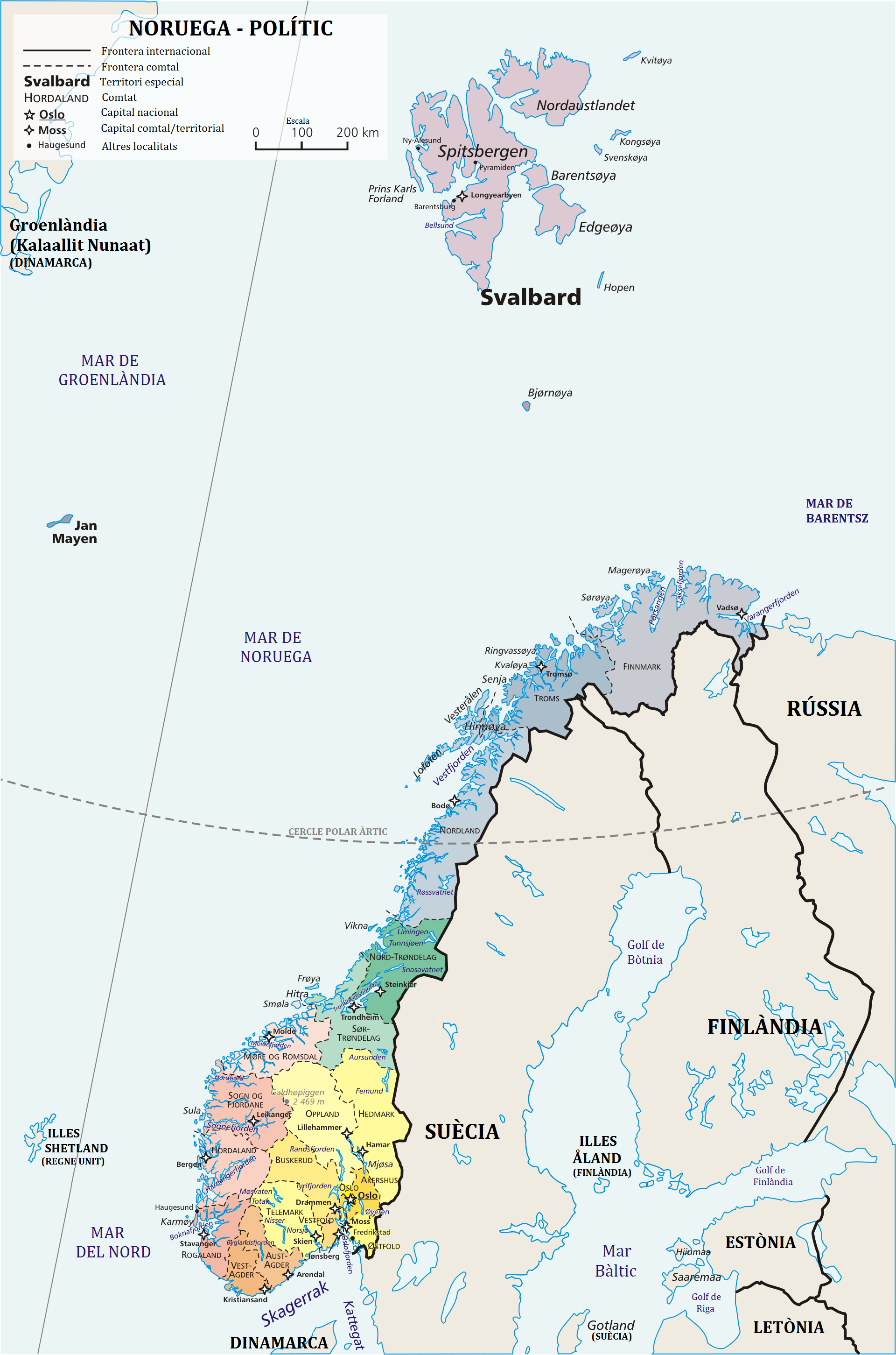
Map showing the Norwegian coast

The deterrent effect of the British cruiser cover affected the German commanders after 9:00 a.m. when Tirpitz and Hipper had reached Altafiord and there was alarm when two apparent British torpedo bombers were seen and an aircraft carrier was inferred to be nearby (these are thought to be Walrus amphibians from the cruisers). There was also worry that the withdrawal of Lützow and the three destroyers evened the odds with the British cruiser cover. Soon after noon, SKL told Hitler that the British ships made Rösselsprung impossible unless the aircraft and U-boats could inflict losses on them. Schmundt ordered the U-boats to make the British escorts their main target whenever they were found.

At 5:00 p.m. MGK Nord set a deadline of 5:00 p.m. on 5 July by when the operation must have begun or Force I be withdrawn to Narvik. During the evening the German naval flotilla was in Altafjord, waiting for the nature of the British cruiser force to be discovered, whether there was an aircraft carrier in the area and the whereabouts the Home Fleet heavy cover, with its aircraft carrier. At 9:30 p.m. another reconnaissance aircraft reported that the British cruiser cover included a battleship. MGK Nord took time to study U-boat and aircraft reports to conclude that Convoy PQ 17 had scattered and that the cruiser cover had turned back.

=== 5 July ===
By 6:00 a.m. MGK Nord and the other headquarters were sure that the convoy had dispersed, thought to have been caused by the air attacks during the previous evening but as the ships diverged the German reaction was one of bemusement. The British cruiser cover was reported by a U-boat at 1:10 a.m. steaming westwards at high speed out of the area. Carls asked for permission to begin Rösselsprung stressing that even though the position of the Home Fleet was not known, it could not join an operation 200 nmi (370 km; 230 mi) east of Bear Island and within range of Luftflotte 5. The deadline for the ships at Altafjord was 1:00 p.m. or the engagement would take place too close to the Soviet coast. Raeder refused the request and demanded that the position of the Home Fleet had to be certain. A sighting report of the "carrier force" 200 nmi (370 km; 230 mi) west of Bear Island was received at 6:55 a.m. allowed Carls to try again and added that having been at sea since 1 July it was doubtful if the British had enough fuel to sail eastwards. Air reconnaissance found no ships in the area from 75 nmi (139 km; 86 mi) west of Bear Island to 100 nmi (190 km; 120 mi) to the east all the way from the Norwegian coast to the Polar ice.

Raeder relented and got Hitler's approval by 11:40 a.m. Schniewind had begun the voyage from Altafjord at 11:00 a.m. and was briefed that the convoy had scattered, that only light escort forces were present and that the U-boats had been warned off. MGK Nord was sure that the British had not discovered the concentration of ships at Altafjord and predicted that the area of operations for 12:00 a.m. on 6 July would be roughly 120 nmi (220 km; 140 mi) west of the Matochkin Strait in the Barents Sea. The German force left Altafjord by 1:00 p.m. and set course to the north-east at 22 kn (41 km/h; 25 mph), SKL optimistic at its chances. At 4:10 p.m. a signal from Carls at MGK Nord added a note of caution, that a "short operation with partial success" was preferred to a "complete victory" that took longer. Schniewind was to report Allied aircraft at once and turn back at a serious threat; an Allied success against the ships was to be denied at all costs. By the evening B-Dienst reports had revealed that the force had been sighted near the North Cape at 5:00 p.m. by the Soviet submarine K-21 (that had fired two torpedoes to no effect) and again about an hour later by a Soviet aircraft.

The reports from B-Dienst alarmed MGK Nord and SKL in case the Home Fleet turned back, to cut off the German ships on their return. The staffs considered ignoring the risk and continuing the operation, adding a time limit to preclude interception or abandoning the sortie and leaving the U-boats and aircraft to finish off the convoy that they had been thought to have sunk twelve ships that day. Carls wanted to stop the sortie since with the ships no longer being a concentrated target the risks were not commensurate with the possibilities and that if the sortie was to continue, Hitler must give hi approval again. The SKL Operations Division dismissed the possibility of a British interception but Raeder agrees with Carls and at 9:32 p.m. MGK Nord cancelled the operation when the ships were 100 nmi (190 km; 120 mi) north of North Cape and 200 nmi (370 km; 230 mi) from the operational area. The sequel to the decision was "a chasm" opening between the Operations Division and the fleet against Raeder and Carls, especially when it was discovered that Raeder, rather than Hitler had given the order.

== Aftermath ==
Diagram showing the approximate positions of the ships sunk from Convoy PQ 17

In 1994, Richard Woodman wrote that the naval sortie was an anti-climax and almost as depressing to the German sailors as the British withdrawal had been to them. The ships had been attacked by a Soviet submarine, spotted by a British Catalina and reported by the British submarine Unshaken, leading to the German naval command getting "cold feet". Aircraft and U-boats were sinking so many ships that the naval flotilla seemed unnecessary. The recall was a severe blow to morale in the ships and at the headquarters, "They should have let us make one little attack". Another officer noted that the ships had been in Norway for six months and had suffered great frustration at the passage of Convoy PQ 16 already. Schniewind and Kummetz tried to get permission for another sortie, to no avail,

Every operation by our heavy forces had been hampered by the Führer's desire to avoid losses and reverses at all costs.

— Kapitän Wagner, Chief of Naval Operations

Woodman wrote that Rösselsprung "had been a damp squib" and the big ships went back to waiting.

In 2001, Werner Rahn wrote in the informal German official history "Germany and the Second World War" ("Das Deutsche Reich und der Zweite Weltkrieg") that at an important time in the war at sea, with the U-boat campaign in the Atlantic enjoying great success, OKM lacked the strength of purpose to use its forces in the Arctic, despite long and careful planning. Rahn wrote that instead of having a clear view of the condition of Convoy PQ 17 and implementing Unternehmung Rösselsprung, Raeder and MGK Nord were swayed by considerations of prestige. An objective view is that the operation should have continued. Hitler did not overrule his naval commanders they overruled themselves, for fear of Hitler if the operation failed. The headquarters staffs and ships' companies were deeply frustrated and returned to their anchorages "with their tails between their legs", only to find the Luftwaffe and the U-boat arm jubilant at their success.

SKL concluded that another attempt to use the big ships for an Arctic operation would suffer from Hitler

...wanting to avoid losses and setbacks at all costs. Such operations will therefore only be possible if they do not, as far as it is humanly possible to foresee, involve a significant risk, especially through the appearance of enemy carriers. This condition was fulfilled in the planning of Unternehmen Rösselsprung to a degree which had never yet been achieved, and probably will never be achieved again, with the PQ convoys.

The only thing that the Kriegsmarine could do was revert to a policy of a fleet in being, to limit British opportunities to use the Home Fleet elsewhere.

In 2024, Andrew Boyd wrote that in objective terms, the cancellation of Rösselsprung made sense but it caused lasting bitterness in the Kriegmarine. Raeder explained his decision by referring to the responsibility he owed to Hitler to avoid needless risks to what ships the Kriegmarine still had left. Behind his back, Carls was accused of playing politics and looking to supplant Raeder at the expense of the navy. If, according to the policy laid down by Hitler on 14 March, the fleet was not to be used against a convoy in such favourable circumstances, then when would it be used? Hindsight showed that German fears were excessive; when the force turned back, the Home Fleet had been heading south-west all day and was 500 nmi (930 km; 580 mi) west of Altafjord. Had the attack gone ahead, there would have been plenty of time to get the aircraft carrier HMS Victorious within 200 nmi (370 km; 230 mi) of the last part of the German return route. Fuel shortage amongst the British escorts was serious and the German force, close to the coast, would have more than one route to choose from, well within German fighter range and with the British ships in easy range of the Luftflotte 5 bombers, a far riskier prospect than the 9 March attack on Tirpitz during Operation Sportpalast against Convoy PQ 12 – Convoy QP 8.

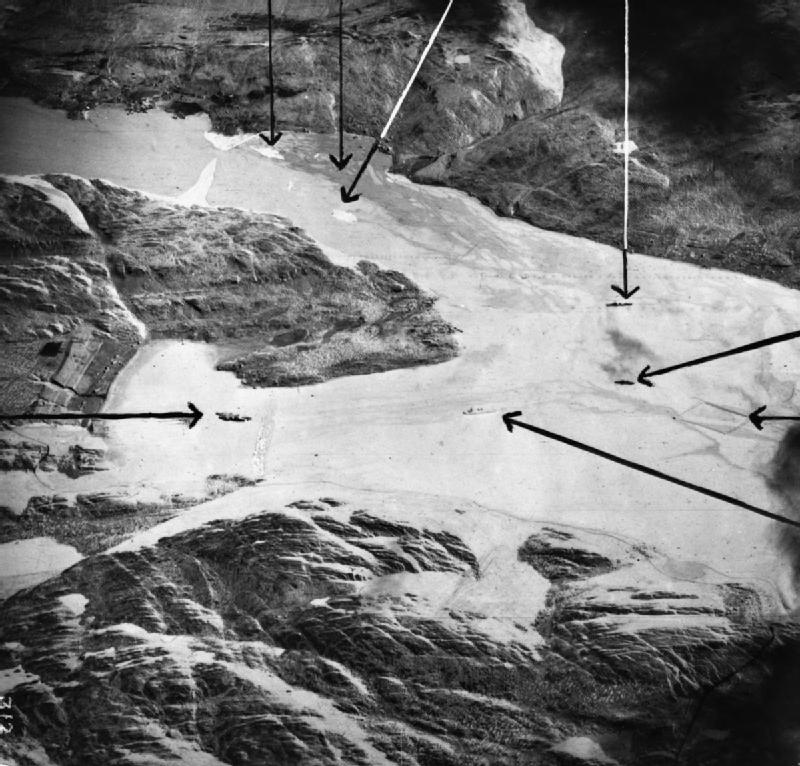
British aerial photograph of Altafjord, British official photographer (10 January 1942 to 12 November 1944)

Battleship Tirpitz

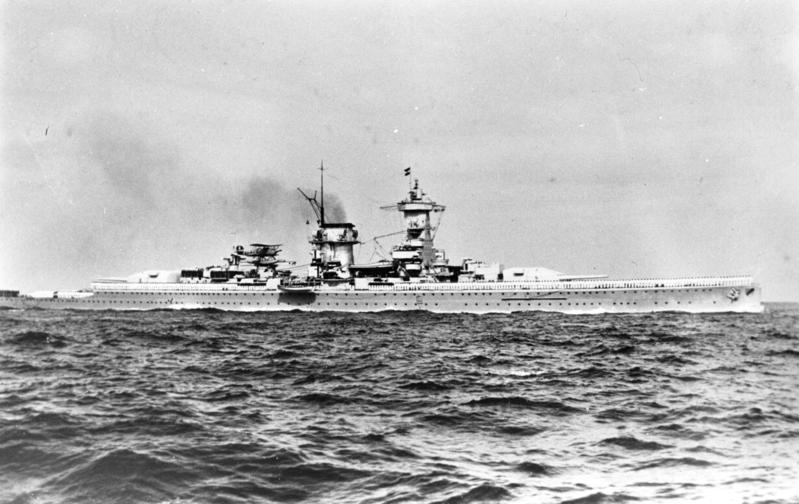
Heavy cruiser Admiral Scheer

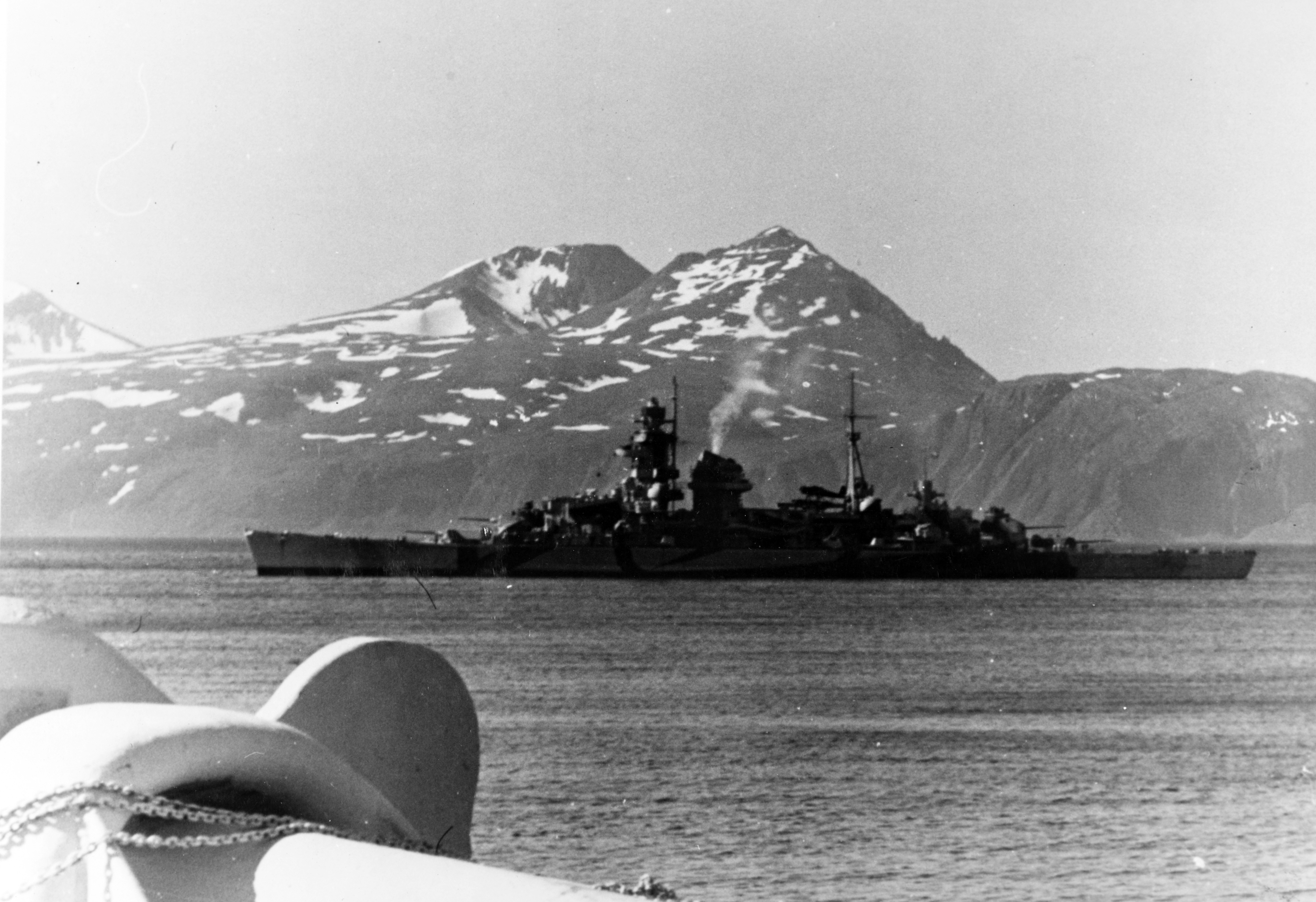
Heavy cruiser Admiral Hipper

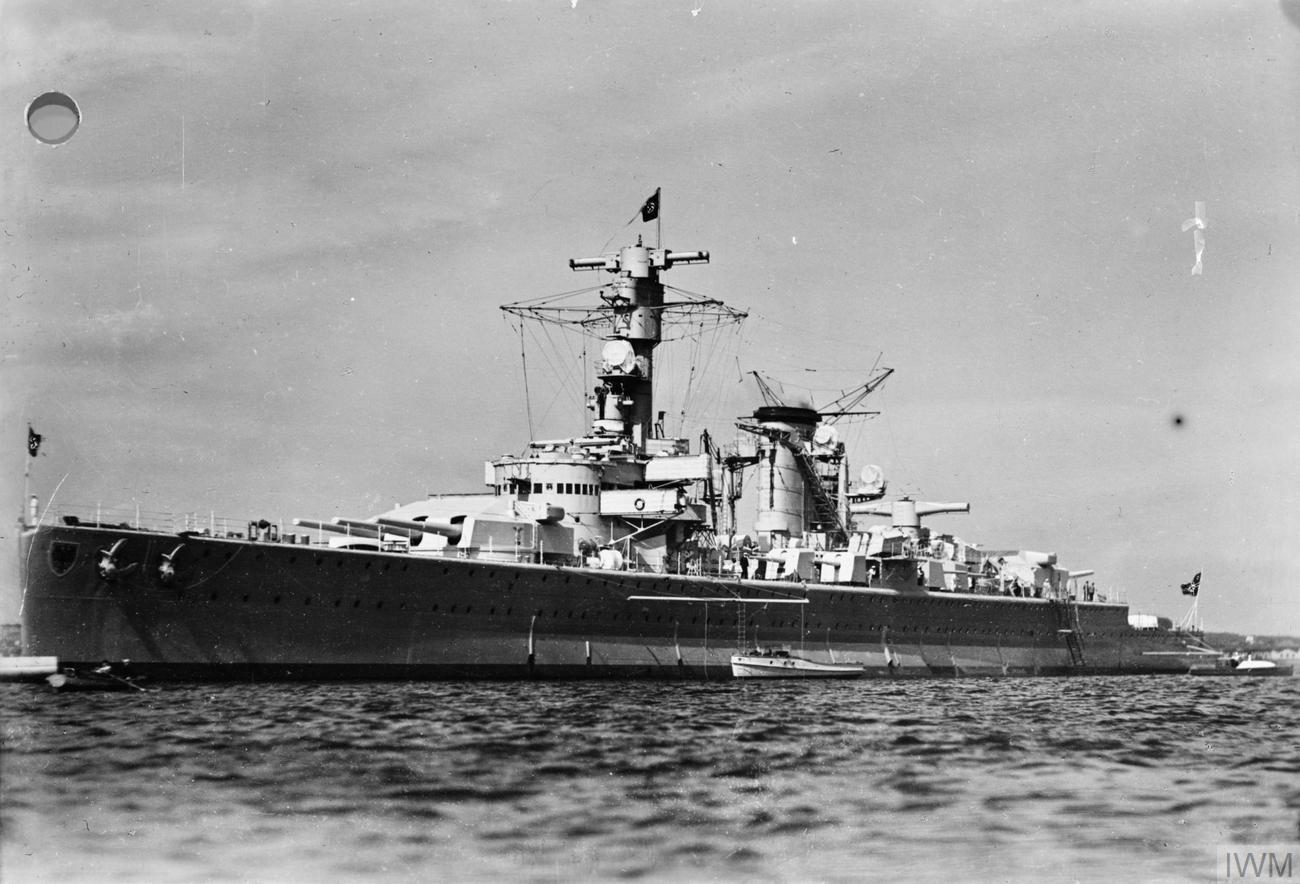
Heavy cruiser Lützow

== German order of battle ==
=== U-boats ===
Name	Flag	Class	Notes
Scouting U-boats
U-255	Kriegsmarine	Type VIIC submarine	Sank John Witherspoon, Alcoa Ranger, Olopana, Paulus Potter
U-334	Kriegsmarine	Type VIIC submarine	Sank William Hooper, Earlston (aircraft, then sunk by U-boat)
U-408	Kriegsmarine	Type VIIC submarine	
U-456	Kriegsmarine	Type VIIC submarine	Honomu (aircraft, then sunk by U-boat)
U-703	Kriegsmarine	Type VIIC submarine	Empire Byron (aircraft, then sunk by U-boat) River Afton
Gruppe Eisteufel
U-88	Kriegsmarine	Type VIIC submarine	Sank Carlton, Daniel Morgan ( aircraft, then sunk by U-boat)
U-251	Kriegsmarine	Type VIIC submarine	Sank El Capitan (aircraft, then sunk by U-boat)
U-355	Kriegsmarine	Type VIIC submarine	Sank Hartlebury
U-376	Kriegsmarine	Type VIIC submarine	Sank Hoosier (aircraft, then sunk by U-boat)
U-457	Kriegsmarine	Type VIIC submarine	Sank Christopher Newport, Aldersdale (aircraft, then sunk by U-boat)
U-657	Kriegsmarine	Type VIIC submarine	

=== Ships ===
Unternehmen Rösselsprung force
Name	Flag	Class	Notes
Force I (Drontheimgruppe, Admiral Otto Schniewind)
Tirpitz	Kriegsmarine	Bismarck-class battleship	Trondheim to Gimsøya Strait to Altafjord
Admiral Hipper	Kriegsmarine	Admiral Hipper-class cruiser	Trondheim to Gimsøya Strait to Altafjord
Z20 Karl Galster	Kriegsmarine	Type 1936-class destroyer	Trondheim to Gimsøya Strait, scraped bottom, returned Trondheim
Z14 Friedrich Ihn	Kriegsmarine	Type 1934A-class destroyer	Trondheim to Gimsøya Strait to Altafjord
Z10 Hans Lody	Kriegsmarine	Type 1934A-class destroyer	Trondheim to Gimsøya Strait, scraped bottom, returned Trondheim
Z6 Theodor Riedel	Kriegsmarine	Type 1934A-class destroyer	Trondheim to Gimsøya Strait, scraped bottom, returned Trondheim
T7	Kriegsmarine	Type 35 torpedo boat	Trondheim to Gimsøya Strait to Altafjord
T15	Kriegsmarine	Type 35 torpedo boat	Trondheim to Gimsøya Strait to Altafjord
Force II (Narvikgruppe Vice-Admiral Oskar Kummetz)
Admiral Scheer	Kriegsmarine	Deutschland-class cruiser	Narvik to Altafjord
Lützow	Kriegsmarine	Deutschland-class cruiser	Narvik to Altafjord, grounded, returned Bogen Bay
Z24	Kriegsmarine	Type 1936A-class destroyer	Narvik to Altafjord
Z27	Kriegsmarine	Type 1936A-class destroyer	Narvik to Altafjord
Z28	Kriegsmarine	Type 1936A-class destroyer	Narvik to Altafjord
Z29	Kriegsmarine	Type 1936A-class destroyer	Narvik to Altafjord
Z30	Kriegsmarine	Type 1936A-class destroyer	Narvik to Altafjord
Z4 Richard Beitzen	Kriegsmarine	Type 1934-class destroyer	Narvik to Altafjord

=== Luftflotte 5 ===
Luftflotte 5, 1 June 1942
Command	Units
Luftflotte 5 HQ Colonel-General Hans-Jürgen Stumpff
Oslo	Wettererkundungsstaffel 5 (Weather reconnaissance squadron)
Fliegerführer Nord (Ost) Oberst (Colonel) Hermann Busch
Kirkenes	I. and II./Kampfgeschwader 30; II. and 13./Jagdgeschwader 5; I./Sturzkampfgeschwader 5 (Dive-Bomber Wing); 3./Kampfgeschwader 26; 1./Seeaufklärungsgruppe 125 (Maritime Reconnaissance Wing); 1./Fernaufklärungsgruppe 22; 1./Fernaufklärungsgruppe 124 (Long-Range Reconnaissance Wing)
Fliegerführer Nord (West) Oberst Alexander Holle
Sola	I./Kampfgeschwader 26; I./Kampfgeschwader 40; 2./Küstenfliegergruppe 906 (Coastal Reconnaissance Wing); Bordfliegerstaffel Tirpitz; 1./Fernaufklärungsgruppe 120 (Long Range Reconnaissance Wing)
Fliegerführer Lofoten Oberst Ernst-August Roth
Bardufoss	III./Kampfgeschwader 30; III./Jagdgeschwader 5; 2./Kampfgeschwader 26; 4./Sturzkampfgeschwader 5; Kette 1./Fernaufklärungsgruppe 124 (Long Range Reconnaissance Wing)
Jagdfliegerführer Norwegen (Note: Fighter Commander Norway)
Trondheim	I./Jagdgeschwader 5; Jagdgruppe Drontheim (Fighter Wing)
Seenotdienstführer Norwegen (Maritime Rescue Service Leader Norway)
—	Seenotbereichskommando VIII (Maritime Rescue Area Command); Seenotbereichskommando IX

Luftflotte 5
Unit	Flag	Type	Role	No.	Notes
1./Kampfgeschwader 26	Luftwaffe	Heinkel He 111	Bomber	13	Banak
II./Kampfgeschwader 26	Luftwaffe	Heinkel He 111	Bomber	14	Banak
III./Kampfgeschwader 26	Luftwaffe	Heinkel He 111	Bomber	15	Banak
I./Kampfgeschwader 30	Luftwaffe	Junkers Ju 88A	Bomber	34	Banak
II./Kampfgeschwader 30	Luftwaffe	Junkers Ju 88A	Bomber	34	Banak
III./Kampfgeschwader 30	Luftwaffe	Junkers Ju 88A	Bomber	35	Banak
I./Küstenfliegergruppe 406	Kriegsmarine	Heinkel He 115	Torpedo-bomber	15	Sørreisa, Tromsø
I./Küstenfliegergruppe 906	Kriegsmarine	Blohm & Voss BV 138	Weather reconnaissance	—	Sørreisa, Billefjord, Tromsø
I./Sturzkampfgeschwader 26	Luftwaffe	Junkers Ju 87	Dive-bomber	30	

== Bibliography ==
- Boog, H.; Rahn, W.; Stumpf, R.; Wegner, B. (2001). The Global War: Widening of the Conflict into a World War and the Shift of the Initiative 1941–1943. Germany in the Second World War. Vol. VI. Translated by Osers, E.; Brownjohn, J.; Crampton, P.; Willmot, L. (Eng. Trans. Oxford University Press, London ed.). Potsdam: Militärgeschichtliches Forschungsamt (Research Institute for Military History). ISBN 0-19-822888-0.
  - Rahn, W. "Part III. The War at Sea in the Atlantic and in the Arctic Ocean. III. The Conduct of the War in the Atlantic and the Coastal Area (b) The Third Phase, April–December 1941: The Extension of the Areas of Operations". In Boog et al. (2001).
- Boyd, Andrew (2024). Arms for Russia & the Naval War in the Arctic 1941–1945. Barnsley: Seaforth (Pen & Sword). ISBN 978-1-3990-3886-7.
- Claasen, A. R. A. (2001). Hitler's Northern War: The Luftwaffe's Ill-fated Campaign, 1940–1945. Lawrence, KS: University Press of Kansas. ISBN 0-7006-1050-2.
- Hinsley, Harry; Thomas, E. E.; Ransom, C. F. G.; Knight, R. C. (1981). British Intelligence in the Second World War. History of the Second World War. Vol. II. London and New York: Cambridge University Press. ISBN 0-521-242908.
- Konstam, Angus (2025). Convoy PQ-17: Disaster in the Arctic. Campaign No. 414. Oxford: Osprey. ISBN 978-1-47-286427-7.
- McNab, Chris (2022) [2009]. German Luftwaffe in World War II: Illustrated Guide to German Air Force Strengths and Orders of Battle by Theatre. Battle Organisation. London: Amber Books. ISBN 978-1-83886-236-7.
- Niehorster, Leo (5 May 2015). "German Air Force, Order of Battle, 5th Air Fleet, 1 June 1942". www.niehorster.org. Archived from the original on 2 February 2025.
- Rohwer, Jürgen; Hümmelchen, Gerhard (2005) [1972]. Chronology of the War at Sea, 1939–1945: The Naval History of World War Two (3rd rev. ed.). London: Chatham Publishing. ISBN 1-86176-257-7.
- Trevor-Roper, Hugh, ed. (1966) [1964]. Hitler's War Directives 1939−1945 (repr. pbk. Pan Books, London ed.). Sidgwick and Jackson London and Holt Rinehart and Winston, New York. ISBN 0-330-20146-8.
- Woodman, Richard (1994). Arctic Convoys 1941–1945 (hbk. ed.). London: John Murray. ISBN 0-7195-5079-3.
- Ziemke, Earl F. (1959). The German Northern Theatre of Operations, 1940–1945. Washington, DC: Headquarters, United States Department of the Army. OCLC 610363660. 20-271.
