= German submarine U-376 =

German World War II submarine

History

Nazi Germany
- Name: U-376
- Ordered: 16 October 1939
- Builder: Howaldtswerke, Kiel
- Yard number: 7
- Laid down: 3 April 1940
- Launched: 10 July 1941
- Commissioned: 21 August 1941
- Fate: Missing since 7 April 1943

General characteristics
- Class & type: Type VIIC submarine
- Displacement: 769 tonnes (757 long tons) surfaced; 871 t (857 long tons) submerged
- Length: 67.10 m (220 ft 2 in) o/a; 50.50 m (165 ft 8 in) pressure hull
- Beam: 6.20 m (20 ft 4 in) o/a; 4.70 m (15 ft 5 in) pressure hull
- Height: 9.60 m (31 ft 6 in)
- Draught: 4.74 m (15 ft 7 in)
- Installed power: 2,800–3,200 PS (2,100–2,400 kW; 2,800–3,200 bhp) (diesels); 750 PS (550 kW; 740 shp) (electric)
- Propulsion: 2 shafts; 2 × diesel engines; 2 × electric motors
- Speed: 17.7 knots (32.8 km/h; 20.4 mph) surfaced; 7.6 knots (14.1 km/h; 8.7 mph) submerged
- Range: 8,500 nmi (15,700 km; 9,800 mi) at 10 knots (19 km/h; 12 mph) surfaced; 80 nmi (150 km; 92 mi) at 4 knots (7.4 km/h; 4.6 mph) submerged
- Test depth: 230 m (750 ft); Crush depth: 250–295 m (820–968 ft)
- Complement: 4 officers, 40–56 enlisted
- Armament: 5 × 53.3 cm (21 in) torpedo tubes (four bow, one stern); 14 × torpedoes; 1 × 8.8 cm (3.46 in) deck gun (220 rounds); 1 x 2 cm (0.79 in) C/30 AA gun

Service record
- Part of: 6th U-boat Flotilla; 21 August 1941 – 30 June 1942; 11th U-boat Flotilla; 1 July 1942 – 28 February 1943; 3rd U-boat Flotilla; 1 March – 7 April 1943
- Identification codes: M 03 110
- Commanders: Kptlt. Friedrich-Karl Marks; 21 August 1941 – 7 April 1943
- Operations: 8 patrols: 1st patrol: 15 March – 1 April 1942; 2nd patrol: 7 – 20 April 1942; 3rd patrol: a. 29 April – 6 May 1942; b. 7 – 13 May 1942; 4th patrol: a. 7 June – 15 July 1942; b. 18 – 20 July 1942; c. 23 – 27 July 1942; d. 27 – 28 September 1942; e. 22 – 25 October 1942; f. 31 October – 3 November 1942; 5th patrol: a. 5 November – 8 December 1942; b. 10 – 13 December 1942; 6th patrol: 26 – 28 January 1943; 7th patrol: 30 January – 13 March 1943; 8th patrol: 6 – 7 April 1943
- Victories: 2 merchant ships sunk (10,146 GRT)

German submarine U-376 was a Type VIIC U-boat of Nazi Germany's Kriegsmarine during World War II.

The submarine was laid down on 3 April 1940 in Kiel, launched on 10 July 1941, and commissioned on 21 August 1941 under the command of Oberleutnant zur See Friedrich-Karl Marks.

U-376 was attached to the 6th U-boat Flotilla, and was ready for front-line service from 1 March 1942. Operating from Norwegian bases, from 1 July 1942 she served with the 11th U-boat Flotilla, and was transferred to the 3rd U-boat Flotilla, based in France on 1 March 1943.

U-376 sailed on eight combat patrols, sinking only two merchant ships totalling 10,146 GRT before she went missing in the Bay of Biscay since 7 April 1943.

== Construction and Design ==
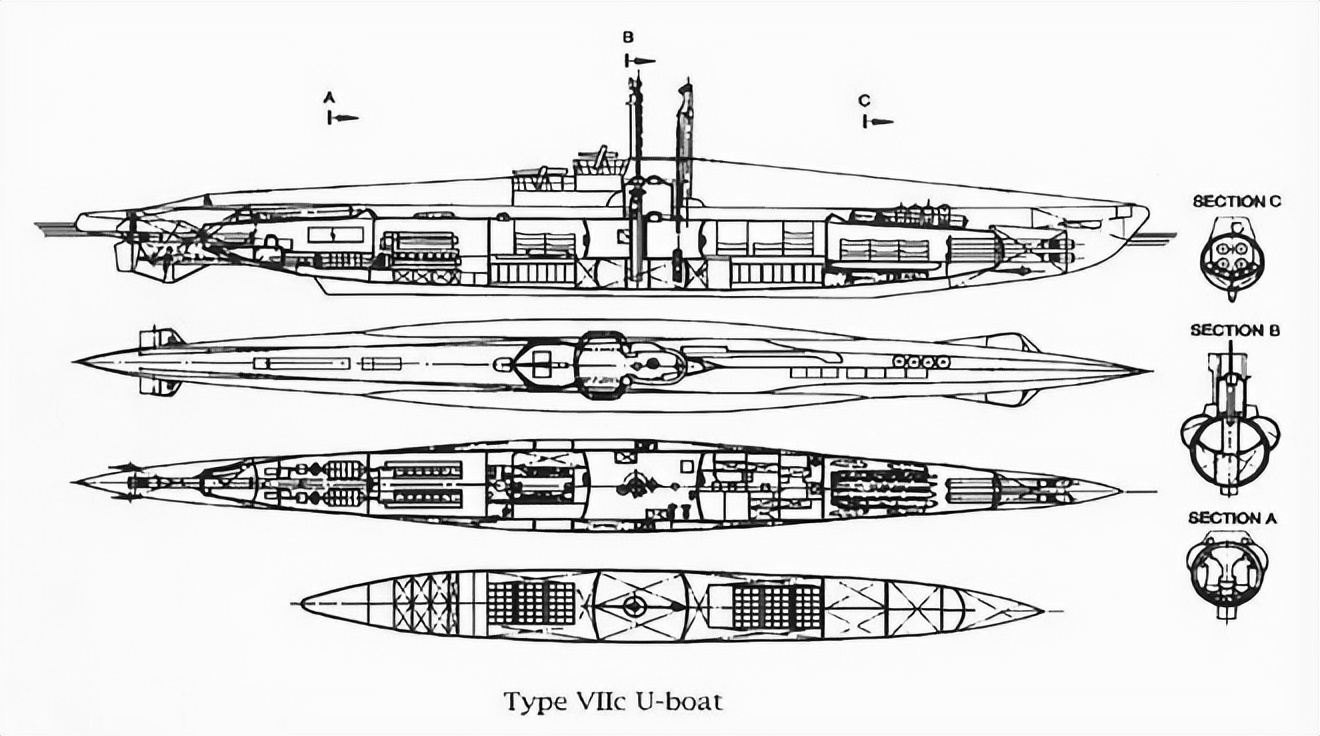
A cross-section of a Type VIIC submarine

U-376 was ordered by the Kriegsmarine on 16 October 1939. She was laid down about six months later at the Howaldtswerke yard in Kiel, on 3 April 1940. Just over a year and three months later, U-376 was launched in Kiel on 10 July 1941. She was formally commissioned into the Kriegsmarine later that year on 21 August.

German Type VIIC submarines were preceded by the shorter Type VIIB submarines. U-376 had a displacement of 769 tonnes (757 long tons) when at the surface and 871 tonnes (857 long tons) while submerged. She had a total length of 67.10 m (220 ft 2 in), a pressure hull length of 50.50 m (165 ft 8 in), a beam of 6.20 m (20 ft 4 in), a height of 9.60 m (31 ft 6 in), and a draught of 4.74 m (15 ft 7 in). The submarine was powered by two Germaniawerft F46 four-stroke, six-cylinder supercharged diesel engines producing a total of 2,800 to 3,200 metric horsepower (2,060 to 2,350 kW; 2,760 to 3,160 shp) for use while surfaced, two AEG GU 460/8–27 double-acting electric motors producing a total of 750 metric horsepower (550 kW; 740 shp) for use while submerged. She had two shafts and two 1.23 m (4 ft) propellers. The boat was capable of operating at depths of up to 230 metres (750 ft).

The submarine had a maximum surface speed of 17.7 knots (32.8 km/h; 20.4 mph) and a maximum submerged speed of 7.6 knots (14.1 km/h; 8.7 mph). When submerged, the boat could operate for 80 nautical miles (150 km; 92 mi) at 4 knots (7.4 km/h; 4.6 mph); when surfaced, she could travel 8,500 nautical miles (15,700 km; 9,800 mi) at 10 knots (19 km/h; 12 mph). U-376 was fitted with five 53.3 cm (21 in) torpedo tubes (four fitted at the bow and one at the stern), fourteen torpedoes, one 8.8 cm (3.46 in) SK C/35 naval gun, 220 rounds, and a 2 cm (0.79 in) C/30 anti-aircraft gun. The boat had a complement of between forty-four and sixty.

== Service history ==
=== First patrol ===
U-376, under the command of Kapitänleutnant Friedrich-Karl Marks, left Kiel on 11 March 1942, arriving at Heligoland in the North Sea the next day. She sailed on her first combat patrol on the 15th, heading north into the Barents Sea. There, on 30 March she torpedoed and sank the 5,086 GRT British merchant ship Induna, part of the Arctic convoy PQ 13, en -route to Murmansk.

Forty-one survivors, from the crew of 66, abandoned ship in two lifeboats in temperatures around −20 °C (−4 °F) and freezing winds. Only 30 were still alive on 2 April when they were picked up by a Russian minesweeper, two subsequently died of exposure.

The U-boat arrived at Kirkenes in the far northeast of Norway, on 1 April 1942.

=== Second and third patrols ===
U-376 sailed on two patrols from Kirkenes, from 7 to 20 April, and from 29 April to 6 May, without success, before sailing to Bergen in Norway in early May.

=== Fourth patrol ===
U-376 left Bergen on 7 June 1942, sailing to the waters north of Iceland before returning to the Barents Sea. where on 10 July, she sank the 5,060 GRT American Hog Islander Hoosier, en route to Arkhangelsk with a cargo of 5,029 tons of machinery and explosives, and tanks as deck cargo. Part of Convoy PQ 17, the ship had been bombed the previous day by several Junkers Ju 88 aircraft of KG 30, which had disabled the engines. Taken in tow by HMS La Malouine she was abandoned when U-255 was sighted in pursuit. The drifting wreck of Hoosier was hit by two torpedoes from U-376 and sank.

The U-boat arrived at Narvik on 15 July, sailing to Bergen after three days, before spending August to October at Wilhelmshaven and Kiel. She returned to Bergen on 25 October, then sailed to Skjomenfjord on 3 November 1942.

=== Fifth patrol ===
U-376 left Skjomenfjord on 5 November to patrol the Barents Sea once more, arriving at Narvik on 8 December, having had no success.

=== Sixth patrol ===
She returned to Bergen before setting out once more on 26 January 1943, but was attacked by Allied aircraft the next day and was forced to return to base with several crewmen wounded.

=== Seventh patrol ===
The U-boat left Bergen on 30 January, but during the night her third watch officer was washed overboard. U-376 returned to Bergen to embark a replacement and departed the same day. This patrol took her out into the Atlantic, south of Greenland, before she arrived at her new home port of La Pallice in France on 13 March.

=== Eighth patrol and loss ===
U-376 sailed from La Pallice on 6 April 1943 on a mission to take on board German Naval officers who had escaped from a prisoner of war Camp 70 near Fredericton, New Brunswick and make their way to North Cape Prince Edward Island, Canada. U-376 was preceded by the mission's backup boat, U-262, which had left from the same port on 27 March, but had had to return due to a defective air vent, and sailed again on 7 April. The commanding officer of U-376 was Kapitänleutnant Friedrich-Karl Marks, a Naval officer with nearly ten years experience. On April 10, 1943, at 05:17a.m., Kapitänleutnant Marks received the order to take a "new course in accordance with special order..." the signal to initiate Operation Elster. After failing to make required daily contact for three consecutive days, U-376 was declared missing on April 15, 1943. Following this, U-262 the backup boat to U-376, received the order to take over Operation Elster from the missing U-boat.

It is documented that there was a "sea exercise" at North Cape, Prince Edward Island, Canada on the morning of May 7, 1943 between 09:00 a.m. and 01:00p.m., which involved the American ships USS Haste, USS Intensity and USS Alacrity, and witnesses at the time claim a submarine was SUNK. U-376 and her 37 crew members are still missing.

U-376 was missing since 7 April 1943 in the Bay of Biscay.

=== Previously recorded fate ===
A postwar assessment claimed that U-376 was sunk April 10, 1943 in the Bay of Biscay west of Nantes, France at position 46°48′N 09°00′W by depth charges from a British Wellington aircraft of Squadron 172/C. This attack was actually against U-465, inflicting severe damage.

=== Wolfpacks ===
U-376 took part in nine wolfpacks, namely:

- Zieten (23 – 29 March 1942)
- Eiswolf (29 – 31 March 1942)
- Robbenschlag (7 – 14 April 1942)
- Blutrausch (15 – 19 April 1942)
- Strauchritter (29 April – 5 May 1942)
- Eisteufel (1 – 4 July 1942)
- Eisteufel (6 – 12 July 1942)
- Boreas (19 November – 7 December 1942)
- Neptun (18 February – 2 March 1943)

== Summary of raiding history ==
Ship	Flag	GRT	Notes
Induna	United Kingdom	5,086	Sunk, 30 March 1942
Hoosier	United States	5,060	Sunk, 10 July 1942

== Bibliography ==
- Busch, Rainer; Röll, Hans-Joachim (1999). German U-boat commanders of World War II : a biographical dictionary. Translated by Brooks, Geoffrey. London, Annapolis, Md: Greenhill Books, Naval Institute Press. ISBN 1-55750-186-6.
- Busch, Rainer; Röll, Hans-Joachim (1999). Deutsche U-Boot-Verluste von September 1939 bis Mai 1945 [German U-boat losses from September 1939 to May 1945]. Der U-Boot-Krieg (in German). Vol. IV. Hamburg, Berlin, Bonn: Mittler. ISBN 3-8132-0514-2.
- Gröner, Erich; Jung, Dieter; Maass, Martin (1991). U-boats and Mine Warfare Vessels. German Warships 1815–1945. Vol. 2. Translated by Thomas, Keith; Magowan, Rachel. London: Conway Maritime Press. ISBN 0-85177-593-4.
