= German submarine U-334 =

German World War II submarine

Coordinates: 58°16′N 28°20′W

History

Nazi Germany
- Name: U-334
- Ordered: 23 September 1939
- Builder: Nordseewerke, Emden
- Yard number: 206
- Laid down: 16 March 1940
- Launched: 15 August 1941
- Commissioned: 9 October 1941
- Fate: Sunk on 14 June 1943

General characteristics
- Class & type: Type VIIC submarine
- Displacement: 769 tonnes (757 long tons) surfaced; 871 t (857 long tons) submerged
- Length: 67.10 m (220 ft 2 in) o/a; 50.50 m (165 ft 8 in) pressure hull
- Beam: 6.20 m (20 ft 4 in) o/a; 4.70 m (15 ft 5 in) pressure hull
- Height: 9.60 m (31 ft 6 in)
- Draught: 4.74 m (15 ft 7 in)
- Installed power: 2,800–3,200 PS (2,100–2,400 kW; 2,800–3,200 bhp) (diesels); 750 PS (550 kW; 740 shp) (electric)
- Propulsion: 2 shafts; 2 × diesel engines; 2 × electric motors
- Speed: 17.7 knots (32.8 km/h; 20.4 mph) surfaced; 7.6 knots (14.1 km/h; 8.7 mph) submerged
- Range: 8,500 nmi (15,700 km; 9,800 mi) at 10 knots (19 km/h; 12 mph) surfaced; 80 nmi (150 km; 92 mi) at 4 knots (7.4 km/h; 4.6 mph) submerged
- Test depth: 230 m (750 ft); Crush depth: 250–295 m (820–968 ft)
- Complement: 4 officers, 40–56 enlisted
- Armament: 5 × 53.3 cm (21 in) torpedo tubes (four bow, one stern); 14 × torpedoes or 26 TMA mines; 1 × 8.8 cm (3.46 in) deck gun (220 rounds); 1 x 2 cm (0.79 in) C/30 AA gun

Service record
- Part of: 8th U-boat Flotilla; 9 October 1941 – 28 February 1942; 3rd U-boat Flotilla; 1 March – 30 June 1942; 11th U-boat Flotilla; 1 July 1942 – 14 June 1943
- Identification codes: M 33 704
- Commanders: Kptlt. Hilmar Siemon; 9 October 1941 – 31 March 1943; Oblt.z.S. Heinz Ehrich; 1 April – 14 June 1943
- Operations: 4 patrols: 1st patrol: 18 March – 14 April 1942; 2nd patrol: a. 7 – 10 June 1942; b. 15 June – 6 July 1942; c. 9 – 14 July 1942; 3rd patrol: a. 31 October – 1 December 1942; b. 2 – 4 December 1942; c. 12 – 16 December 1942; 4th patrol: 5 – 14 June 1943
- Victories: 2 merchant ships sunk (14,372 GRT)

German submarine U-334 was a Type VIIC U-boat of Nazi Germany's Kriegsmarine during World War II. The submarine was laid down on 16 March 1940 at the Nordseewerke yard at Emden as yard number 206, launched on 15 August 1941 and commissioned on 9 October under the command of Kapitänleutnant Hilmar Siemon. During her career, the U-boat sailed on four combat patrols, sinking two ships of 14,372 gross register tons (GRT), before she was sunk on 14 June 1943.

== Design ==
German Type VIIC submarines were preceded by the shorter Type VIIB submarines. U-334 had a displacement of 769 tonnes (757 long tons) when at the surface and 871 tonnes (857 long tons) while submerged. She had a total length of 67.10 m (220 ft 2 in), a pressure hull length of 50.50 m (165 ft 8 in), a beam of 6.20 m (20 ft 4 in), a height of 9.60 m (31 ft 6 in), and a draught of 4.74 m (15 ft 7 in). The submarine was powered by two Germaniawerft F46 four-stroke, six-cylinder supercharged diesel engines producing a total of 2,800 to 3,200 metric horsepower (2,060 to 2,350 kW; 2,760 to 3,160 shp) for use while surfaced, two AEG GU 460/8–27 double-acting electric motors producing a total of 750 metric horsepower (550 kW; 740 shp) for use while submerged. She had two shafts and two 1.23 m (4 ft) propellers. The boat was capable of operating at depths of up to 230 metres (750 ft).

The submarine had a maximum surface speed of 17.7 knots (32.8 km/h; 20.4 mph) and a maximum submerged speed of 7.6 knots (14.1 km/h; 8.7 mph). When submerged, the boat could operate for 80 nautical miles (150 km; 92 mi) at 4 knots (7.4 km/h; 4.6 mph); when surfaced, she could travel 8,500 nautical miles (15,700 km; 9,800 mi) at 10 knots (19 km/h; 12 mph). U-334 was fitted with five 53.3 cm (21 in) torpedo tubes (four fitted at the bow and one at the stern), fourteen torpedoes, one 8.8 cm (3.46 in) SK C/35 naval gun, 220 rounds, and a 2 cm (0.79 in) C/30 anti-aircraft gun. The boat had a complement of between forty-four and sixty.

== Service history ==
After training with the 8th U-boat Flotilla, she moved to the 3rd flotilla for front-line service in March 1942. She was reassigned to the 11th flotilla in July.

=== First patrol ===
U-334's maiden patrol saw the U-boat sail into the Greenland Sea; it was then marred by the loss overboard of 19-year-old Matrosengefreiter Otto Mayerhof in the Barents Sea on 13 April 1942, a day before the submarine docked at Trondheim in Norway.

=== Second patrol ===
Her second foray was split into two parts. During the second, longer portion, the boat sank the William Hopper, a former member of the notorious convoy PQ 17 on 4 July 1942. The ship had already been badly damaged in an air attack. In a scuttling attempt, she was fired-on by a British escort vessel, but stubbornly refused to sink. Later that same day, U-334 fired two 'coup de grâce' torpedoes at the ship; the first was defective, the second missed. The wreck was eventually sunk by fire from the boat's deck gun.

The following day (5 July 1942), she sank the Earlston, also a member of the ill-fated convoy. She too, had already been damaged by bombs. U-334 was also subject to attack from the air that day; a Ju 88 damaged the steering gear and rendered the U-boat unable to dive. U-456 was obliged to escort U-334 to Neidenfjord.

She then sailed from Neidenfjord to Trondheim, arriving on 14 July.

=== Third patrol ===
Sortie number three took the boat north of Iceland and into the Norwegian Sea, finishing at Narvik.

=== Fourth patrol and loss ===
Following short trips from Narvik to Trondheim and Trondheim to Bergen, the submarine commenced her fourth patrol from Bergen on 5 June 1943. She passed through the gap between Iceland and the Faroe Islands. She was sunk by depth charges from the British frigate HMS Jed and the sloop HMS Pelican southwest of Iceland.

Forty-seven men died; there were no survivors.

=== Wolfpacks ===
U-334 took part in three wolfpacks, namely:

- Naseweis (31 March – 10 April 1942)
- Bums (10 – 12 April 1942)
- Eisteufel (21 June – 5 July 1942)

== Summary of raiding history ==
| Date | Ship | Nationality | Tonnage (GRT) | Fate |
|---|---|---|---|---|
| 4 July 1942 | William Hooper | United States | 7,177 | Sunk |
| 5 July 1942 | Earlston | United Kingdom | 7,195 | Sunk |

== Bibliography ==
- Busch, Rainer; Röll, Hans-Joachim (1999). German U-boat commanders of World War II : a biographical dictionary. Translated by Brooks, Geoffrey. London, Annapolis, Md: Greenhill Books, Naval Institute Press. ISBN 1-55750-186-6.
- Busch, Rainer; Röll, Hans-Joachim (1999). Der U-Boot-Krieg, 1939-1945: Deutsche U-Boot-Verluste von September 1939 bis Mai 1945 [German U-boat losses from September 1939 to May 1945] (in German). Vol. IV. Hamburg, Berlin, Bonn: Mittler. ISBN 3-8132-0514-2.
- Gröner, Erich; Jung, Dieter; Maass, Martin (1991). U-boats and Mine Warfare Vessels. German Warships 1815–1945. Vol. 2. Translated by Thomas, Keith; Magowan, Rachel. London: Conway Maritime Press. ISBN 0-85177-593-4.
- Kemp, Paul (1999). U-Boats Destroyed - German Submarine Losses in the World Wars. London: Arms & Armour. ISBN 1-85409-515-3.
