= German submarine U-88 (1941) =

German World War II submarine

History

Nazi Germany
- Name: U-88
- Ordered: 25 January 1939
- Builder: Flender Werke, Lübeck
- Yard number: 292
- Laid down: 1 July 1940
- Launched: 16 August 1941
- Commissioned: 15 October 1941
- Fate: Sunk 12 September 1942

General characteristics
- Class & type: Type VIIC submarine
- Displacement: 769 tonnes (757 long tons) surfaced; 871 t (857 long tons) submerged
- Length: 67.10 m (220 ft 2 in) o/a; 50.50 m (165 ft 8 in) pressure hull
- Beam: 6.20 m (20 ft 4 in) o/a; 4.70 m (15 ft 5 in) pressure hull
- Height: 9.60 m (31 ft 6 in)
- Draught: 4.74 m (15 ft 7 in)
- Installed power: 2,800–3,200 PS (2,100–2,400 kW; 2,800–3,200 bhp) (diesels); 750 PS (550 kW; 740 shp) (electric)
- Propulsion: 2 shafts; 2 × diesel engines; 2 × electric motors
- Speed: 17.7 knots (32.8 km/h; 20.4 mph) surfaced; 7.6 knots (14.1 km/h; 8.7 mph) submerged
- Range: 8,500 nmi (15,700 km; 9,800 mi) at 10 knots (19 km/h; 12 mph) surfaced; 80 nmi (150 km; 92 mi) at 4 knots (7.4 km/h; 4.6 mph) submerged
- Test depth: 230 m (750 ft); Crush depth: 250–295 m (820–968 ft)
- Complement: 4 officers, 40–56 enlisted
- Armament: 5 × 53.3 cm (21 in) torpedo tubes (four bow, one stern); 14 × torpedoes; 1 × 8.8 cm (3.46 in) deck gun (220 rounds); 1 x 2 cm (0.79 in) C/30 AA gun

Service record
- Part of: 8th U-boat Flotilla; 15 October 1941 – 30 April 1942; 7th U-boat Flotilla; 1 May – 30 June 1942; 11th U-boat Flotilla; 1 July – 12 September 1942
- Identification codes: M 27 945
- Commanders: Kptlt. Heino Bohmann; 15 October 1941 – 12 September 1942
- Operations: 3 patrols: 1st patrol: a. 29 April – 3 May 1942; b. 4 – 6 May 1942; 2nd patrol: 17 June – 11 July 1942; 3rd patrol: 25 August – 12 September 1942
- Victories: 2 merchant ships sunk (12,304 GRT)

German submarine U-88 was a Type VIIC U-boat of Nazi Germany's Kriegsmarine during World War II.

She was laid down at the Flender Werke in Lübeck as yard number 292, launched on 16 August 1941 and commissioned on 15 October with Kapitänleutnant Heino Bohmann in command.

She was a fairly successful boat, succeeding in sinking 12,304 GRT of Allied shipping in a career lasting just one year over three patrols.

== Design ==
German Type VIIC submarines were preceded by the shorter Type VIIB submarines. U-88 had a displacement of 769 tonnes (757 long tons) when at the surface and 871 tonnes (857 long tons) while submerged. She had a total length of 67.10 m (220 ft 2 in), a pressure hull length of 50.50 m (165 ft 8 in), a beam of 6.20 m (20 ft 4 in), a height of 9.60 m (31 ft 6 in), and a draught of 4.74 m (15 ft 7 in). The submarine was powered by two MAN M 6 V 40/46 four-stroke, six-cylinder supercharged diesel engines producing a total of 2,800 to 3,200 metric horsepower (2,060 to 2,350 kW; 2,760 to 3,160 shp) for use while surfaced, two Brown, Boveri & Cie GG UB 720/8 double-acting electric motors producing a total of 750 metric horsepower (550 kW; 740 shp) for use while submerged. She had two shafts and two 1.23 m (4 ft) propellers. The boat was capable of operating at depths of up to 230 metres (750 ft).

The submarine had a maximum surface speed of 17.7 knots (32.8 km/h; 20.4 mph) and a maximum submerged speed of 7.6 knots (14.1 km/h; 8.7 mph). When submerged, the boat could operate for 80 nautical miles (150 km; 92 mi) at 4 knots (7.4 km/h; 4.6 mph); when surfaced, she could travel 8,500 nautical miles (15,700 km; 9,800 mi) at 10 knots (19 km/h; 12 mph). U-88 was fitted with five 53.3 cm (21 in) torpedo tubes (four fitted at the bow and one at the stern), fourteen torpedoes, one 8.8 cm (3.46 in) SK C/35 naval gun, 220 rounds, and a 2 cm (0.79 in) C/30 anti-aircraft gun. The boat had a complement of between forty-four and sixty.

== Service history ==
=== First patrol ===
Having moved from Kiel to Kirkenes in Norway in April 1942, U-88 departed for her first patrol on the 29th. She returned on 3 May.

=== Second patrol ===
The boat moved from Kirkenes to Narvik in early May and set-off for her second patrol on 17 June 1942. She sank two American ships, part of the ill-fated Convoy PQ 17, on 5 July. After a three-hour pursuit, the Carlton was hit by a torpedo which did not detonate. A second torpedo exploded on impact, the ship sank in ten minutes. U-88 then hit the Daniel Morgan which had already been attacked by German aircraft. Three men died, there were 51 survivors.

=== Third patrol and loss ===
U-88 left Narvik on 25 August 1942 for her final patrol. She was sunk south of Spitzbergen at 75°04′N 04°49′E by depth charges from the British destroyer HMS Faulknor on 12 September. Forty-six men died; there were no survivors.

==== Alternate account of loss ====
U-88 was sunk on 14 September 1942 by depth charges from the British destroyer HMS Onslow.

=== Wolfpacks ===
U-88 took part in three wolfpacks, namely:

- Strauchritter (29 April - 2 May 1942)
- Eisteufel (21 June - 11 July 1942)
- Trägertod (12 September 1942)

== Summary of raiding history ==
Date	Ship	Nationality	Tonnage	Fate
5 July 1942	Carlton	United States	5,127	Sunk
5 July 1942	Daniel Morgan	United States	7,177	Sunk

== See also ==
- Convoy PQ 17
- Convoy PQ 18

== Bibliography ==
- Busch, Rainer; Röll, Hans-Joachim (1999). German U-boat commanders of World War II : a biographical dictionary. Translated by Brooks, Geoffrey. London, Annapolis, Md: Greenhill Books, Naval Institute Press. ISBN 1-55750-186-6.
- Busch, Rainer; Röll, Hans-Joachim (1999). Der U-Boot-Krieg, 1939-1945: Deutsche U-Boot-Verluste von September 1939 bis Mai 1945 [German U-boat losses from September 1939 to May 1945] (in German). Vol. IV. Hamburg, Berlin, Bonn: Mittler. ISBN 3-8132-0514-2.
- Gröner, Eric; Jung, Dieter; Maass, Martin (1991). German Warships 1815-1945: U-boats and Mine Warfare Vessels. Vol. 2. Translated by Thomas, Keith; Magowan, Rachel. London: Conway Maritime Press. ISBN 0-85177-593-4.
- Kemp, Paul (1999). U-Boats Destroyed - German Submarine Losses in the World Wars. London: Arms & Armour. ISBN 1-85409-515-3.
- Smith, Peter (1968). Destroyer Leader: The Story of HMS Faulknor. London: William Kimber & Co.
