= Wolfpack Eisteufel =

- Active: 21 June 1942 – 12 July 1942
- Country: Nazi Germany
- Branch: Kriegsmarine
- Size: 10 submarines
- Engagements: Convoy PQ 17

Commanders
- Notable commanders: Reinhart Reche; Max-Martin Teichert; Heinrich Timm

Eisteufel (Ice Devil) was a wolfpack of German U-boats that operated from 21 June 1942 to 12 July 1942 in the Battle of the Atlantic, during the Second World War.

== Service ==
The group was responsible for sinking 13 merchant ships totalling 83,019 gross register tons (GRT).

=== Raiding History ===
Convoy PQ 17
Date	U-boat	Ship	Flag	GRT	Notes
4 July 1942	U-457	Christopher Newport	United States	7,191	
4 July 1942	U-334	William Hooper	United States	7,177	
5 July 1942	U-88	Carlton	United States	5,127	
5 July 1942	U-88	Daniel Morgan	United States	7,177	
5 July 1942	U-334	Earlston	United Kingdom	7,195	
5 July 1942	U-456	Honomu	United States	6,977	
6 July 1942	U-255	John Witherspoon	United States	7,191	
7 July 1942	U-255	Alcoa Ranger	United States	5,116	
7 July 1942	U-457	RFA Aldersdale	Royal Navy	8,402	
7 July 1942	U-355	Hartlebury	United Kingdom	5,082	
8 July 1942	U-255	Olopana	United States	6,069	
10 July 1942	U-251	El Capitan	Panama	5,255	
10 July 1942	U-376	Hoosier	United States	5,060	

=== U-boats ===
U-boat	Commander	Dates
U-88	Heino Bohmann	21 June 1942 – 11 July 1942
U-251	Heinrich Timm	21 June 1942 – 12 July 1942
U-255	Reinhart Reche	1–12 July 1942
U-334	Hilmar Siemon	21 June 1942 – 5 July 1942
U-355	Günter La Baume	21 June 1942 – 9 July 1942
U-376	Friedrich-Karl Marks	1–6 July 1942, 4–12 July 1942
U-408	Reinhard von Hymmen	21 June 1942 – 10 July 1942
U-456	Max-Martin Teichert	27 June 1942 – 5 July 1942
U-457	Karl Brandenburg	30 June 1942 – 12 July 1942
U-657	Heinrich Göllnitz	21 June 1942 – 8 July 1942
