= German submarine U-251 =

German World War II submarine

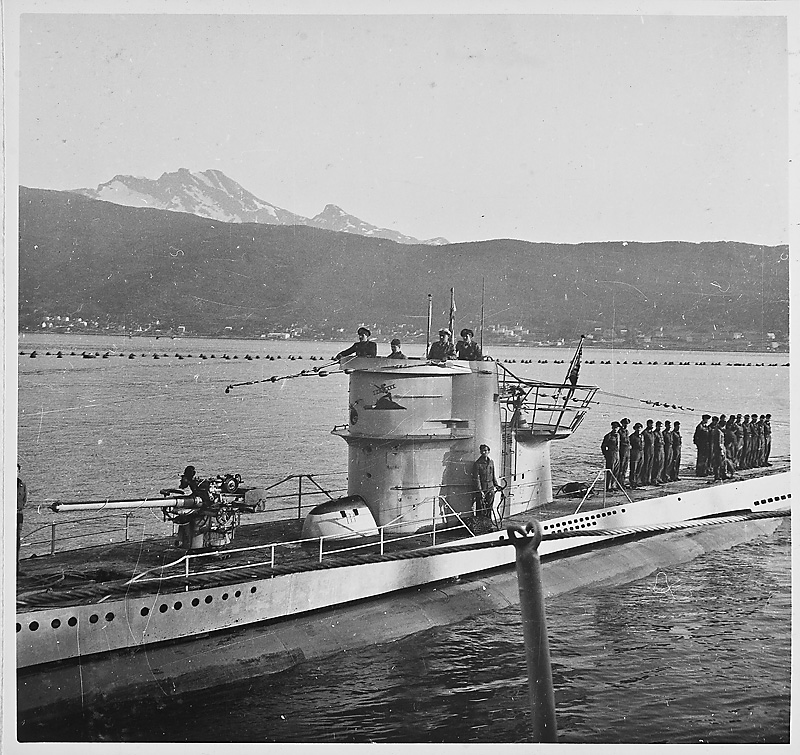
- U-251 in Narvik in July 1942

History

Nazi Germany
- Name: U-251
- Ordered: 23 September 1939
- Builder: Bremer Vulkan-Vegesacker Werft, Bremen
- Yard number: 16
- Laid down: 18 October 1940
- Launched: 26 July 1941
- Commissioned: 20 September 1941
- Fate: Sunk by rockets from no less than eight British and Norwegian Mosquitos of 143, 235 and 248 squadrons in the Kattegat on 19 April 1945

General characteristics
- Class & type: Type VIIC submarine
- Displacement: 769 tonnes (757 long tons) surfaced; 871 t (857 long tons) submerged
- Length: 67.10 m (220 ft 2 in) o/a; 50.50 m (165 ft 8 in) pressure hull
- Beam: 6.20 m (20 ft 4 in) o/a; 4.70 m (15 ft 5 in) pressure hull
- Height: 9.60 m (31 ft 6 in)
- Draught: 4.74 m (15 ft 7 in)
- Installed power: 2,800–3,200 PS (2,100–2,400 kW; 2,800–3,200 bhp) (diesels); 750 PS (550 kW; 740 shp) (electric)
- Propulsion: 2 shafts; 2 × diesel engines; 2 × electric motors
- Speed: 17.7 knots (32.8 km/h; 20.4 mph) surfaced; 7.6 knots (14.1 km/h; 8.7 mph) submerged
- Range: 8,500 nmi (15,700 km; 9,800 mi) at 10 knots (19 km/h; 12 mph) surfaced; 80 nmi (150 km; 92 mi) at 4 knots (7.4 km/h; 4.6 mph) submerged
- Test depth: 230 m (750 ft); Crush depth: 250–295 m (820–968 ft)
- Complement: 4 officers, 40–56 enlisted
- Armament: 5 × 53.3 cm (21 in) torpedo tubes (four bow, one stern); 14 × torpedoes or 26 TMA mines; 1 × 8.8 cm (3.46 in) deck gun(220 rounds); 2 × twin 2 cm (0.79 in) C/30 anti-aircraft guns

Service record
- Part of: 6th U-boat Flotilla; 20 September 1941 – 30 June 1942; 11th U-boat Flotilla; 1 July 1942 – 31 May 1943; 13th U-boat Flotilla; 1 – 30 June 1943; 24th U-boat Flotilla; 1 July – 30 November 1943; 21st U-boat Flotilla; 1 December 1943 – 28 February 1945; 31st U-boat Flotilla; 1 March – 19 April 1945
- Identification codes: M 15 758
- Commanders: Kptlt. Heinrich Timm; 20 September 1941 – 1 September 1943; Oblt.z.S. Franz Sack; 23 November 1943 – 19 April 1945
- Operations: 10 patrols: 1st patrol: a. 20 – 25 April 1942; b. 29 April – 7 May 1942; c. 9 – 13 May 1942; d. 15 – 17 May 1942; e. 22 – 24 May 1942; 2nd patrol: 26 – 29 May 1942; 3rd patrol: a. 7 June – 5 July 1942; b. 6 – 15 July 1942; 4th patrol: a. 14 August 1942; b. 15 Aug – 13 September 1942; 5th patrol: 14 September – 3 October 1942; 6th patrol: 14 February – 1 March 1943; 7th patrol: a. 18 March – 21 April 1943; b. 8 – 10 May 1943; 8th patrol: 12 – 29 May 1943; 9th patrol: 13 – 24 June 1943; 10th patrol: 16 – 19 April 1945
- Victories: 2 merchant ships sunk (11,408 GRT)

German submarine U-251 was a Type VIIC U-boat of Nazi Germany's Kriegsmarine during World War II. The submarine was laid down on 18 October 1940 at the Bremer-Vulkan-Vegesacker Werft (yard) in Bremen as yard number 16, launched on 26 July 1941 and commissioned on 20 September under the command of Kapitänleutnant Heinrich Timm.

In ten patrols, she sank two ships of 11,408 gross register tons (GRT). She was a member of three wolfpacks.

She was sunk by British and Norwegian aircraft in the Kattegat of the Danish Island of Anholt on 19 April 1945.

The U-251 can be seen on YouTube video 'Diving on Nazi submarine U-251'.

== Design ==
German Type VIIC submarines were preceded by the shorter Type VIIB submarines. U-251 had a displacement of 769 tonnes (757 long tons) when at the surface and 871 tonnes (857 long tons) while submerged. She had a total length of 67.10 m (220 ft 2 in), a pressure hull length of 50.50 m (165 ft 8 in), a beam of 6.20 m (20 ft 4 in), a height of 9.60 m (31 ft 6 in), and a draught of 4.74 m (15 ft 7 in). The submarine was powered by two Germaniawerft F46 four-stroke, six-cylinder supercharged diesel engines producing a total of 2,800 to 3,200 metric horsepower (2,060 to 2,350 kW; 2,760 to 3,160 shp) for use while surfaced, two AEG GU 460/8–27 double-acting electric motors producing a total of 750 metric horsepower (550 kW; 740 shp) for use while submerged. She had two shafts and two 1.23 m (4 ft) propellers. The boat was capable of operating at depths of up to 230 metres (750 ft).

The submarine had a maximum surface speed of 17.7 knots (32.8 km/h; 20.4 mph) and a maximum submerged speed of 7.6 knots (14.1 km/h; 8.7 mph). When submerged, the boat could operate for 80 nautical miles (150 km; 92 mi) at 4 knots (7.4 km/h; 4.6 mph); when surfaced, she could travel 8,500 nautical miles (15,700 km; 9,800 mi) at 10 knots (19 km/h; 12 mph). U-251 was fitted with five 53.3 cm (21 in) torpedo tubes (four fitted at the bow and one at the stern), fourteen torpedoes, one 8.8 cm (3.46 in) SK C/35 naval gun, 220 rounds, and two twin 2 cm (0.79 in) C/30 anti-aircraft guns. The boat had a complement of between forty-four and sixty.

== Service history ==
After training with the 6th U-boat Flotilla, she became operational on 1 May 1942. U-245 was transferred to the 11th flotilla on 1 July and the 13th flotilla on 1 June 1943. There followed spells with the 24th, 21st and 31st flotillas, (see infobox for dates).

=== First patrol ===
The boat's first patrol was preceded by a short trip between Kiel and Kristiansand in Norway. Her first sortie proper began with her departure from Kristiansand on 20 April 1942. The second part of this patrol was marked by sinking the Jutland south of Bear Island on 3 May after the ship had been hit by bombs from German aircraft. She then made three forays from Kirkenes, Skjomenfjord and Trondheim over the rest of May.

=== Second patrol ===
Her second patrol was also in May and covered the eastern Norwegian Sea.

=== Third patrol ===
The submarine sank the El Capitan on 17 July 1942 near northeast Iceland. This ship was with Convoy PQ 17 before being attacked by Luftwaffe Ju 88s. The ship had been abandoned; U-251 finished her off.

For the rest of her career, the U-boat patrolled northern waters; at one time steaming as far north and east as Novaya Zemlya in the Kara Sea.

=== Tenth patrol and loss ===
By the time of her tenth sortie, the Allies dominated the air. This situation was dramatically demonstrated when the boat was sunk by rockets from no less than eight British and Norwegian Mosquitos of 143, 235 and 248 squadrons in the Kattegat on 19 April 1945.

Thirty-nine men died; there were four survivors.

=== Wolfpacks ===
U-251 took part in three wolfpacks, namely:

- Strauchritter (29 April – 5 May 1942)
- Eisteufel (21 June – 12 July 1942)
- Eisbär (27 March – 15 April 1943)

== Summary of raiding history ==
Date	Ship Name	Nationality	Tonnage (GRT)	Fate
3 May 1942	Jutland	United Kingdom	6,153	Sunk
10 July 1942	El Capitan	Panama	5,255	Sunk

== Bibliography ==
- Busch, Rainer; Röll, Hans-Joachim (1999). German U-boat commanders of World War II : a biographical dictionary. Translated by Brooks, Geoffrey. London, Annapolis, Md: Greenhill Books, Naval Institute Press. ISBN 1-55750-186-6.
- Busch, Rainer; Röll, Hans-Joachim (1999). Der U-Boot-Krieg, 1939-1945: Deutsche U-Boot-Verluste von September 1939 bis Mai 1945 [German U-boat losses from September 1939 to May 1945] (in German). Vol. IV. Hamburg, Berlin, Bonn: Mittler. ISBN 3-8132-0514-2.
- Gröner, Eric; Jung, Dieter; Maass, Martin (1991). German Warships 1815-1945: U-boats and Mine Warfare Vessels. Vol. 2. Translated by Thomas, Keith; Magowan, Rachel. London: Conway Maritime Press. ISBN 0-85177-593-4.
- Kemp, Paul (1999). U-Boats Destroyed – German Submarine Losses in the World Wars. London: Arms & Armour. ISBN 1-85409-515-3.
