= German submarine U-355 =

German World War II submarine

History

Nazi Germany
- Name: U-355
- Ordered: 26 October 1939
- Builder: Flensburger Schiffbau-Gesellschaft, Flensburg
- Yard number: 474
- Laid down: 4 May 1940
- Launched: 5 July 1941
- Commissioned: 29 October 1941
- Fate: Missing since 1 April 1944

General characteristics
- Class & type: Type VIIC submarine
- Displacement: 769 tonnes (757 long tons) surfaced; 871 t (857 long tons) submerged
- Length: 67.10 m (220 ft 2 in) o/a; 50.50 m (165 ft 8 in) pressure hull
- Beam: 6.20 m (20 ft 4 in) o/a; 4.70 m (15 ft 5 in) pressure hull
- Height: 9.60 m (31 ft 6 in)
- Draught: 4.74 m (15 ft 7 in)
- Installed power: 2,800–3,200 PS (2,100–2,400 kW; 2,800–3,200 bhp) (diesels); 750 PS (550 kW; 740 shp) (electric)
- Propulsion: 2 shafts; 2 × diesel engines; 2 × electric motors
- Speed: 17.7 knots (32.8 km/h; 20.4 mph) surfaced; 7.6 knots (14.1 km/h; 8.7 mph) submerged
- Range: 8,500 nmi (15,700 km; 9,800 mi) at 10 knots (19 km/h; 12 mph) surfaced; 80 nmi (150 km; 92 mi) at 4 knots (7.4 km/h; 4.6 mph) submerged
- Test depth: 230 m (750 ft); Crush depth: 250–295 m (820–968 ft)
- Complement: 4 officers, 40–56 enlisted
- Armament: 5 × 53.3 cm (21 in) torpedo tubes (four bow, one stern); 14 × torpedoes or 26 TMA mines; 1 × 8.8 cm (3.46 in) deck gun (220 rounds); 1 x 2 cm (0.79 in) C/30 AA gun

Service record
- Part of: 5th U-boat Flotilla; 29 October 1941 – 30 June 1942; 11th U-boat Flotilla; 1 July 1942 – 1 April 1944
- Identification codes: M 34 321
- Commanders: K.Kapt. Günter La Baume; 29 October 1941 – 1 April 1944
- Operations: 9 patrols: 1st patrol: 16 June – 12 July 1942; 2nd patrol: a. 25 July – 24 August 1942; b. 26 – 29 August 1942; c. 6 – 9 October 1942; d. 11 – 13 November 1942; e. 26 – 29 January 1943; 3rd patrol: 2 February – 6 March 1943; 4th patrol: a. 17 March – 17 April 1943; b. 27 – 29 April 1943; 5th patrol: 6 July – 5 August 1943; 6th patrol: 16 August – 5 September 1943; 7th patrol: 6 – 9 September 1943; 8th patrol: a. 2 – 25 October 1943; b. 27 – 28 Oct 1943; c. 31 October – 2 November 1943; d. 4 – 7 November 1943; e. 20 – 23 March 1944; 9th patrol: 25 March – 1 April 1944
- Victories: 1 merchant ship sunk (5,082 GRT)

German submarine U-355 was a Type VIIC U-boat of Nazi Germany's Kriegsmarine during World War II. The submarine was laid down on 4 May 1940 at the Flensburger Schiffbau-Gesellschaft yard at Flensburg, launched on 5 July 1941, and commissioned on 29 October 1941 under the command of Kapitänleutnant Günter La Baume. After training with the 5th U-boat Flotilla, U-355 was transferred to the 11th U-boat Flotilla, based at Bergen in Norway, for front-line service from 1 July 1942. The boat went missing on 1 April 1944 while on patrol, and was never heard from again. Her fate remains unsolved.

== Design ==
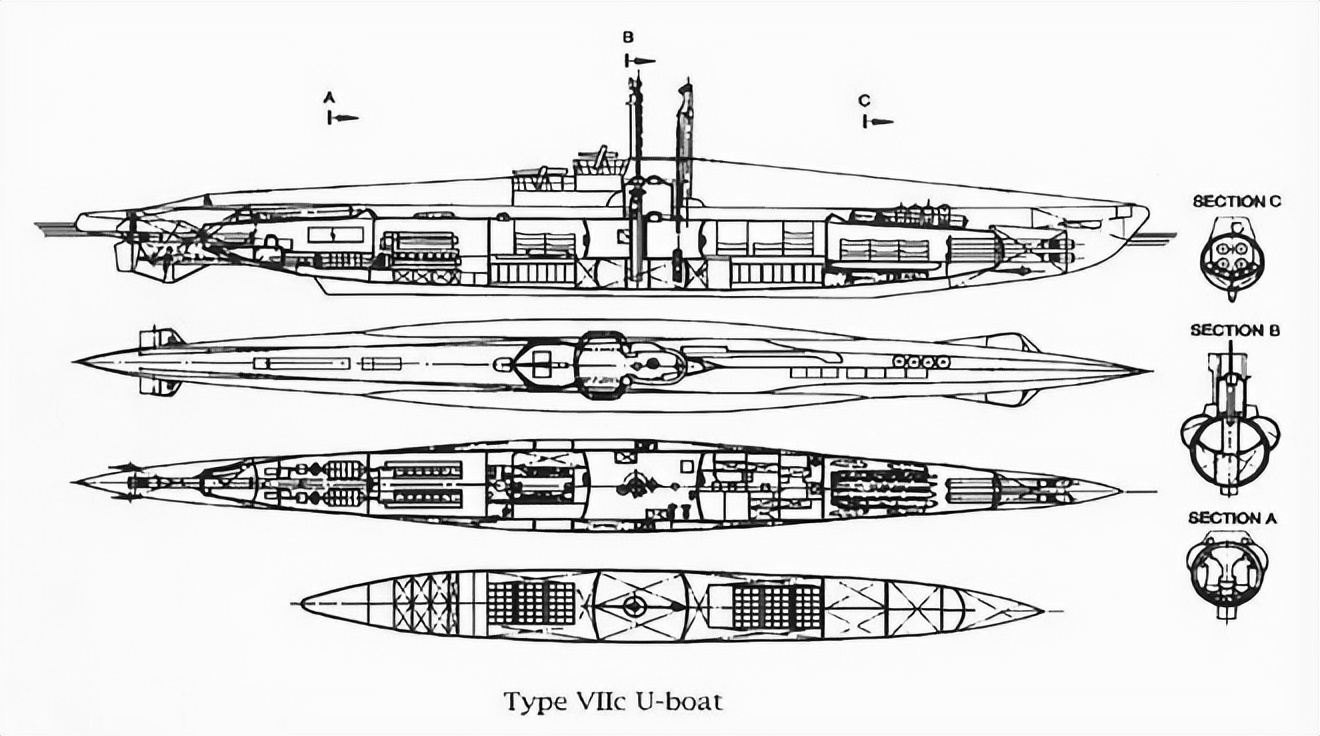
A cross-section of a Type VIIC submarine

German Type VIIC submarines were preceded by the shorter Type VIIB submarines. U-355 had a displacement of 769 tonnes (757 long tons) when at the surface and 871 tonnes (857 long tons) while submerged. She had a total length of 67.10 m (220 ft 2 in), a pressure hull length of 50.50 m (165 ft 8 in), a beam of 6.20 m (20 ft 4 in), a height of 9.60 m (31 ft 6 in), and a draught of 4.74 m (15 ft 7 in). The submarine was powered by two Germaniawerft F46 four-stroke, six-cylinder supercharged diesel engines producing a total of 2,800 to 3,200 metric horsepower (2,060 to 2,350 kW; 2,760 to 3,160 shp) for use while surfaced, two AEG GU 460/8–27 double-acting electric motors producing a total of 750 metric horsepower (550 kW; 740 shp) for use while submerged. She had two shafts and two 1.23 m (4 ft) propellers. The boat was capable of operating at depths of up to 230 metres (750 ft).

The submarine had a maximum surface speed of 17.7 knots (32.8 km/h; 20.4 mph) and a maximum submerged speed of 7.6 knots (14.1 km/h; 8.7 mph). When submerged, the boat could operate for 80 nautical miles (150 km; 92 mi) at 4 knots (7.4 km/h; 4.6 mph); when surfaced, she could travel 8,500 nautical miles (15,700 km; 9,800 mi) at 10 knots (19 km/h; 12 mph). U-355 was fitted with five 53.3 cm (21 in) torpedo tubes (four fitted at the bow and one at the stern), fourteen torpedoes, one 8.8 cm (3.46 in) SK C/35 naval gun, 220 rounds, and a 2 cm (0.79 in) C/30 anti-aircraft gun. The boat had a complement of between forty-four and sixty.

== Service history ==
U-355 was ordered by the Kriegsmarine on 26 October 1939. She was laid down about six months later at the Flensburger Schiffbau-Gesellschaft yard at Flensburg, on 4 May 1940. Just over a year and a month later, U-355 was launched on 5 July 1941. She was formally commissioned later that year on 29 October 1941.

=== Patrols ===
U-355 sailed from Kiel on 1 June 1942, arriving at Skjomenfjord, near Narvik, six days later. She sailed on her first combat patrol ten days later, on 16 June, and headed out into the Barents Sea.

There, on 7 July 1942, she sank the 5,082 GRT British merchant ship SS Hartlebury, dispersed from Convoy PQ 17, en route to Arkhangelsk, carrying six vehicles, 36 tanks, seven aircraft and 2,409 tons of military stores. The ship, hit by three torpedoes, sank within 10 minutes around 17 miles west of Novaya Zemlya. Of the crew, 29 men, seven gunners, and two naval signalmen were killed. The master and 12 men landed at Pomorski Bay, Novaya Zemlya. Another seven survivors took shelter on the American merchant ship SS Winston-Salem, (also of PQ 17), which had run aground and been abandoned on North Gusini Shoal, Novaya Zemlya, and were later rescued by a Soviet survey ship. The U-boat returned to Narvik on 12 July after 27 days at sea.

This was U-355's only success despite sailing on another eight patrols operating against the Arctic convoys between July 1942 and April 1944, totaling 187 days at sea.

=== Fate ===
On 1 April 1944, during her ninth patrol, U-355 reported from approximate position 73°03′N 13°10′E while in pursuit of Convoy JW 58. She was never heard from again, and was listed as missing, together with 52 hands on board, on 4 April 1944.

==== Previously recorded fate ====
U-355 was originally thought to have been sunk in the Barents Sea southwest of Bear Island, Norway at position 73°07′N 10°21′E by HMS Beagle and aircraft from HMS Tracker. The attack was against U-673, inflicting medium damage.

=== Wolfpacks ===
U-355 took part in five wolfpacks, namely:

- Eisteufel (21 June – 9 July 1942)
- Nebelkönig (27 July – 14 August 1942)
- Eisbär (27 March – 15 April 1943)
- Monsun (19 – 21 October 1943)
- Blitz (26 March – 4 April 1944)

== Summary of raiding history ==
Date	Ship Name	Nationality	Tonnage (GRT)	Fate
7 July 1942	Hartlebury	United Kingdom	5,082	Sunk

== Bibliography ==
- Busch, Rainer; Röll, Hans-Joachim (1999). German U-boat commanders of World War II : a biographical dictionary. Translated by Brooks, Geoffrey. London, Annapolis, Md: Greenhill Books, Naval Institute Press. ISBN 1-55750-186-6.
- Busch, Rainer; Röll, Hans-Joachim (1999). Der U-Boot-Krieg, 1939-1945: Deutsche U-Boot-Verluste von September 1939 bis Mai 1945 [German U-boat losses from September 1939 to May 1945] (in German). Vol. IV. Hamburg, Berlin, Bonn: Mittler. ISBN 3-8132-0514-2.
- Gröner, Erich; Jung, Dieter; Maass, Martin (1991). U-boats and Mine Warfare Vessels. German Warships 1815–1945. Vol. 2. Translated by Thomas, Keith; Magowan, Rachel. London: Conway Maritime Press. ISBN 0-85177-593-4.
- Kemp, Paul (1999). U-Boats Destroyed - German Submarine Losses in the World Wars. London: Arms & Armour. ISBN 1-85409-515-3.
- Niestle, Axel (1998). German U-Boat Losses During World War II. Greenhill. ISBN 1-85367-352-8.
