= German submarine U-456 =

German World War II submarine

History

Nazi Germany
- Name: U-456
- Ordered: 16 January 1940
- Builder: Deutsche Werke, Kiel
- Yard number: 287
- Laid down: 3 September 1940
- Launched: 21 June 1941
- Commissioned: 18 September 1941
- Fate: Sunk on 12 May 1943

General characteristics
- Class & type: Type VIIC submarine
- Displacement: 769 tonnes (757 long tons) surfaced; 871 t (857 long tons) submerged
- Length: 67.10 m (220 ft 2 in) o/a; 50.50 m (165 ft 8 in) pressure hull
- Beam: 6.20 m (20 ft 4 in) o/a; 4.70 m (15 ft 5 in) pressure hull
- Height: 9.60 m (31 ft 6 in)
- Draught: 4.74 m (15 ft 7 in)
- Installed power: 2,800–3,200 PS (2,100–2,400 kW; 2,800–3,200 bhp) (diesels); 750 PS (550 kW; 740 shp) (electric)
- Propulsion: 2 shafts; 2 × diesel engines; 2 × electric motors
- Speed: 17.7 knots (32.8 km/h; 20.4 mph) surfaced; 7.6 knots (14.1 km/h; 8.7 mph) submerged
- Range: 8,500 nmi (15,700 km; 9,800 mi) at 10 knots (19 km/h; 12 mph) surfaced; 80 nmi (150 km; 92 mi) at 4 knots (7.4 km/h; 4.6 mph) submerged
- Test depth: 230 m (750 ft); Crush depth: 250–295 m (820–968 ft)
- Complement: 4 officers, 40–56 enlisted
- Armament: 5 × 53.3 cm (21 in) torpedo tubes (four bow, one stern); 14 × torpedoes; 1 × 8.8 cm (3.46 in) deck gun (220 rounds); 1 x 2 cm (0.79 in) C/30 AA gun

Service record
- Part of: 6th U-boat Flotilla; 28 September 1941 – 30 June 1942; 11th U-boat Flotilla; 1 July – 30 November 1942; 1st U-boat Flotilla; 1 December 1942 – 12 May 1943
- Identification codes: M 17 549
- Commanders: Kptlt. Max-Martin Teichert; 18 September 1941 – 12 May 1943
- Operations: 11 patrols: 1st patrol: 31 January – 15 February 1942; 2nd patrol: 24 February – 22 March 1942; 3rd patrol: 29 March – 2 April 1942; 4th patrol: 7 – 20 April 1942; 5th patrol: 29 April – 4 May 1942; 6th patrol: 7 – 12 May 1942; 7th patrol: 25 June - 6 July 1942; 8th patrol: 4 – 10 August 1942; 9th patrol: a. 15 August – 19 September 1942; b. 21 – 27 September 1942; c. 23 November – 4 December 1942; 10th patrol: 14 January – 26 February 1943; 11th patrol: 24 April – 12 May 1943
- Victories: 6 merchant ships sunk (31,528 GRT); 1 merchant ship damaged (6,421 GRT); 1 warship damaged (11,500 tons)

German submarine U-456 was a Type VIIC U-boat built for Nazi Germany's Kriegsmarine for service during World War II. She was laid down on 3 September 1940 by Deutsche Werke in Kiel as yard number 287, launched on 21 June 1941 and commissioned on 18 September 1941 under Kapitänleutnant Max-Martin Teichert.

== Design ==
Type VIIC submarines were preceded by the shorter Type VIIB submarines. U-456 had a displacement of 769 tonnes (757 long tons) when at the surface and 871 tonnes (857 long tons) while submerged. She had a total length of 67.10 m (220 ft 2 in), a pressure hull length of 50.50 m (165 ft 8 in), a beam of 6.20 m (20 ft 4 in), a height of 9.60 m (31 ft 6 in), and a draught of 4.74 m (15 ft 7 in). The submarine was powered by two Germaniawerft F46 four-stroke, six-cylinder supercharged diesel engines producing a total of 2,800 to 3,200 metric horsepower (2,060 to 2,350 kW; 2,760 to 3,160 shp) for use while surfaced, two Siemens-Schuckert GU 343/38–8 double-acting electric motors producing a total of 750 metric horsepower (550 kW; 740 shp) for use while submerged. She had two shafts and two 1.23 m (4 ft) propellers. The boat was capable of operating at depths of up to 230 metres (750 ft).

The submarine had a maximum surface speed of 17.7 knots (32.8 km/h; 20.4 mph) and a maximum submerged speed of 7.6 knots (14.1 km/h; 8.7 mph). When submerged, the boat could operate for 80 nautical miles (150 km; 92 mi) at 4 knots (7.4 km/h; 4.6 mph); when surfaced, she could travel 8,500 nautical miles (15,700 km; 9,800 mi) at 10 knots (19 km/h; 12 mph). U-456 was fitted with five 53.3 cm (21 in) torpedo tubes (four fitted at the bow and one at the stern), fourteen torpedoes, one 8.8 cm (3.46 in) SK C/35 naval gun, 220 rounds, and a 2 cm (0.79 in) C/30 anti-aircraft gun. The boat had a complement of between forty-four and sixty.

== Service history ==
The boat's service began on 28 September 1941 with training as part of the 6th U-boat Flotilla. She was transferred to the 11th flotilla on 1 July 1942 and then to the 1st flotilla on 1 December 1942.

In 11 patrols, she sank six ships for a total of 31,528 gross register tons (GRT), plus two ships damaged.

=== HMS Edinburgh ===
In the late afternoon of 30 April 1942, during the attack on the Arctic Convoy QP 11, two of her torpedoes struck and crippled the Royal Navy light cruiser HMS Edinburgh. At the time, Edinburgh was carrying many tons of gold bullion from the USSR destined for the UK.

=== Wolfpacks ===
She took part in ten wolfpacks, namely:

- Umbau (4–15 February 1942)
- Umhang (10–16 March 1942)
- Eiswolf (29–31 March 1942)
- Robbenschlag (7–14 April 1942)
- Blutrausch (15–19 April 1942)
- Strauchritter (29 April – 3 May 1942)
- Eisteufel (27 June – 5 July 1942)
- Boreas (27–30 November 1942)
- Landsknecht (19–28 January 1943)
- Drossel (29 April – 12 May 1943)

=== Fate ===
In the early morning light U-456 was caught on the surface by an RAF Coastal Command Liberator bomber of 86 Squadron operating out of Northern Ireland. As she circled ahead of convoy HX 237. U-456 dived at once, but not before the aircraft had launched the new American Fido acoustic homing torpedo at the submerged submarine. The aircraft, low on fuel, was unable to press home the attack. U-456 was badly damaged and forced to re-surface. On the following day, she was depth-charged and sank on 12 May 1943 at position 46° 39' N 26° 54' W by HMS Opportune.

== Summary of raiding history ==
Ships sunk or damaged (Note: Merchant ship tonnages are in gross register tons. Military vessels are listed by tons displacement.)
Date	Ship	Flag	GRT	Notes
30 March 1942	Effingham	United States	6,421	Damaged
30 April 1942	HMS Edinburgh	Royal Navy	11,500	Damaged
5 July 1942	Honomu	United Kingdom	6,977	Sunk
22 August 1942	Chalka	Soviet Union	80	Sunk
2 February 1943	Jeremiah Van Rensselaer	United States	7,177	Sunk
3 February 1943	Inverilen	United Kingdom	9,456	Sunk
23 February 1943	Kyleclare	Ireland	700	Sunk
12 May 1943	Fort Concord	United Kingdom	7,138	Sunk

== Bibliography ==
- Gröner, Erich; Jung, Dieter; Maass, Martin (1991). U-boats and Mine Warfare Vessels. German Warships 1815–1945. Vol. II. Translated by Thomas, Keith; Magowan, Rachel. London: Conway Maritime Press. ISBN 0-85177-593-4.
