= German submarine U-255 =

German World War II submarine

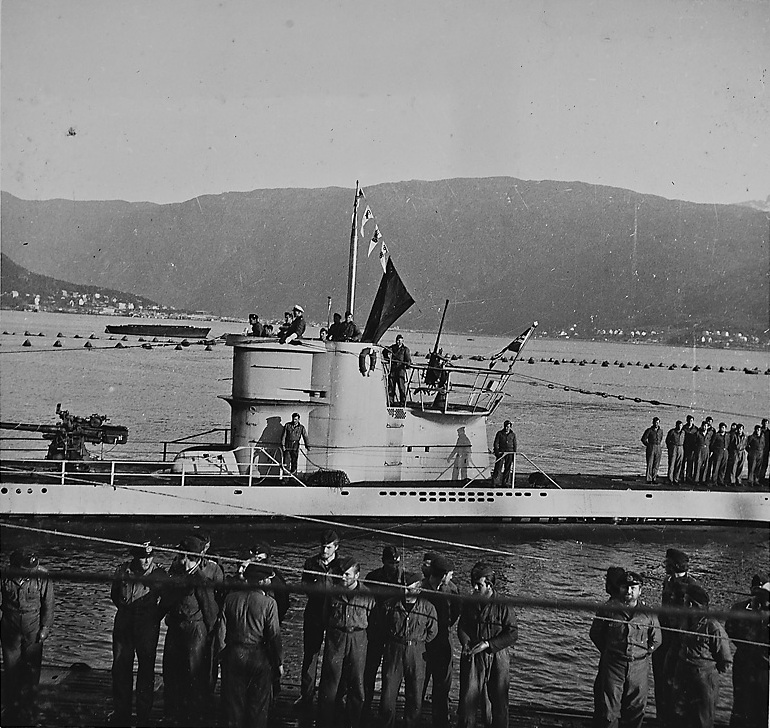
- U-255 at Narvik flying four victory pennants and the flag of the merchant ship SS Paulus Potter after the attack on the ships of Convoy PQ 17

History

Nazi Germany
- Name: U-255
- Ordered: 23 September 1939
- Builder: Bremer Vulkan, Bremen-Vegesack
- Yard number: 20
- Laid down: 21 December 1940
- Launched: 8 October 1941
- Commissioned: 29 November 1941
- Decommissioned: 1 September 1944
- Recommissioned: 2 March 1945
- Fate: Surrendered on 17 May 1945; Scuttled on 13 December 1945 during Operation Deadlight

General characteristics
- Class & type: Type VIIC submarine
- Displacement: 769 tonnes (757 long tons) surfaced; 871 t (857 long tons) submerged
- Length: 67.10 m (220 ft 2 in) o/a; 50.50 m (165 ft 8 in) pressure hull
- Beam: 6.20 m (20 ft 4 in) o/a; 4.70 m (15 ft 5 in) pressure hull
- Draught: 4.74 m (15 ft 7 in)
- Installed power: 2,800–3,200 PS (2,100–2,400 kW; 2,800–3,200 bhp) (diesels); 750 PS (550 kW; 740 shp) (electric)
- Propulsion: 2 shafts; 2 × diesel engines; 2 × electric motors
- Speed: 17.7 knots (32.8 km/h; 20.4 mph) surfaced; 7.6 knots (14.1 km/h; 8.7 mph) submerged
- Range: 8,500 nmi (15,700 km; 9,800 mi) at 10 knots (19 km/h; 12 mph) surfaced; 80 nmi (150 km; 92 mi) at 4 knots (7.4 km/h; 4.6 mph) submerged
- Test depth: 230 m (750 ft); Crush depth: 250–295 m (820–968 ft)
- Complement: 4 officers, 40–56 enlisted
- Armament: 5 × 53.3 cm (21 in) torpedo tubes (four bow, one stern); 14 × torpedoes or 26 TMA mines; 1 × 8.8 cm (3.46 in) deck gun; 2 cm FlaK 30

Service record
- Part of: 8th U-boat Flotilla; 29 November 1941 – 30 June 1942; 11th U-boat Flotilla; 1 July 1942 – 31 May 1943; 13th U-boat Flotilla; 1 June – 30 November 1943; 7th U-boat Flotilla; 1 December 1943 – 1 September 1944; 13th U-boat Flotilla; 1 March – 8 May 1945
- Identification codes: M 47 763
- Commanders: Kptlt. Reinhart Reche; 29 November 1941 – 6 June 1943; Oblt.z.S.d.R Erich Harms; 7 June 1943 – August 1944; Oblt.z.S.d.R Helmuth Heinrich; 2 March – 17 May 1945
- Operations: 15 patrols: 1st patrol: a. 23 June – 15 July 1942; b. 18 – 20 July 1942; 2nd patrol: 4 August – 9 September 1942; 3rd patrol: a. 13 – 25 September 1942; b. 29 September – 3 October 1942; c. 7 – 18 January 1943; 4th patrol: 23 January – 9 February 1943; 5th patrol: 22 February – 15 March 1943; 6th patrol: a. 29 March – 29 April 1943; b. 9 – 16 July 1943; 7th patrol: a. 19 July – 19 September 1943; b. 5 – 13 October 1943; 8th patrol: 26 February – 11 April 1944; 9th patrol: 6 – 8 May 1944; 10th patrol: 6 – 15 June 1944; 11th patrol: 22 – 24 April 1945; 12th patrol: 28 – 30 April 1945; 13th patrol: 2 – 3 May 1945; 14th patrol: 5 – 7 May 1945; 15th patrol: 8 – 19 May 1945
- Victories: 10 merchant ships sunk (47,640 GRT); 1 warship sunk (1,200 tons); 1 merchant ship total loss (7,191 GRT)

German submarine U-255 was a Type VIIC U-boat that served in Nazi Germany's Kriegsmarine during World War II. The submarine was laid down on 21 December 1940 at the Bremer Vulkan yard at Bremen-Vegesack, launched on 8 October 1941 and commissioned on 29 November 1941 under the command of Kapitänleutnant Reinhart Reche.

One of the most successful U-boats to operate in Arctic waters, she operated from Norway during 1942–1943, and then from France in 1944–1945, sailing on 15 combat patrols, sinking ten merchant ships totalling 47,640 GRT and damaging another of 7,191 GRT enough for it to be written off as a total loss. She also sank the 1,200-tons Edsall-class destroyer escort USS Leopold. At the end of the war U-255 surrendered to the British, and was sunk during Operation Deadlight on 13 December 1945.

== Construction ==
U-255 was ordered by the Kriegsmarine on 23 September 1939 and laid down more than a year later on 21 December 1940 at the Bremer Vulkan yard at Bremen-Vegesack as yard number 20. U-255 was launched 8 October 1941, and commissioned on 29 November that same year with Kptlt. Reinhart Reche in command.

== Design ==
German Type VIIC submarines were preceded by the shorter Type VIIB submarines. U-255 had a displacement of 769 tonnes (757 long tons) when at the surface and 871 tonnes (857 long tons) while submerged. She had a total length of 67.10 m (220 ft 2 in), a pressure hull length of 50.50 m (165 ft 8 in), a beam of 6.20 m (20 ft 4 in), a height of 9.60 m (31 ft 6 in), and a draught of 4.74 m (15 ft 7 in). The submarine was powered by two Germaniawerft F46 four-stroke, six-cylinder supercharged diesel engines producing a total of 2,800 to 3,200 metric horsepower (2,060 to 2,350 kW; 2,760 to 3,160 shp) for use while surfaced, two AEG GU 460/8–27 double-acting electric motors producing a total of 750 metric horsepower (550 kW; 740 shp) for use while submerged. She had two shafts and two 1.23 m (4 ft) propellers. The boat was capable of operating at depths of up to 230 metres (750 ft).

The submarine had a maximum surface speed of 17.7 knots (32.8 km/h; 20.4 mph) and a maximum submerged speed of 7.6 knots (14.1 km/h; 8.7 mph). When submerged, the boat could operate for 80 nautical miles (150 km; 92 mi) at 4 knots (7.4 km/h; 4.6 mph); when surfaced, she could travel 8,500 nautical miles (15,700 km; 9,800 mi) at 10 knots (19 km/h; 12 mph). U-255 was fitted with five 53.3 cm (21 in) torpedo tubes (four fitted at the bow and one at the stern), fourteen torpedoes, one 8.8 cm (3.46 in) SK C/35 naval gun, 220 rounds, and one 2 cm (0.79 in) C/30 anti-aircraft gun. The boat had a complement of between forty-four and sixty.

== Service history ==
After a period of training with the 8th U-boat Flotilla, based at Königsberg in the Baltic Sea, U-255 was transferred to the 11th U-boat Flotilla, based at Bergen, Western Norway, for front-line service on 1 July 1942.

=== First patrol ===
On 15 June 1942, U-255 sailed from Kiel, under the command of Kptlt. Reche, arriving at Narvik on the 20th. She then departed on her first patrol on 23 June, sailing into the Barents Sea, north of Russia.

She made her first kill on 6 July, sinking the 7,191 GRT American Liberty ship John Witherspoon about 20 miles (32 km) off Novaya Zemlya. The ship, en route from Baltimore to Arkhangelsk with 8,575 tons of ammunition and tanks aboard, had been a part of Convoy PQ 17 which had dispersed on Admiralty orders in the Barents Sea on 4 July. After being hit by four torpedoes, the ship broke in two, and sank within minutes. The crew abandoned ship, and one seaman fell overboard and drowned. U-255 questioned the survivors, offered food and water, gave directions to the nearest land, and left. The crew were picked up by Royal Navy ships on 9 July.

The next day, 7 July, she sank the 5,116 GRT American Hog Islander Alcoa Ranger, also from Convoy PQ 17. A single torpedo struck the ship, causing the vessel to list heavily to starboard. The crew abandoned ship in three lifeboats within 15 minutes. After she questioned the crew, she began to shell the ship from a distance of about 100 metres (330 ft), firing at least 60 shells (some survivors said as many as 150) until the ship sank. The crewmen were rescued by Soviet patrol boats later that day.

Early on 8 July, U-255 caught another ship from Convoy PQ 17, the 6,069 GRT American merchant ship Olopana, loaded with 6,000 tons of explosives, gasoline, and trucks as deck cargo. A single torpedo hit the ship, blowing out all the bulkheads, and killing seven of the crew. The surviving crewmen abandoned ship on four rafts, as U-255 surfaced and fired 20 shells at the ship, which sank after 20 minutes. U-255 questioned the survivors, gave them a course to land, and asked if they had enough food and water before leaving. The survivors landed at Moller Bay, Novaya Zemlya, two days later.

On 13 July U-255 found the 7,168 GRT Dutch merchant ship Paulus Potter abandoned and drifting, with 2,250 tons of general goods, ammunition, 34 tanks, 15 aircraft and 103 trucks aboard. The ship had been attacked by Ju 88 dive bombers of III./KG 30 east-north-east of Bear Island on 5 July, the day after Convoy PQ 17 dispersed. The crew had abandoned the badly damaged ship, believing it was about to sink. All 76 of the crew had taken five days to reach land at Novaya Zemlya, eventually being rescued by a Soviet whaling vessel. After finding her the II.WO and two mates from U-255 boarded the ship, and attempted to start the engines, but the engine room was flooded. They then searched the vessel, taking blankets, cigarettes, and other useful materials, including confidential documents found on the bridge, and the ship's ensign as a prize, before the ship was sunk with a single torpedo. U-255 returned to Narvik on 15 July.

=== Second patrol ===
U-255 left Narvik on 18 July 1942, arriving at Bergen on the 20th. She sailed from Bergen on 4 August for her second combat patrol, heading deep into Soviet waters, but had no success, although she shelled two Soviet wireless stations as part of Operation Wunderland, before arriving at Neidenfjord on the Norwegian/Finnish border on 9 September.

=== Third patrol ===
U-255 sailed from Neidenfjord on 13 September 1942, patrolling the Barents Sea, with no result, before heading out into the Greenland Sea. There, on 20 September, she attacked the 4,937 GRT American merchant ship Silver Sword, returning from Arkhangelsk to New York City with 5,000 tons of hides and chrome ore and a deck cargo of wood pulp. Hit by two torpedoes, which blew off the stern post, propeller and rudder, and caused the after magazine to explode, the 48 crew and 16 passengers (survivors from PQ 17) abandoned ship in two lifeboats and one raft. The ship was then shelled by the W-class destroyer HMS Worcester and sank. The crew were later picked up by British ships, with one man dying of wounds later.

Three days later, on 23 September, U-255 was attacked by a Catalina patrol aircraft of No. 210 Squadron RAF south of Jan Mayen. After being badly damaged by two depth charges, she was forced to return to Bergen, arriving on the 25th.

=== Refitting and fourth patrol ===
On 29 September 1942 U-255 sailed from Bergen, arriving back at Kiel on 3 October. There the submarine was fitted with a Schnorchel underwater-breathing apparatus before sailing again on 7 January 1943, and arriving at Hammerfest in northern Norway on the 18th.

Returning to her old hunting grounds north of Norway, U-255 sailed from Hammerfest on 23 January 1943, and on the 26th, U-255 likely sank the 2,418 GRT Soviet merchant ship Krasnyj Partizan with two torpedoes west of Bear Island. The Russian ship had just evaded the pursuing U-625 when it went missing. She was probably sunk by U-255 because the submarine recorded a loss the same day. After the sinking of the unknown merchant ship that was likely Krasnyj Partizan, U-255 surfaced and tried to question the survivors. They only spoke Russian and could not be understood. As a result, the crew of U-255 were unable to confirm the identity of the vessel. On 29 January, she sank another Russian freighter, the 1,892 GRT Ufa, south of Bear Island. Both Krasnyj Partizan and Ufa were loaded with timber destined for the United States, and no survivors were found from either ship unless the survivors from the unknown Russian merchant vessel that was sunk by U-255 were indeed crew members of Krasnyj Partizan.

On the afternoon of 3 February, about 600 miles (970 km) northeast of Iceland, U-255 fired a salvo of torpedoes at Convoy RA 52, en route from Murmansk to New York, and hit the 7,460 GRT American merchant ship Greylock. The ship attempted to evade the attack, but was holed below the waterline, immediately flooded, and began to list to starboard. Within fifteen minutes the crew of 61 and nine passengers abandoned ship in four lifeboats. A British escort then shelled and sank the crippled ship. U-255 then arrived back at Narvik on 9 February.

=== Fifth patrol ===
U-255 sailed from Narvik on 22 February 1943 out into the northern seas once more. On 5 March she fired a spread of three torpedoes at Convoy RA 53, sailing from Murmansk to Scotland, and hit two American merchant ships; the 4,978 GRT Hog Islander Executive, loaded with 1,500 tons of potassium chloride, and the 7,191 GRT Liberty ship Richard Bland, carrying 4,000 tons of lumber.

Executive was struck on the starboard side; the explosion demolished the booms, engine, dynamos and all equipment in the immediate area. One hold rapidly flooded and the ship began to settle by the stern. Nine of the crew were killed, the remaining 53 abandoned ship in three lifeboats and a raft. The ship was sunk by gunfire from a destroyer about an hour after the attack.

Richard Bland was struck by a torpedo which did not explode, but passed through the ship, making 8-foot (2.4 m) holes on either side. The ship remained with the convoy, but on the night of 6 March lost contact in gale-force winds and rough seas, and proceeded alone towards Iceland. Five days later, on 10 March, U-255 found the vessel about 35 miles (56 km) off Langanes, Iceland, and hit her with two more torpedoes, breaking the ship in two just forward of the bridge. The crew abandoned ship, and of the total of 69 on board, the master, five officers, 13 crewmen and 15 armed guards were lost, when their lifeboats were swamped in heavy seas. The stern section was torpedoed by U-255 again and sank. U-255 then returned to Narvik, arriving on 15 March.

=== Sixth patrol ===
U-255 sailed from Narvik on 29 March 1943 to patrol the Barents Sea, but had no successes, arriving at Bergen on 29 April. On 1 June 1943, U-255 was transferred to the newly created 13th U-boat Flotilla based at the DORA 1 submarine base at Trondheim.

=== Seventh patrol ===
Under the command of Oberleutnant zur See Erich Harms (the U-boat's former I.WO) from 7 June 1943, U-255 sailed from Bergen on 9 July, arriving at Narvik on the 16th. She left Narvik on 19 July and sailed into Soviet waters, where on 27 July she sank the 411 GRT Russian survey ship Akademik Shokalskij with her deck gun and small arms fire. U-255 established a secret seaplane base on Novaya Zemlya, and returned to Narvik on 19 September after 63 days at sea.

On 1 December 1943 U-255 was transferred again, this time to the 7th U-boat Flotilla, based at Saint-Nazaire in France.

=== Eighth patrol ===
U-255 departed Bergen on 26 February 1944 sailing out into the northern Atlantic between Greenland and Iceland. On 10 March, about 400 miles (640 km) south of Iceland, U-255 located Convoy CU 16, but was detected by sonar by the US Navy destroyer escort Leopold. The ship turned to investigate the contact, but was hit by an acoustic torpedo. The crew abandoned ship, and she sank after several hours. Only 28 survivors were picked up by her sister ship Joyce from her crew of 199. U-255 was hunted by other escorts for three hours, but managed to slip away. On 11 April, the inbound U-boat was caught on the surface with its escort by 15 British Mosquito aircraft. These were in turn attacked by German Ju 88 aircraft. U-255 reached its new home port of St. Nazaire later that day on with only minor damage.

=== Ninth and tenth patrols ===
U-255 made two short patrols in the Bay of Biscay on the 6 – 9 May and 6 – 15 June 1944, but had no successes. U-255 began her ninth patrol on 6 May 1944 when she left St. Nazaire. However she was recalled to her home port after only 2 days fully at sea on 8 May. U-255's tenth patrol was to suffer the same fate as her ninth. She left St. Nazaire on 6 June 1944, (the day of the Normandy landings) and was recalled home on 15 June after only 10 days at sea.

=== 11th-14th patrols ===
Damaged in an air raid in August 1944, U-255 was decommissioned for repairs. She was transferred back to the 13th U-boat Flotilla on 1 March 1945, and recommissioned on 2 March with Oberleutnant zur See Helmuth Heinrich in command. U-255 made a series of four short patrols between St. Nazaire and La Pallice in April and early May 1945 laying mines.

=== 15th patrol ===
U-255 began her final voyage under the command of Oberleutnant zur See Helmuth Heinrich on the day of the German surrender, sailing from St. Nazaire on 8 May 1945 to Loch Alsh in Scotland, arriving there on 19 May to make her formal surrender.

=== Wolfpacks ===
U-255 took part in six wolfpacks, namely:

- Eisteufel (1 – 12 July 1942)
- Nebelkönig (7 – 9 August 1942)
- Nordwind (24 January - 4 February 1943)
- Taifun (2 – 4 April 1943)
- Eisbär (4 – 15 April 1943)
- Preussen (9 – 22 March 1944)

=== Fate ===
U-255 was transferred to Loch Eriboll, and then Loch Ryan on 19 May 1945 for "Operation Deadlight". She was towed out to sea by HMS Cubitt and on 13 December was sunk by Beaufighter aircraft of No. 254 Squadron RAF with RP-3 rockets. in position 51°16′N 13°38′W, south west of Ireland.

== Summary of raiding history ==
During her service in the Nazi Germany's Kriegsmarine, U-255 sank ten commercial ships for 47,640 GRT, one warship of 1,200 tons, and sank another commercial ship for a total loss of 7,191 GRT.

Date	Ship Name	Nationality	Tonnage (Note: Merchant ship tonnages are in gross register tons. Military vessels are listed by tons displacement.)	Fate and location
6 July 1942	John Witherspoon	United States	7,191	Sunk at 72°05′N 40°30′E
7 July 1942	Alcoa Ranger	United States	5,116	Sunk at 71°38′N 49°35′E
8 July 1942	Olopana	United States	6,069	Sunk at 72°10′N 51°00′E
13 July 1942	Paulus Potter	Netherlands	7,168	Sunk at 70°00′N 52°00′E
20 September 1942	Silver Sword	United States	4,937	Sunk at 75°52′N 00°20′W
26 January 1943	Krasnyj Partizan	Soviet Union	2,418	Sunk at 73°45′N 17°30′E
29 January 1943	Ufa	Soviet Union	1,892	Sunk at 73°40′N 24°30′E
3 February 1943	Greylock	United States	7,460	Sunk at 70°52′N 00°21′W
5 March 1943	Executive	United States	4,978	Sunk at 72°44′N 11°27′E
10 March 1943	Richard Bland	United States	7,191	Total loss at 66°53′N 14°10′W
27 July 1943	Akademik Shokalskij	Soviet Union	411	Sunk at Grid AT 3513
9 March 1944	USS Leopold (DE-319)	United States Navy	1,200	Sunk at 58°44′N 25°50′W

== See also ==
- German U-boat bases in occupied Norway

== Bibliography ==
- Busch, Rainer; Röll, Hans-Joachim (1999). German U-boat commanders of World War II : a biographical dictionary. Translated by Brooks, Geoffrey. London, Annapolis, Md: Greenhill Books, Naval Institute Press. ISBN 1-55750-186-6.
- Busch, Rainer; Röll, Hans-Joachim (1999). Der U-Boot-Krieg, 1939-1945: Deutsche U-Boot-Verluste von September 1939 bis Mai 1945 [German U-boat losses from September 1939 to May 1945] (in German). Vol. IV. Hamburg, Berlin, Bonn: Mittler. ISBN 3-8132-0514-2.
- Gröner, Eric; Jung, Dieter; Maass, Martin (1991). German Warships 1815-1945: U-boats and Mine Warfare Vessels. Vol. 2. Translated by Thomas, Keith; Magowan, Rachel. London: Conway Maritime Press. ISBN 0-85177-593-4.
- Bishop, Chris (2006). Kriegsmarine U-Boats, 1939-45. London: Amber Books. ISBN 978-1-904687-96-2.
