= 11th U-boat Flotilla =

- The 11th Flotilla emblem
- Active: Raised May 1942, Dissolved May 1945
- Country: Nazi Germany
- Branch: Kriegsmarine
- Type: U-boat flotilla
- Garrison/HQ: Bergen, Norway
- Engagements: Battle of the Atlantic

Commanders
- Notable commanders: Korvettenkapitän Heinrich Lehmann-Willenbrock

The 11th U-boat Flotilla (German 11. Unterseebootsflottille) was formed on 15 May 1942 in Bergen, Norway. The flotilla operated mainly in the North Sea and against the Russian convoys (JW, PQ, QP and RA series) in the Arctic Sea. The flotilla operated various marks of the Type VII U-boat until September 1944, when it had an influx of some Type IX boats from France. It also was the only flotilla to field the Type XXI U-boat for operational use, but the war ended before U-2511 saw action. The Flotilla was disbanded on 9 May 1945 with the German surrender.

== Flotilla commanders ==
Duration	Commander
May 1942 – December 1944	Fregattenkapitän Hans Cohausz
December 1944 – May 1945	Fregattenkapitän Heinrich Lehmann-Willenbrock
