= List of shipwrecks in February 1945 =

The list of shipwrecks in February 1945 includes ships sunk, foundered, grounded, or otherwise lost during February 1945.

== 1 February ==
List of shipwrecks: 1 February 1945
Ship	State	Description
CH-28	Imperial Japanese Navy	World War II: The No.13-class submarine chaser was bombed and sunk in the Balintang Channel (20°00′N 121°00′E) by North American P-51 Mustang aircraft of the 3rd and 4th Squadrons, 3rd Air Commando Group, United States Army Air Force.
IO 49	Kriegsmarine	The SiebelgefaB landing craft was sunk on this date.
USS PT-77	United States Navy	World War II: The Higgins 78'-class PT boat was shelled by USS Conyngham and USS Lough (both United States Navy) off Talin Point, Luzon, Philippines, and grounded while trying to escape. She was abandoned by her crew that lost one missing.
USS PT-79	United States Navy	World War II: The Higgins 78'-class PT boat was shelled and sunk by USS Conyngham and USS Lough (both United States Navy) off Talin Point, Luzon, Philippines, with the loss of three crew.
T-115	Imperial Japanese Navy	World War II: The No.103-class landing ship was bombed and sunk with all hands in the Balintang Channel (20°00′N 121°00′E) by North Amertican P-51 Mustang aircraft of the 3rd and 4th Squadrons, 3rd Air Commando Group, United States Army Air Force.
USS YC-693	United States Navy	The non-self-propelled open lighter sank in the North Pacific Ocean off the Territory of Alaska.

== 2 February ==
List of shipwrecks: 2 February 1945
Ship	State	Description
CD-144	Imperial Japanese Navy	World War II: The Type D escort ship was torpedoed and sunk east of Cape Laguan, Malaya (04°32′N 104°30′E) by USS Besugo (United States Navy), with the loss of 89 crewmen.
Nanshin Maru No. 19	Japan	World War II: Convoy SASHI-41C: The tanker was torpedoed and sunk south east of Kota Bharu, Malaya (05°40′N 103°17′E) by USS Hardhead (United States Navy), with the loss of 10 crewmen.
Planet	Germany	World War II: The cargo ship struck a mine and sank in the Baltic Sea off Wollin, Pomerania (54°8′N 14°32′E).

== 3 February ==
List of shipwrecks: 3 February 1945
Ship	State	Description
HMT Arley	Royal Navy	World War II: The 130.4-foot (39.7 m) minesweeping naval trawler (304 GRT, 1914) struck a mine in the North Sea and sank under tow off Cromer (53°06′N 01°16′E).
TFA 3	Kriegsmarine	World War II: The Dragen-class torpedo boat was shelled and damaged in the Baltic Sea off the Pomeranian coast by Soviet artillery and was beached at Stolpmünde.
U-1279	Kriegsmarine	World War II: The Type VIIC/41 submarine was depth charged and sunk in the North Sea off Bergen, Norway (61°32′N 1°36′E) by HMS Bayntun and HMS Loch Eck (both Royal Navy) with the loss of all 48 crew.

== 4 February ==
List of shipwrecks: 4 February 1945
Ship	State	Description
USS Barbel	United States Navy	World War II: The Balao-class submarine was bombed and sunk in the Palawan Passage by Japanese aircraft with the loss of all 81 crew.
Hiddensee	Germany	World War II: The tanker was torpedoed and sunk in the Baltic Sea by Shch-318 (Soviet Navy).
HMS MMS 68	Royal Navy	World War II: The MMS-class minesweeper (255/295 t, 1941) was sunk by a mine in the Aegean Sea off Cephalonia, Greece with the loss of 12 crew.
Tairai Maru	Japan	World War II: The cargo ship was torpedoed and sunk in the Yellow Sea by USS Spadefish (United States Navy).
U-1014	Kriegsmarine	World War II: The Type VIIC/41 submarine was depth charged and sunk in the North Channel east of Malin Head, County Donegal, Ireland (55°17′N 6°44′W) by HMS Loch Scavaig, HMS Loch Shin, HMS Nyasaland and HMS Papua (all Royal Navy) with the loss of all 48 crew.

== 5 February ==
List of shipwrecks: 5 February 1945
Ship	State	Description
F 178	Kriegsmarine	World War II: The Type A Marinefährprahm was sunk at Pillau by Soviet aircraft.
Gay Viking	United Kingdom	World War II: The blockade runner, converted from a MGB 502-class motor gun boat (87/103 t, 1941), sank after colliding with the blockade runner Hopewell (United Kingdom).
Henry B. Plant	United States	World War II: Convoy TAM 71: The Liberty ship was torpedoed and sunk in the Strait of Dover by U-245 (Kriegsmarine) with the loss of sixteen of her 70 crew. Survivors were rescued by HMS Hazard and HMS Sir Lancelot (both Royal Navy).
Karatsu	Imperial Japanese Navy	World War II: The riverine gunboat was scuttled as a blockship at Manila, the Philippines.
R-202	Kriegsmarine	World War II: The Type R-151 minesweeper was sunk by an explosion at Arendal, Norway.
SAT 15 Polaris	Kriegsmarine	World War II: The heavy gun carrier was bombed and sunk in the Baltic Sea off Pillau, East Prussia by Soviet aircraft.
Spring Hill	United States	The T2 tanker was run into by the tanker Clio (Panama) at Brooklyn, New York. She caught fire and was abandoned by her crew. Although severely damaged, she was repaired and returned to service.
UJ 307	Kriegsmarine	World War II: The KSK-2-class naval drifter/submarine chaser was bombed and sunk in the Baltic Sea off Pillau by Soviet aircraft. Two crewmen were killed.
Vs 338 Maarten	Kriegsmarine	World War II: The naval drifter/Vorpostenboot was sunk at Pillau by Soviet aircraft.
Vs 339 Prinses Juliana	Kriegsmarine	World War II: The naval drifter/Vorpostenboot was sunk at Pillau by Soviet aircraft.

== 6 February ==
List of shipwrecks: 6 February 1945
Ship	State	Description
Engen Maru	Japan	World War II: Convoy HI-88D: The Standard Type 2A tanker was torpedoed and sunk in the South China Sea 260 nautical miles (480 km) south of Saigon, French Indochina (06°31′N 106°12′E) by USS Pampanito (United States Navy), with the loss of a passenger, nine guards and 29 crewmen.
Everleigh	United Kingdom	World War II: Convoy TBC 60: The cargo ship (5,222 GRT, 1930) was torpedoed and sunk in the English Channel south east of Durlston Head, Dorset (50°29′22″N 1°46′57″W) by U-1017 (Kriegsmarine) with the loss of six of her 56 crew. Survivors were rescued by HMS LCI-33 (Royal Navy).
James Otis	United States	The Liberty ship ran aground on the coast of Devon, United Kingdom and was declared a constructive total loss.
Obi Maru	Japan	World War II: The tanker struck a mine and sank off Singapore.
Peter Silvester	United States	World War II: The Liberty ship was torpedoed and sunk in the Indian Ocean (34°19′S 99°37′E) by U-862 (Kriegsmarine) with the loss of 33 of the 175 people on board. Survivors were rescued by HMS Activity (Royal Navy), Cape Edmont (United States), USS Corpus Christi and USS Rock (both United States Navy).
Shohei Maru	Japan	World War II: The transport ship was torpedoed and sunk in the Yellow Sea by USS Spadefish (United States Navy).

== 7 February ==
List of shipwrecks: 7 February 1945
Ship	State	Description
CD-53	Imperial Japanese Navy	World War II: Convoy HI-93: The Type C escort ship was torpedoed and sunk in the South China Sea off Van Phang Bay, French Indochina(11°053′N 109°22′E) by USS Bergall (United States Navy) with the loss of 109 lives.
Daigyo Maru	Japan	World War II: Convoy HI-88D: The Standard Type 2A tanker (a.k.a. Taigyo Maru) was torpedoed and sunk in the South China Sea 260 nautical miles (480 km) south of Saigon, French Indochina (06°58′N 106°08′E) by USS Guavina (United States Navy), with the loss of five crewmen. Survivors were rescued by Yaku (Imperial Japanese Navy).
HMS MTB 605	Royal Navy	The Fairmile D motor torpedo boat sank after striking a wreck off Ostend, West Flanders Belgium. (Look 17/02/1945)
Okinoyama Maru	Japan	World War II: The cargo ship was torpedoed and sunk in the East China Sea by USS Parche (United States Navy).
Pollux	Germany	World War II: The icebreaker struck a mine and sank in the Baltic Sea off Liepāja, Latvia.

== 8 February ==
List of shipwrecks: 8 February 1945
Ship	State	Description
Eifuku Maru	Imperial Japanese Navy	World War II: The Koto Maru No. 2 Go-class auxiliary gunboat was torpedoed and sunk in the South China Sea off Cape Camau, French Indochina (7°05′N 104°50′E) by USS Pampanito (United States Navy). 335 SNLF Marines and four crewmen were killed.
T-143	Imperial Japanese Navy	The T-103-class tank landing ship was abandoned for unknown reasons south east of the Penghu Islands, Pescadores.

== 9 February ==
List of shipwrecks: 9 February 1945
Ship	State	Description
F 206	Kriegsmarine	World War II: The Type B Marinefährprahm was sunk by Soviet aircraft in the Baltic Sea, possibly after being driven ashore/wrecked by weather. Salvaged and put in Soviet service as BD-393 (Soviet Navy).
HMS Hesperia	Royal Navy	The Bustler-class tugboat (1,118 GRT, 1943) ran aground and sank in the Mediterranean Sea off the coast of Libya.
Kommandøren	Norway	The cargo liner (543 GRT, 1891) ran aground at Flatøy, Norway and sank without loss of line. She was salvaged in March 1945 and towed to Bergen for repairs.
Sivas	Germany	The cargo ship was driven ashore at Askevold, Norway. She had been refloated by June and taken in to Måløy, where she was condemned. Subsequently scrapped.
Sund	Germany	World War II: The coaster struck a mine and sank in the Elbe.
U-864	Kriegsmarine	World War II: Operation Caesar / Action of 9 February 1945: The Type IXD2 submarine was torpedoed underwater and sunk in the North Sea west of Bergen, Norway (60°46′10″N 4°37′15″E) by HMS Venturer (Royal Navy) with the loss of all 73 crew.
U-923	Kriegsmarine	World War II: The Type VIIC submarine struck a mine and sank in Kiel Bay (54°31′N 10°18′E) with the loss of all 48 crew.

== 10 February ==
List of shipwrecks: 10 February 1945
Ship	State	Description
Ammerland	Kriegsmarine	The submarine tender was sunk in a collision off Liepāja, Latvia.
Nordfahrt	Germany	World War II: The cargo ship struck a mine and sank in Kiel Bay. She was refloated in 1946, repaired and entered West German service as Clara Blumenfeld.
S 193	Kriegsmarine	World War II: The Type 1939/40 Schnellboot was sunk in an American air raid on IJmuiden, North Holland, Netherlands.
Steuben	Germany	World War II: The passenger ship was torpedoed and sunk in the Baltic Sea by S-13 (Soviet Navy) with the loss of 3,608 lives. There were 639 survivors.

== 11 February ==
List of shipwrecks: 11 February 1945
Ship	State	Description
USS LST-577	United States Navy	World War II: The landing ship tank was torpedoed and damaged in the Philippine Sea off the east coast of Mindanao, Philippines (08°05′N 126°17′E) by Ro-50 (Imperial Japanese Navy). She was scuttled by USS Isherwood (United States Navy) .
HMS ML 183	Royal Navy	The Fairmile B motor launch (76/86 t, 1941) sank at Dieppe, Seine-Inférieure, France after hitting a pier. Three crew were lost.
Nanshin Maru	Japan	World War II: The cargo ship was torpedoed and sunk in the Strait of Malacca by HMS Tradewind (Royal Navy).
HMS Pathfinder	Royal Navy	World War II: The P-class destroyer (1,640/2,250 t, 1942) was damaged in the Andaman Sea off Ramree, Burma by Japanese aircraft. She was consequently withdrawn from service.
Persier	Belgium	World War II: Convoy BTC 65: The cargo ship was torpedoed and sunk in the English Channel off the Eddystone Lighthouse (50°24′N 4°20′W) by U-1017 (Kriegsmarine) with the loss of twenty of the 51 people on board. Survivors were rescued by Birker Force, Gem (both United Kingdom) and HMS Cornelian (Royal Navy).
Ro-112	Imperial Japanese Navy	World War II: The Ro-100-class submarine was torpedoed and sunk in the Luzon Strait off Camiguin, Philippines (18°53′N 121°50′E) by USS Batfish (United States Navy). Lost with all 61 hands.
U-869	Kriegsmarine	World War II: The Type IXC/40 submarine was depth charged and sunk in the Atlantic Ocean (39°19′48″N 73°12′00″W) by USS Howard D. Crow and USS Koiner (both United States Navy) with the loss of all 55 crew.

== 12 February ==
List of shipwrecks: 12 February 1945
Ship	State	Description
Blairnevis	United Kingdom	The cargo ship collided with HMCS Orkney ( (United Kingdom) Royal Canadian Navy) in the Atlantic Ocean (53°38′N 4°38′W). She was consequently beached on Taylors Bank, in Liverpool Bay and was declared a constructive total loss.
Minenräumschiff 11 Osnabrück	Kriegsmarine	World War II: The mine transport struck two mines and sank in the Baltic Sea off Swinemünde.
M-381	Kriegsmarine	World War II: The Type 1940 minesweeper was sunk off Kristiansand, Norway by HMS Venturer (Royal Navy) or HNoMS MTB 717 (Royal Norwegian Navy).
M-4009	Kriegsmarine	World War II: The 140.8-foot (42.9 m), 362-ton minesweeping naval trawler was scuttled in the River Loire.
Rolandseck	Germany	World War II: The cargo ship was bombed and sunk off Skagen, Denmark by Allied aircraft.
Shinkoku Maru	Japan	World War II: The cargo ship was sunk by air attack.
Unknown motor boats	Kriegsmarine	World War II: Three "Linse" type explosive motor boats were shelled and destroyed by British vessels and shore batteries in Split harbour, Yugoslavia.
V 1106	Kriegsmarine	World War II: The Vorpostenboot struck a mine and sank in the North Sea off Cuxhaven, Lower Saxony.

== 13 February ==
List of shipwrecks: 13 February 1945
Ship	State	Description
HMS Denbigh Castle	Royal Navy	World War II: Convoy JW 64: The Castle-class corvette (1,060/1,590 t, 1944) was torpedoed and damaged in the Barents Sea (69°20′N 33°33′E) by U-992 (Kriegsmarine) with the loss of eleven of her 112 crew. She was beached in Bolshya Volokova Bay but capsized and sank.
Ha-76	Imperial Japanese Navy	World War II: The Type C-class midget submarine flooded and then was scuttled at Dumaguete, Philippines.
Hedwigshütte	Germany	World War II: The cargo ship struck a mine and sank in the Fehmarn Belt off Langeland, Denmark.
Kotoshiro Maru No. 8	Imperial Japanese Navy	World War II: The cargo ship was torpedoed and sunk in the Pacific Ocean west of Japan by USS Sennet (United States Navy).
M 421	Kriegsmarine	World War II: The Type 1940 minesweeper was sunk by a mine off Kolberg, Pomerania.
M 4000 La Quimperoise	Kriegsmarine	The naval trawler/minesweeper was lost on this date.
Ro-113	Imperial Japanese Navy	World War II: The Ro-100-class submarine was torpedoed and sunk in the Luzon Strait off Babayan Island, Philippines (19°10′N 121°25′E) by USS Batfish (United States Navy). Lost with all 59 hands.
Showa Maru No. 3	Imperial Japanese Navy	World War II: The patrol boat was torpedoed and sunk in the Pacific Ocean west of Japan by USS Sennet (United States Navy).
StuBo 1060	Kriegsmarine	The StuBo42 type landing craft/motor launch was sunk on this date.
Tirandantes	Brazil	The cargo ship collided with Albert P. Ryder (United States) and sank off The Guianas.

== 14 February ==
List of shipwrecks: 14 February 1945
Ship	State	Description
CD-9	Imperial Japanese Navy	World War II: The Type C escort ship was torpedoed and sunk in the Yellow Sea west of Cheju Island, Korea (32°43′N 125°37′E) by USS Gato (United States Navy).
Ditmar Koel	Germany	World War II: The cargo ship struck a mine and sank in the Baltic Sea off Swinemünde with the loss of 133 lives.
Hedwigshütte	Germany	World War II: The coaster struck a mine and sank in the Fehmarnbelt with the loss of 43 lives.
Horace Gray	United States	World War II: Convoy BK 3: The Liberty ship was torpedoed and damaged in the Kola Inlet, Soviet Union (69°21′N 33°43′E) by U-968 (Kriegsmarine). There were no casualty, but she was beached at Tyuva Bay (69°11′42″N 33°36′30″E) and was declared a total loss. In 1959, her bow was fitted to Tbilisi (Soviet Union) to enable that ship to be repaired and returned to service following damage sustained on 30 December 1944.
HMS MTB 255	Royal Navy	World War II: The White 73-foot-class motor torpedo boat (40/47 t, 1943) was destroyed by an explosion and fire at a base at Ostend, West Flanders, Belgium.
HMMTB 438 and HMMTB 444	Royal Navy	World War II: The MTB 412-class motor torpedo boats (43/51 t, 1943) were destroyed by an explosion and fire at Ostend.
HMCS MTB 459, HMCS MTB 461, HMCS MTB 462, HMCS MTB 465 and HMCS MTB 466	Royal Canadian Navy	World War II: The BPB 72-foot-class motor torpedo boats (43/51 t, 1944) were destroyed by an explosion and fire at a base at Ostend, Belgium.
HMMTB 776, HMMTB 789, HMMTB 791 and HMMTB 798	Royal Navy	World War II: The Fairmile D motor torpedo boats (90/107 t, 1944) were destroyed by an explosion and fire at a base at Ostend, Belgium.
Norfjell	Norway	World War II: Convoy BK 3: The tanker (8,129 GRT, 1942) was torpedoed and damaged in the Kola Inlet (69°22′N 33°50′E) by U-968 (Kriegsmarine) with the loss of two of her 49 crew. She was beached at Tree Roochia. Later repaired and returned to service.
U-989	Kriegsmarine	World War II: The Type VIIC submarine was depth charged and sunk in the Atlantic Ocean north of the Faroe Islands (61°36′N 1°35′W) by HMS Bayntun, HMS Bratwaite, HMS Loch Dunvegan and HMS Lock Eck (all Royal Navy) with the loss of all 47 crew.
USS YMS-48	United States Navy	World War II: The YMS-1-class minesweeper was damaged by Japanese shore batteries north of Corrigidor, Philippines (14°24′N 120°33′E) and scuttled by USS Fletcher (United States Navy). Three crewmen were killed.
V 1104	Kriegsmarine	World War II: The Vorpostenboot struck a mine and sank in the North Sea off Cuxhaven, Lower Saxony.

== 15 February ==
List of shipwrecks: 15 February 1945
Ship	State	Description
Liseta	Netherlands	World War II: Convoy TAM 80: The tanker was torpedoed and severely damaged in the North Sea off North Foreland, Kent, United Kingdom by the midget submarine U-5361 (Kriegsmarine). Repairs were not completed before the war ended.
U-1053	Kriegsmarine	The Type VIIC submarine sank in Byfjorden, Norway in a diving accident. All 45 crew were lost.

== 16 February ==
List of shipwrecks: 16 February 1945
Ship	State	Description
CD-56	Imperial Japanese Navy	World War II: The Type D escort ship was torpedoed and sunk in the Pacific Ocean 5 nautical miles (9.3 km) east of Mikura Jima, Honshu (33°54′N 139°43′E) by USS Bowfin (United States Navy). She was lost with all 177 hands.
Dieter Hugo Stinnes	Germany	World War II: The cargo ship struck a mine and sank in the Baltic Sea north east of Swinemünde.
Emsstrom	Germany	World War II: The cargo ship was torpedoed by Soviet aircraft and beached off Brüsterort, Pomerania.
Iida Maru	Japan	World War II: The cargo ship was bombed and sunk in Cape Saint Jacques harbour, French Indochina (10°20′N 107°06′E) by a Consolidated B-24 Liberator aircraft of the United States Army Air Forces.
USS LCI(L)-7	United States Navy	World War II: The landing craft infantry (large) was sunk while anchored off the mouth of Mariveles Bay off Mariveles, Luzon, Philippines by Japanese Shin'yō-class suicide motorboats.
USS LCI(L)-26	United States Navy	World War II: The landing craft infantry (large) was sunk while anchored off the mouth of Mariveles Bay off Mariveles by two Japanese Shin'yō-class suicide motorboats. Seventy-six crewmen were killed.
USS LCI(L)-27	United States Navy	World War II: The landing craft infantry (large) was damaged while anchored off the mouth of Mariveles Bay off Mariveles by Japanese Shin'yō-class suicide motorboats. She was beached to prevent sinking. Later refloated, repaired and returned to service. Two crewmen were killed.
USS LCI(L)-49	United States Navy	World War II: The landing craft infantry (large) was sunk off Mariveles by Japanese Shin'yō-class suicide motorboats.
Nariu	Imperial Japanese Navy	World War II: The Sokuten-class minelayer was torpedoed and sunk in the Pacific Ocean west of Japan by USS Sennet (United States Navy).
T-16	Imperial Japanese Navy	World War II: The No.1-class landing ship was attacked by Grumman F6F Hellcat aircraft near Niijima, Izu Islands. Her steering was damaged and she was beached temporarily. There were 23 dead and 71 wounded.
U-309	Kriegsmarine	World War II: The Type VIIC submarine was depth charged and sunk in the North Sea (58°09′N 2°23′W) by HMCS Saint John (Royal Canadian Navy) with the loss of all 47 crew.

== 17 February ==
List of shipwrecks: 17 February 1945
Ship	State	Description
HMS Bluebell	Royal Navy	World War II: Convoy RA 64: The Flower-class corvette (925/1,170 t, 1940) was torpedoed and sunk in the Kola Inlet off Murmansk by U-711 (Kriegsmarine) with the loss off all but one of her 86 crew.
Conte di Cavour	Kriegsmarine	World War II: The Conte di Cavour-class battleship was damaged during an American air raid on Trieste, Italy. She capsized on 23 February. The wreck was scrapped in 1946.
Eifel	Germany	World War II: The cargo ship struck a mine, or was sunk by Soviet aircraft in the Baltic Sea off Liepāja, Latvia. There were 785 dead and 138 survivors.
F 1194, F 1195, F 1198 and F 1199	Kriegsmarine	World War II: The Type D Marinefährprahm were sunk by an air attack at Trieste, Italy.
Hiyoshi Maru No. 2 Go	Imperial Japanese Navy	World War II: The Hiyoshi Maru No. 2 Go-class auxiliary transport was bombed and heavily damaged at Futami, Chichijima (27°05′N 142°11′E) by American carrier-based aircraft. She sank the next day. Five crewmen were killed.
Impero	Kriegsmarine	World War II: The Littorio-class battleship was sunk at Trieste during an American air raid.
USS LCI(G)-474	United States Navy	World War II: The landing craft infantry (large) was sunk off Iwo Jima by Japanese shore batteries. Three crewmen were killed and 18 wounded.
HMS Lark	Royal Navy	World War II: Convoy RA 64: The Black Swan-class sloop (1,350/1,950 t, 1944) was torpedoed and damaged in the Barents Sea north east of Murmansk, Soviet Union (69°30′N 34°33′E) by U-968 (Kriegsmarine) with the loss of three crew. HMS Lark was beached off Rosta and was consequently declared a total loss.
M-421	Kriegsmarine	World War II: The minesweeper struck a mine and sank off Kolberg, Pomerania.
Marie Maersk	Germany	World War II: The tanker was severely damaged in an American air raid on Trieste. She was repaired in 1947 and entered Italian service in 1948 as Luisa.
HMS MTB 605	Royal Navy	The Fairmile D motor torpedo boat (90/107 t, 1942) sank after striking a wreck off Ostend, West Flanders Belgium.
Regent Lion	United Kingdom	World War II: Convoy UGS 72: The tanker (9,551 GRT, 1937) was torpedoed and damaged in the Strait of Gibraltar (35°56′N 5°45′W) by U-300 (Kriegsmarine) with the loss of seven of her 52 crew. Regent Lion was taken in tow by HMT Arctic Ranger and HMS Rollicker (both Royal Navy) but ran aground on Perle Rock. She was declared a total loss.
Russelheim	Germany	World War II: The accommodation ship struck a mine in the Baltic Sea 1 nautical mile (1.9 km) east of Swinemünde. She caught fire, and was beached the next day (53°56′N 14°17′E) She was bombed on 12 March. She had been refloated by February 1947, when she arrived at Ghent, West Flanders, Belgium, for scrapping.
TA41	Kriegsmarine	World War II: The Ariete-class torpedo boat was sunk in an American air raid on Trieste.
TA44	Kriegsmarine	World War II: The torpedo boat (former Navigatori-class destroyer Antonio Pigafetta) was bombed and sunk by American aircraft at Trieste.
Transport No. 154	Imperial Japanese Navy	World War II: The No.101-class landing ship was bombed and sunk off the south coast of Formosa by Consolidated B-24 Liberator aircraft of the United States Fifth Air Force.
Thomas Scott	United States	World War II: Convoy RA 64: The Liberty ship was torpedoed and damaged in the Barents Sea (69°30′N 34°42′E) by U-968 (Kriegsmarine). All 109 crew were rescued by HMS Fencer (Royal Navy). Thomas Scott was taken in tow by M-12 and Zostkij (both Soviet Navy) but later broke in two and sank.
U-425	Kriegsmarine	World War II: The Type VIIC submarine was depth charged and sunk in the Barents Sea off Murmansk (69°39′N 35°05′E) by HMS Alnwick Castle and HMS Lark (both Royal Navy) with the loss of 52 of her 53 crew.
U-1273	Kriegsmarine	World War II: The Type VIIC/41 submarine struck a mine and sank in the Skagerrak (59°24′N 10°28′E) with the loss of 43 of her 51 crew.
Yamashio Maru	Imperial Japanese Army	World War II: The Yamashio Maru-class escort carrier, finished but not yet operational, was bombed and sunk at dock at Yokohama by American carrier-based aircraft. Scrapped in place, 1947.

== 18 February ==
List of shipwrecks: 18 February 1945
Ship	State	Description
Ayukawa Maru	Imperial Japanese Navy	World War II: The auxiliary submarine chaser was shelled and sunk by USS Dortch (United States Navy) on 18 February.
USS Gamble	United States Navy	World War II: The Wickes-class destroyer was bombed and severely damaged off Iwo Jima, Japan by Japanese aircraft. She was taken in to Saipan, Northern Mariana Islands but was not repaired. Scuttled off Apra, Guam on 16 July.
Kyowa Maru No. 3 Go	Imperial Japanese Navy	The auxiliary guard boat was lost on this date.
Shoei Maru	Imperial Japanese Navy	The auxiliary guard boat was lost on this date.
Sperrbrecher 139 Flamingo	Kriegsmarine	World War II: The Sperrbrecher struck a mine and sank off Lindesnes, Norway.
Tolina	Germany	World War II: The cargo ship was sunk in the Baltic Sea by Soviet aircraft.
U-2344	Kriegsmarine	The Type XXIII submarine collided in the Baltic Sea off Rostock, Mecklenburg-Vorpommern (54°16′05″N 11°48′05″E) with U-2336 (Kriegsmarine) and sank with the loss of eleven of her fourteen crew. The wreck was raised in 1956 and scrapped at Rostock in 1958.
U-5097	Kriegsmarine	World War II: The Seehund midget submarine was damaged by depth charges dropped by Royal Navy ships and was run ashore near Egmond aan Zee, Netherlands. Her two crew left it there and she remained in the sand until 2002, when she was recovered and the torpedoes still aboard dismantled and detonated onder controlled circumstances a sea. She can now been seen at the Bunker Museum at IJmuiden.

== 20 February ==
List of shipwrecks: 20 February 1945
Ship	State	Description
Daizen Maru	Japan	World War II: The Type 1K ore carrier was torpedoed and sunk in the South China Sea between Borneo and Singapore (00°42′N 106°18′E) by USS Hawkbill (United States Navy). Forty-eight passengers and 31 crewmen were killed.
Eiyo Maru	Japan	World War II: Convoy HI-90: The Eiyo Maru-class oiler was torpedoed and sunk in the South China Sea 12 nautical miles (22 km) north east of the Cape Padaran Lighthouse (11°55′N 109°20′E) by USS Guavina (United States Navy). Twenty troops, 27 passengers and 33 crewmen were killed.
F 554	Kriegsmarine	World War II: The Type C2 Marinefährprahm was bombed and sunk by American aircraft at Trieste.
F 952	Kriegsmarine	World War II: The minelayer Type D Marinefährprahm was bombed and sunk by American aircraft at Trieste.
IO 50	Kriegsmarine	The SiebelgefaB landing craft was sunk on this date.
Laurana	Kriegsmarine	World War II: The minelayer was sunk in an American air raid on Trieste, Italy.
Nokaze	Imperial Japanese Navy	World War II: The Minekaze-class destroyer was torpedoed and sunk in the South China Sea north of Nha Trang, French Indochina (12°48′N 109°38′E) by USS Pargo (United States Navy) with the loss of 209 of her 230 crew. Survivors were rescued by Kamikaze (Imperial Japanese Navy).
USS S-37	United States Navy	The decommissioned S-class submarine sank in the Pacific Ocean while under tow off San Diego, California.
USS S-38	United States Navy	The decommissioned S-class submarine was sunk as a target by aerial bombing.
TA40	Kriegsmarine	World War II: The Ariete-class torpedo boat was severely damaged in an American air raid on Trieste.
TA48	Kriegsmarine	World War II: The T-class torpedo boat was bombed and sunk by American aircraft at Trieste.
U-1276	Kriegsmarine	World War II: The Type VIIC/41 submarine was depth charged and sunk in the Atlantic Ocean 25 nautical miles (46 km) off Dungarvan (51°48′N 7°07′W) by HMS Amethyst (Royal Navy) with the loss of all 49 crew.
HMS Vervain	Royal Navy	World War II: The Flower-class corvette (925/1,170 t, 1941) was torpedoed and sunk in the Atlantic Ocean 25 nautical miles (46 km) south east of Dungarvan, County Waterford, Ireland (51°47′N 7°06′W by U-1276 (Kriegsmarine) with the loss of 60 of her 94 crew.

== 21 February ==
List of shipwrecks: 21 February 1945
Ship	State	Description
DC 43 Altenbruch	Kriegsmarine	World War II: The guard ship was sunk by a mine in the Elbe Estuary (53°50′N 8°50′E). 15 crew were killed. There were 10 survivors.
Austri	Norway	World War II: The coaster was bombed and sunk at Leirvik, Norway by de Havilland Mosquito aircraft of 235 Squadron, Royal Air Force with the loss of twenty of the 62 people on board.
USS Bismarck Sea	United States Navy	World War II: The Casablanca-class escort carrier was sunk in the Pacific Ocean near Iwo Jima by two Japanese kamikaze aircraft.
Dettifoss	Iceland	World War II: Convoy UR 155: The cargo ship was torpedoed and sunk in the Irish Sea by U-1064 (Kriegsmarine) with the loss of fifteen of her 44 crew. Survivors were rescued by HMS Fusilier (Royal Navy).
F 948D	Kriegsmarine	The MFP-D landing craft was sunk on this date.
Gula	Norway	World War II: The coaster was bombed and sunk at Leirvik, Norway by de Havilland Mosquito aircraft of 235 Squadron, Royal Air Force. Refloated post-war, repaired and returned to service in June 1946.
USS LCT-175	United States Navy	The LCT Mk 5-class landing craft tank sank in a storm off Merir Island, Palau.
Narbo	United States	The cargo ship was driven ashore on Old Providence Island, Colombia and severely damaged. She was refloated and taken in to Mobile, Alabama. Consequently sold for scrapping.
Porto Alegre	Germany	World War II: The cargo ship was bombed and damaged in the Skagerrak by Allied aircraft. She was taken in tow, but sank on 12 March.
Tairiku Maru	Japan	World War II: The cargo ship was torpedoed and sunk in the East China Sea (35°24′N 125°32′E) by USS Gato (United States Navy).

== 22 February ==
List of shipwrecks: 22 February 1945
Ship	State	Description
Alexander Kennedy	United Kingdom	World War II: Convoy BTC 76: The cargo ship (1,113 GRT, 1932) was torpedoed and sunk in the English Channel south east of Falmouth, Cornwall (50°06′N 4°50′W) by U-1004 (Kriegsmarine) with the loss of one of her nineteen crew. Survivors were rescued by Eskwood and Gateshead (United Kingdom).
Blacktoft	United Kingdom	World War II: Convoy FS 1734: The cargo ship (1,109 GRT, 1910) was torpedoed and sunk in the North Sea off the east coast of England by Kriegsmarine Schnellboote.
Goodwood	United Kingdom	World War II: Convoy FS 1734: The coaster (2,780 GRT, 1941) was torpedoed and sunk in the North Sea off Lowestoft, Suffolk (52°53′N 2°12′E) by Kriegsmarine Schnellboote. She was on a voyage from Blyth, Northumberland to London.
HMS LCP(M)-707	Royal Navy	World War II: The landing craft personnel (mortar) (5.9/8.2 t, 1943) was torpedoed and sunk in the Thames Estuary by Kriegsmarine Schnellboote.
HMS LST-364	Royal Navy	World War II: The landing ship tank (1,625/4,080 t, 1942) was torpedoed and sunk off Ramsgate, England 51°18′N 01°54′E by a Kriegsmarine Seehund midget submarine.
Nichiyoku Maru	Japan	World War II: Convoy HI-88H: The oiler was torpedoed and sunk in the South China Sea north east of Nha Trang, French Indochina (11°30′N 109°06′E) by USS Becuna (United States Navy). Thirty-eight gunners and 32 crewmen were killed.
R 4	Kriegsmarine	World War II: The R 2-class minesweeper was sunk in an American air raid on Albona, Adriatic Littoral Zone.
TK-182 Trudyashchiysya Tambora	Soviet Navy	The G-5-class motor torpedo boat was lost on this date.
Tatekawa Maru No. 2	Japan	World War II: Convoy HI-92: The Type 2TL merchant tanker struck a mine and sank in the South China Sea off Cape Padaran, French Indochina (11°08′N 108°44′E).
HMCS Trentonian	Royal Canadian Navy	World War II: Convoy MKS 8: The Flower-class corvette (976/1,348 t, 1943) was torpedoed and sunk in the English Channel off Falmouth, Cornwall (50°06′N 04°50′W) by U-1004 (Kriegsmarine) with the loss of six of her crew.
U-300	Kriegsmarine	World War II: The Type VIIC submarine was depth charged and sunk in the Atlantic Ocean west of Cádiz, Spain (36°29′N 8°20′W) by HMS Evadne, HMS Pincher and HMS Recruit (all Royal Navy) with the loss of nine of her 50 crew.

== 23 February ==
List of shipwrecks: 23 February 1945
Ship	State	Description
CH-35	Imperial Japanese Navy	World War II: Convoy HI-88G: The No.13-class submarine chaser was bombed and sunk off Cape Paderan, French Indochina (11°30′N 109°00′E) by North American B-25 Mitchell aircraft of the 500th Bomb Squadron, 345th Bomb Group, United States Fifth Air Force.
Conte di Cavour	Kriegsmarine	World War II: The Conte di Cavour-class battleship capsized at Trieste, Italy, due to damage suffered during an American air raid on 17 February. The wreck was scrapped in 1946.
Göttingen	Germany	World War II: The cargo ship was torpedoed and sunk west of Nīca, Latvia (56°18′N 20°16′E) by Shch-309 (Soviet Navy) with the loss of over 500 lives.
Henry Bacon	United States	World War II: The Liberty ship straggled behind her convoy. She was torpedoed and sunk in the Norwegian Sea (67°38′N 5°00′E) by Junkers Ju 88 and Heinkel He 111 aircraft of the Luftwaffe's Kampfgeschwader 26. She was the last ship sunk by German aircraft during World War II.
La Combattante	Free French Naval Forces	World War II: The Hunt-class destroyer was damaged by a mine and split in two off Cromer, Norfolk, United Kingdom. Her bow section sank at 53°22′N 01°01′E and her stern at 53°20′N 01°01′E. Sixty-eight crewmen were killed. One hundred and seventeen survivors were rescued by HMS MTB 763 and HMS MTB 770 (both Royal Navy).
Maplefield	United Kingdom	The cargo ship collided with Gateway City (United States) and sank 4 nautical miles (7.4 km) east of the St. Govan Lighthouse, Pembrokeshire. Maplefield was on a voyage from Penmaenmawr, Caernarfonshire to Swansea, Glamorgan.
Nap	Norway	World War II: The boat (86 GRT, 1874) was bombed and sunk at Horten, Norway.
Point Pleasant Park	Canada	World War II: The Park ship (7,136 GRT, 1943) was torpedoed, shelled and sunk in the Atlantic Ocean 500 nautical miles (930 km) north west of Cape Town, South Africa (29°42′S 9°58′E) by U-510 (Kriegsmarine) with the loss of nine of her 58 crew. Survivors were rescued by HMSAS Africana (South African Navy) and the trawler Boy Russell (South Africa).
Sarpen	Kriegsmarine	World War II: The storage hulk, a former Rendell-class gun boat, has sunk at Horten, Norway by Allied aircraft.
V 6733 General Direktor Ballin	Kriegsmarine	World War II: The Vorpostenboot was sunk at Horten, Norway by Allied aircraft.
Yaku	Imperial Japanese Navy	World War II: Convoy HI-88H: The Ukuru-class escort ship was torpedoed and sunk in the South China Sea north-east of Nha Trang, French Indochina (12°44′N 109°29′E) by USS Hammerhead (United States Navy), her captain and 132 crewmen were killed.

== 24 February ==
List of shipwrecks: 24 February 1945
Ship	State	Description
HMS Alert 2	Royal Navy	World War II: The cable layer (941 GRT, 1918) was torpedoed and sunk in the English Channel east of Ramsgate, Kent (51°20′36″N 1°36′48″E) by U-5330 (Kriegsmarine) with the loss of all 59 hands.
Ellen Larsen	Germany	World War II: The cargo ship struck a mine off Warnemünde, Pomerania and was beached. She was a total loss.
HMS Ellesmere	Royal Navy	World War II: The Lake-class whaler (580 GRT, 1939) was torpedoed and sunk in the English Channel north west of Brest, Finistère, France (49°04′N 5°31′W) by U-1203 (Kriegsmarine) with the loss of all 37 hands.
Haukefjell	Germany	World War II: The cargo ship (2,495 GRT, 1921) was bombed and damaged at Hamburg in an Allied air raid. She was declared a total loss.
I-371	Imperial Japanese Navy	World War II: The Type D submarine was torpedoed and sunk in the Bungo Strait (32°40′N 132°33′E) by USS Lagarto (United States Navy) with the loss of all 84 crewmen.
Kuckuk	Kriegsmarine	World War II:The minelayer was sunk at Fiume, Italy by South African Air Force Beaufighters of 19 Squadron. Raised 4 June 1949, repaired and put in Yugoslav commercial service as "Ucka".
Kyuryu Maru	Japan	World War II: The cargo ship struck a mine off Bangkok, Thailand (13°45′N 100°35′E). She was abandoned and scuttled.
M 3618 De Drie Gezusters	Kriegsmarine	The naval drifter/minesweeper was lost on this date.
Oriskany	United Kingdom	World War II: Convoy BTC 78: The cargo ship (1,644 GRT, 1924) was torpedoed and sunk in the Atlantic Ocean west of Land's End, Cornwall by U-1208 (Kriegsmarine) with the loss of all 31 crew.
Santoku Maru No. 2 Go	Imperial Japanese Navy	The auxiliary guard boat was lost on this date.
TA8	Kriegsmarine	World War II: The incomplete TA7-class torpedo boat was sunk in a Royal Air Force raid on Horten, Norway.
Tatsumomo Maru	Japan	World War II: The coaster was torpedoed and sunk in the Pacific Ocean by USS Lagarto (United States Navy).
U-713	Kriegsmarine	World War II: The Type VIIC submarine was depth charged and sunk in the Arctic Ocean north west of Narvik, Norway (69°27′N 4°53′E) by HMS Keppel (Royal Navy) with the loss of all 50 crew.
U-927	Kriegsmarine	World War II: The Type VIIC submarine was depth charged and sunk in the English Channel south east of Falmouth, Cornwall (49°45′N 4°45′W) by a Vickers Warwick aircraft of 179 Squadron, Royal Air Force with the loss of all 47 crew.
U-1208	Kriegsmarine	World War II: The Type VIIC submarine was depth charged and sunk in the English Channel south east of the Isles of Scilly (49°51′N 6°06′W) by HMS Duckworth and HMS Rowley (both Royal Navy) with the loss of all 49 crew.
U-3007	Kriegsmarine	World War II: The Type XXI submarine was bombed and sunk at Bremen with the loss of one crew member.
U-3042	Germany	World War II: The submarine was destroyed in an American air raid on Bremen.
U-3043	Germany	World War II: The submarine was destroyed in an American air raid on Bremen.
U-3052	Germany	World War II: The submarine was destroyed in an American air raid on Bremen.
Uzuki Maru	Japan	World War II: The cargo ship was torpedoed and sunk in the Pacific Ocean by USS Trepang (United States Navy).
Yulin Maru	Japan	The cargo ship (1,893 GRT, 1914) ran aground off Qui Nhon, French Indochina (13°48′N 109°14′E) and sank.

== 25 February ==
List of shipwrecks: 25 February 1945
Ship	State	Description
Aquarius	United Kingdom	World War II: The trawler (187 GRT) struck a mine and sank in the North Sea off the mouth of the Humber.
Egholm	United Kingdom	World War II: Convoy FS 1739: The cargo ship (1,317 GRT, 1924) was torpedoed and sunk in the North Sea south east of Lindisfarne, Northumberland (55°50′N 1°32′W) by U-2322 (Kriegsmarine) with the loss of five of her 26 crew.
Heather Fritzen	Germany	World War II: The cargo ship struck a mine and sank in the Baltic Sea off Warnemünde, Pomerania.
Hosen Maru No. 3	Imperial Japanese Navy	World War II: The guard boat was torpedoed and sunk in the Pacific Ocean by USS Piper (United States Navy).
Hosho Maru No. 3 Go	Imperial Japanese Navy	The auxiliary guard boat was lost on this date.
Koho Maru	Japan	World War II: The coaster was torpedoed and sunk in the South China Sea off Hainan Island, China by USS Bashaw and USS Flasher (both United States Navy).
Seiun Maru No. 5 Go	Imperial Japanese Navy	The auxiliary guard boat was lost on this date.
S 167	Kriegsmarine	The Type 1939/40 Schnellboot collided with S 705 Kriegsmarine and sank in the North Sea. The crew was rescued by other German ships.
Shōnan	Imperial Japanese Navy	World War II: Convoy HI-92: The Ukuru-class escort ship was torpedoed and sunk in the South China Sea south of Yulin, Hainan Island (17°20′N 110°35′E) by USS Hoe (United States Navy). Her captain and 197 crewmen and passengers were killed.

== 26 February ==
List of shipwrecks: 26 February 1945
Ship	State	Description
Arsterturm	Germany	World War II: The cargo ship was torpedoed and sunk by Allied aircraft off Kristiansand, Norway. There were 31 killed and 20 survivors.
Auretta	United Kingdom	World War II: Convoy TAM 91: The cargo ship (4,564 GRT, 1935) struck a mine and sank in the North Sea off the Belgian coast (51°24′06″N 2°49′04″E) with the loss of two of her 49 crew.
Beverwijk	Germany	World War II: The cargo ship was sunk in an Allied air raid on Hamburg. She was refloated in January 1954 and scrapped.
Erika Fritzen	Germany	World War II: The cargo ship struck a mine and sank in the Baltic Sea (54°23′N 11°59′E).
I-368	Imperial Japanese Navy	World War II: The I-361-class submarine was torpedoed and sunk in the Pacific Ocean 35 nautical miles (65 km) west of Iwo Jima (24°43′N 140°37′E) by Grumman TBM Avenger aircraft of Squadron VC-82 from USS Anzio (United States Navy). Lost with all 85 crewmen.
I-370	Imperial Japanese Navy	World War II: The I-361-class submarine was depth charged and sunk in the Pacific Ocean south of Iwo Jima (22°45′N 141°27′E) by USS Finnegan (United States Navy).Lost with all 79 crewmen and 5 Kaiten pilots.
HMS LCA 1161	Royal Navy	The landing craft assault (8.5/11.5 t, 1943) was lost in heavy weather off Leyte, The Philippines.
Nashaba	United States	World War II: Convoy TAM 91: The cargo ship struck a mine in the Scheldt (51°22′03″N 02°55′04″E). She broke her back and sank.
Ro-43	Imperial Japanese Navy	World War II: The Ro-35-class submarine was torpedoed and sunk in the Pacific Ocean 35 nautical miles (65 km) west of Iwo Jima (24°07′N 140°19′E) by a Grumman TBM Avenger of Squadron VC-82 from USS Anzio (United States Navy). Lost with all 79 crewmen.
Zuisho Maru	Japan	World War II: The cargo ship was sunk, or damaged and stranded, by enemy action off Hong Kong (22°10′N 114°10′E). 17 crew were killed.

== 27 February ==
List of shipwrecks: 27 February 1945
Ship	State	Description
Amato Maru	Japan	World War II: Convoy HI-96: The ship was torpedoed and sunk off Cam Ranh Bay, French Indochina (11°56′N 109°18′E) by USS Blenny (United States Navy).
Corvus	Norway	World War II: Convoy BTC 81: The cargo ship (1,317 GRT, 1921) was torpedoed and sunk in the Western Approaches of the English Channel (49°55′N 5°22′W) by U-1018 (Kriegsmarine) with the loss of eight of her 25 crew. Survivors were rescued by Baronscourt United Kingdom) and Wallonia (Sweden).
Kikaku Maru No. 6	Imperial Japanese Navy	World War II: The guard boat was torpedoed and sunk in the East China Sea north of Formosa by USS Scabbardfish (United States Navy).
Omaha	United States	The cargo ship ran aground on the Egret Reef, off Cooktown, Queensland, Australia. She was refloated on 6 March but was declared a total loss.
Oraplana	Denmark	The galeas sailed from Frederikshavn for Copenhagen but disappeared with all hands (4 crew, 2 passengers).
Sampa	United Kingdom	World War II: The Liberty ship (7,219 GRT, 1943) struck a mine and sank in the North Sea off Ostend, West Flanders, Belgium.
Seikan Maru No. 9	Japan	The newly completed train ferry ran aground off Katsuura, Chiba Ken. She was declared a total loss.
U-327	Kriegsmarine	World War II: The Type VIIC/41 submarine was depth charged and sunk in the Western Approaches (49°46′N 5°47′W) by HMS Labuan, HMS Wild Goose and HMS Loch Fada (all Royal Navy) with the loss of all 46 crew.
U-1018	Kriegsmarine	World War II: The Type VII submarine was depth charged and sunk in the Western Approaches (49°55′N 5°22′W) by HMS Loch Fada (Royal Navy) with the loss of 51 of her 53 crew.

== 28 February ==
List of shipwrecks: 28 February 1945
Ship	State	Description
Alcedo	Panama	World War II: Convoy UR 155: The cargo ship was torpedoed and sunk in the Atlantic Ocean off the coast of Iceland (64°07′N 23°17′W) by U-1022 (Kriegsmarine) with the loss of three of her 38 crew. Survivors were rescued by HMT Home Guard (Royal Navy).
Jaspis	Germany	World War II: The cargo ship was severely damaged in an Allied air raid on Kiel. She was subsequently repaired and entered Panamanian service.
Lautaro	Chilean Navy	Lautaro The barque was destroyed when her cargo caught fire in the Pacific Ocean off the coast of Peru.
Norfolk Coast	United Kingdom	World War II: The coaster (646 GRT, 1937) was torpedoed and sunk in the Irish Sea south west of Strumble Head, Pembrokeshire (51°58′N 5°25′W) by U-1302 (Kriegsmarine) with the loss of seven of her thirteen crew.
R-177	Kriegsmarine	World War II: The Type R-151 minesweeper was sunk in the Baltic Sea off Stolp, Pomerania by a mine with the loss of 10 lives.
USAT Soreldoc	United States Army	World War II: The cargo ship was torpedoed and sunk in St. George's Channel (52°15′N 5°35′W) by U-775 (Kriegsmarine) with the loss of fifteen of the 36 people on board. Survivors were rescued by the fishing vessel Loyal Star (United Kingdom).

== Unknown date ==
List of shipwrecks: Unknown date 1945
Ship	State	Description
HMS Alligator	Royal Navy	The Alligator-class tug (395 GRT, 1941) was lost in February.
Consul Cords	Germany	World War II: The coaster struck a mine and sank in the Baltic Sea off Swinemünde, Pomerania between 12 and 17 February.
F 1153	Kriegsmarine	The DM Type Marinefährprahm/minelayer was sunk sometime in February.
HMS LCM 136, HMS LCM 339, HMS LCM 359, HMS LCM 442	Royal Navy	The landing craft mechanized were lost sometime in February.
Nanshin Maru No. 26	Imperial Japanese Navy	World War II: The guard boat was torpedoed and sunk in the Pacific Ocean. Either by USS Threadfin (United States Navy) on 30 January, or by USS Bowfin (United States Navy) on 17 February.
Ro-55	Imperial Japanese Navy	World War II: The Kaichū type submarine was either hedgehogged and sunk off Iba, Zambales (15°27′N 119°25′E) by USS Thomason (United States Navy) with a loss of all 80 crewmen on 7 February, or was torpedoed and sunk in the Pacific Ocean (18°56′N 121°34′E) by USS Batfish (United States Navy) on 10 February.
U-676	Kriegsmarine	World War II: The Type VIIC submarine struck a mine and sank in the Gulf of Finland on or after 12 February with the loss of all 57 crew.
U-683	Kriegsmarine	World War II: The Type VIIC submarine was lost on patrol in the Atlantic Ocean of English Channel on or after 20 February with the loss of all 49 crew.
USS YP-94	United States Navy	The yard patrol boat ran aground either on Chirikof Island, Aleutian Islands, Alaska, or in Tugidak Passage between Tugidak Island and Sitkinak Island. She either ran aground on 17 February and sank the next day or broke in two and sank on 23 February, or ran aground on 23 February and broke in two and sank later.
