= I-370 =

I-370 may refer to:

- Interstate 370, a highway in Maryland, United States
- Isuzu i-370, a pickup truck
- Japanese submarine I-370, an Imperial Japanese Navy submarine commissioned in September 1944 and sunk in February 1945
