= SS Arsterturm =

A number of steamships have been named Arsterturm, including:

- SS Arsterturm (1911), a cargo ship in service 1911–19
- SS Arsterturm (1944), a cargo ship in service 1944–45
- SS Arsterturm (1945), a cargo ship in service 1956–69
