= German submarine U-1022 =

German World War II submarine

- U-995, a U-boat similar to U-1022, at the Laboe Naval Memorial

History

Nazi Germany
- Name: U-1022
- Ordered: 13 June 1942
- Builder: Blohm & Voss, Hamburg
- Yard number: 222
- Laid down: 6 May 1943
- Launched: 13 April 1944
- Commissioned: 7 June 1944
- Fate: Surrendered on 9 May 1945; Sunk on 29 December 1945 during Operation Deadlight

General characteristics
- Class & type: Type VIIC/41 submarine
- Displacement: 759 tonnes (747 long tons) surfaced; 860 t (846 long tons) submerged
- Length: 67.10 m (220 ft 2 in) o/a; 50.50 m (165 ft 8 in) pressure hull
- Beam: 6.20 m (20 ft 4 in) o/a; 4.70 m (15 ft 5 in) pressure hull
- Height: 9.60 m (31 ft 6 in)
- Draught: 4.74 m (15 ft 7 in)
- Installed power: 2,800–3,200 PS (2,100–2,400 kW; 2,800–3,200 bhp) (diesels); 750 PS (550 kW; 740 shp) (electric)
- Propulsion: 2 shafts; 2 × diesel engines; 2 × electric motors
- Speed: 17.7 knots (32.8 km/h; 20.4 mph) surfaced; 7.6 knots (14.1 km/h; 8.7 mph) submerged
- Range: 8,500 nmi (15,700 km; 9,800 mi) at 10 knots (19 km/h; 12 mph) surfaced; 80 nmi (150 km; 92 mi) at 4 knots (7.4 km/h; 4.6 mph) submerged
- Test depth: 230 m (750 ft); Calculated crush depth: 250–295 m (820–968 ft)
- Complement: 44-52 officers & ratings
- Armament: 5 × 53.3 cm (21 in) torpedo tubes (4 bow, 1 stern); 14 × torpedoes; 1 × 8.8 cm (3.46 in) deck gun (220 rounds); 1 × 3.7 cm (1.5 in) Flak M42 AA gun; 2 × 2 cm (0.79 in) C/30 AA guns

Service record
- Part of: 31st U-boat Flotilla; 7 June 1944 – 31 January 1945; 11th U-boat Flotilla; 1 February – 8 May 1945
- Identification codes: M 38 350
- Commanders: Kptlt. Hans-Joachim Ernst; 7 June 1944 – 9 May 1945
- Operations: 1 patrol: 12 February – 1 April 1945
- Victories: 1 merchant ship sunk (1,392 GRT); 1 auxiliary warship sunk (328 GRT)

German submarine U-1022 was a Type VIIC/41 U-boat of Nazi Germany's Kriegsmarine. She was laid down on 6 May 1943 by Blohm & Voss in Hamburg, Germany, and commissioned on 7 June 1944, the day after the Allied landings in Normandy, with Kapitänleutnant Hans-Joachim Ernst in command. She sank two ships for a total of 1,720 GRT. After the war she was handed over to the Allies and sunk in Operation Deadlight.

== Construction and design ==
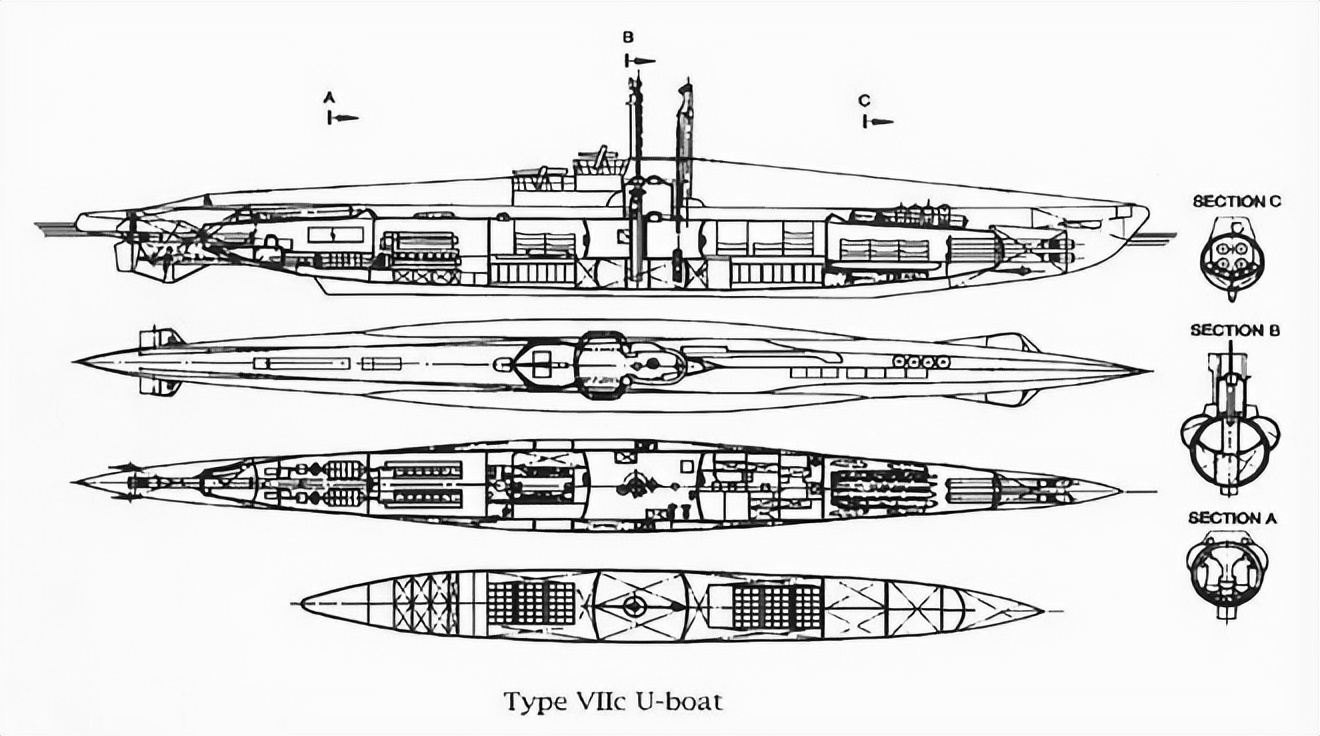
A cross-section of a Type VIIC submarine

German Type VIIC/41 submarines were preceded by the heavier Type VIIC submarines. U-1022 had a displacement of 759 tonnes (747 long tons) when at the surface and 860 tonnes (850 long tons) while submerged. She had a total length of 67.10 m (220 ft 2 in), a pressure hull length of 50.50 m (165 ft 8 in), a beam of 6.20 m (20 ft 4 in), a height of 9.60 m (31 ft 6 in), and a draught of 4.74 m (15 ft 7 in). The submarine was powered by two Germaniawerft F46 four-stroke, six-cylinder supercharged diesel engines producing a total of 2,800 to 3,200 metric horsepower (2,060 to 2,350 kW; 2,760 to 3,160 shp) for use while surfaced, two Brown, Boveri & Cie GG UB 720/8 double-acting electric motors producing a total of 750 metric horsepower (550 kW; 740 shp) for use while submerged. She had two shafts and two 1.23 m (4 ft) propellers. The boat was capable of operating at depths of up to 230 metres (750 ft).

The submarine had a maximum surface speed of 17.7 knots (32.8 km/h; 20.4 mph) and a maximum submerged speed of 7.6 knots (14.1 km/h; 8.7 mph). When submerged, the boat could operate for 80 nautical miles (150 km; 92 mi) at 4 knots (7.4 km/h; 4.6 mph); when surfaced, she could travel 8,500 nautical miles (15,700 km; 9,800 mi) at 10 knots (19 km/h; 12 mph). U-1022 was fitted with five 53.3 cm (21 in) torpedo tubes (four fitted at the bow and one at the stern), fourteen torpedoes, one 8.8 cm (3.46 in) SK C/35 naval gun, (220 rounds), one 3.7 cm (1.5 in) Flak M42 and two 2 cm (0.79 in) C/30 anti-aircraft guns. The boat had a complement of between forty-four and sixty.

== Service history ==
U-1022 was ordered by the Kriegsmarine on 13 June 1942. She was laid down less than one year later at Blohm & Voss, Hamburg on 6 May 1943 . U-1022 was launched from Hamburg on 13 April 1944. She was formally commissioned later that year on 7 June 1944, the day after the Allied landings at Normandy. After her training (during which she travelled from Germany to Norway), U-1022 left her home port of Bergen, Norway on her first and only patrol. During this patrol, which lasted 49 days, U-1022 traveled from Norway to the southern coast of Iceland. In this time span she managed to sink two enemy vessels, the Panamanian steam merchant Alcedo for a loss of 1,392 GRT and the British vessel, HMT Southern Flower for a loss of 328 GRT. U-1022 arrived back in Bergen on 1 April 1945 and remained in port for the remainder of the war. Following Germany's defeat in the war, U-1022 along with most of the remaining German submarine fleet were sunk in Operation Deadlight.

== Summary of raiding history ==
Date	Ship Name	Nationality	Tonnage (GRT)	Fate
28 February 1945	Alcedo	Panama	1,392	Sunk
3 March 1945	HMT Southern Flower	Royal Navy	328	Sunk

== See also ==
- Battle of the Atlantic (1939-1945)

== Bibliography ==
- Busch, Rainer; Röll, Hans-Joachim (1999). German U-boat commanders of World War II : a biographical dictionary. Translated by Brooks, Geoffrey. London, Annapolis, Md: Greenhill Books, Naval Institute Press. ISBN 1-55750-186-6.
- Busch, Rainer; Röll, Hans-Joachim (1999). Deutsche U-Boot-Verluste von September 1939 bis Mai 1945 [German U-boat losses from September 1939 to May 1945]. Der U-Boot-Krieg (in German). Vol. IV. Hamburg, Berlin, Bonn: Mittler. ISBN 3-8132-0514-2.
- Gröner, Erich; Jung, Dieter; Maass, Martin (1991). German Warships 1815–1945, U-boats and Mine Warfare Vessels. Vol. 2. Translated by Thomas, Keith; Magowan, Rachel. London: Conway Maritime Press. ISBN 0-85177-593-4.
