= German submarine U-2322 =

German World War II submarine

- Rendering of a Type XXIII submarine

History

Nazi Germany
- Name: U-2322
- Ordered: 20 September 1943
- Builder: Deutsche Werft, Hamburg
- Yard number: 476
- Laid down: 22 March 1944
- Launched: 30 April 1944
- Commissioned: 1 July 1944
- Fate: Surrendered on 9 May 1945; Sunk as target on 27 November 1945 during Operation Deadlight

General characteristics
- Class & type: Type XXIII submarine
- Displacement: 234 t (230 long tons) surfaced; 258 t (254 long tons) submerged
- Length: 34.68 m (113 ft 9 in)
- Beam: 3.02 m (9 ft 11 in)
- Draft: 3.66 m (12 ft)
- Propulsion: 1 × MWM RS134S 6-cylinder diesel engine, 575–630 metric horsepower (423–463 kW; 567–621 shp); 1 × AEG GU4463-8 double-acting electric motor, 580 metric horsepower (427 kW; 572 shp); 1 × BBC CCR188 electric creeping motor, 35 metric horsepower (26 kW; 35 shp)
- Speed: 9.7 knots (18 km/h; 11 mph) surfaced; 12.5 knots (23 km/h; 14 mph) submerged
- Range: 2,600 nmi (4,800 km; 3,000 mi) at 8 knots (15 km/h; 9.2 mph) surfaced; 194 nmi (359 km; 223 mi) at 4 knots (7.4 km/h; 4.6 mph) submerged
- Test depth: 180 m (590 ft)
- Complement: 14–18
- Armament: 2 bow torpedo tubes; 2 torpedoes

Service record
- Part of: 4th U-boat Flotilla; 1 July – 14 August 1944; 32nd U-boat Flotilla; 15 August 1944 – 31 January 1945; 11th U-boat Flotilla; 1 February – 8 May 1945
- Identification codes: M 41 224
- Commanders: Oblt.z.S. Fridtjof Heckel; 1 July 1944 – 9 May 1945
- Operations: 2 patrols: 1st patrol: 6 February – 3 March 1945; 2nd patrol: 4 – 30 April 1945
- Victories: 1 merchant ship sunk (1,317 GRT)

German submarine U-2322 was a highly advanced Type XXIII U-boat built for Nazi Germany's Kriegsmarine in 1944. U-2322 was one of just a few such boats to undertake an operational patrol, and one of only three to undergo two. During these patrols, she succeeded in sinking a single British freighter, one of five ships sunk by this submarine class.

U-2322 was built at Hamburg in just four months, being ready by July 1944. As a prototype of a new class of boats, she was not ready for active service until 1945, as there were numerous engineering difficulties to contend with and the crew had to be trained to manage the new boat and new operational tactics practised and decided on. When she was finally ready for a war patrol in February 1945, it was more as an experiment into the abilities of the boat than a real attempt to damage allied shipping.

== Design ==
Like all Type XXIII U-boats, U-2322 had a displacement of 234 tonnes (230 long tons) when at the surface and 258 tonnes (254 long tons) while submerged. She had a total length of 34.68 m (113 ft 9 in) (o/a), a beam width of 3.02 m (9 ft 11 in) (o/a), and a draught depth of3.66 m (12 ft). The submarine was powered by one MWM six-cylinder RS134S diesel engine providing 575–630 metric horsepower (423–463 kilowatts; 567–621 shaft horsepower), one AEG GU4463-8 double-acting electric motor electric motor providing 580 PS (430 kW; 570 shp), and one BBC silent running CCR188 electric motor providing 35 PS (26 kW; 35 shp).

The submarine had a maximum surface speed of 9.7 knots (18.0 km/h; 11.2 mph) and a submerged speed of 12.5 knots (23.2 km/h; 14.4 mph). When submerged, the boat could operate at 4 knots (7.4 km/h; 4.6 mph) for 194 nautical miles (359 km; 223 mi); when surfaced, she could travel 2,600 nautical miles (4,800 km; 3,000 mi) at 8 knots (15 km/h; 9.2 mph). U-2322 was fitted with two 53.3 cm (21 in) torpedo tubes in the bow. She could carry two preloaded torpedoes. The complement was 14–18 men. This class of U-boat did not carry a deck gun.

== Service history ==
Leaving Horten Naval Base in Norway on the 6 February 1945, U-2322 proceeded to the East coast of Scotland, particularly in the area of St Abb's Head, where lone coastal shipping sometimes passed, believing that German U-boats would not bother waiting in such a dangerous spot for such insignificant prey. This plan finally worked on the 25 February, when the 1,317 GRT steam merchant Egholm was sunk by a torpedo. This first and only success for U-2322 was achieved in the dark off Holy Island. The rest of this patrol was unsuccessful.

The second patrol, off East Anglia in April was totally fruitless, powerful allied escorts and well-organised convoys effectively cutting off the small U-boats from their potential targets. The only advantage gained in these patrols was that no Type XXIII boat was lost in the North Sea, all losses coming in German waters from indirect sources like accident, bombing raids and naval mines.

When Germany surrendered, U-2322 was at Stavanger in Norway, from where it sailed to Loch Ryan in Scotland for disposal in Operation Deadlight. Towed out to sea on the 27 November, the unmaintained and rusting boat was destroyed as a naval gunnery target.

== Summary of raiding history ==
| Date | Ship Name | Nationality | Tonnage (GRT) | Fate |
|---|---|---|---|---|
| 25 February 1945 | Egholm | United Kingdom | 1,317 | Sunk |

== Bibliography ==
- Busch, Rainer; Röll, Hans-Joachim (1999). German U-boat commanders of World War II : a biographical dictionary. Translated by Brooks, Geoffrey. London, Annapolis, Md: Greenhill Books, Naval Institute Press. ISBN 1-55750-186-6.
- Busch, Rainer; Röll, Hans-Joachim (1999). Deutsche U-Boot-Verluste von September 1939 bis Mai 1945 [German U-boat losses from September 1939 to May 1945]. Der U-Boot-Krieg (in German). Vol. IV. Hamburg, Berlin, Bonn: Mittler. ISBN 3-8132-0514-2.
- Gröner, Erich; Jung, Dieter; Maass, Martin (1991). U-boats and Mine Warfare Vessels. German Warships 1815–1945. Vol. 2. Translated by Thomas, Keith; Magowan, Rachel. London: Conway Maritime Press. ISBN 0-85177-593-4.
- Sharpe, Peter (1998). U-Boat Fact File. Great Britain: Midland Publishing. ISBN 1-85780-072-9.
