= HMS Lark (U11) =

Modified Black Swan-class sloop

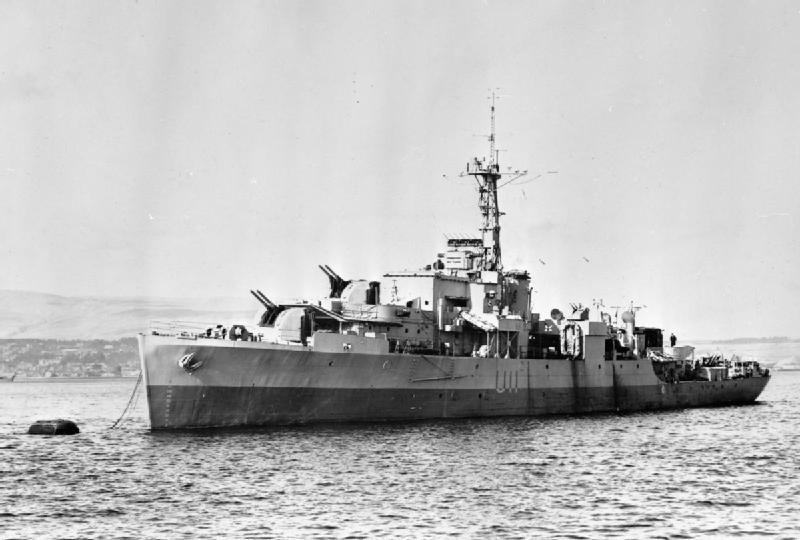
- HMS Lark anchored in 1944.

History

United Kingdom
- Name: Lark
- Namesake: Lark
- Ordered: 27 March 1941
- Builder: Scotts Shipbuilding and Engineering Company, Greenock
- Laid down: 5 May 1942
- Launched: 28 August 1943
- Commissioned: 10 April 1944
- Decommissioned: 17 February 1945
- Identification: Pennant number: U11
- Fate: Handed over to Soviet Navy

Soviet Union
- Name: Neptun
- Namesake: Neptun
- Acquired: June 1945
- Fate: Scrapped in 1956

General characteristics
- Class & type: Modified Black Swan-class sloop
- Displacement: 1,350 tons
- Length: 283 ft (86 m)
- Beam: 38.5 ft (11.7 m)
- Propulsion: Geared turbines; two shafts
- Speed: 20 knots (37 km/h) at 4,300 hp (3,200 kW)
- Complement: 192 men + 1 Cat
- Armament: 6 × QF 4 in Mk XVI anti-aircraft guns; 12 × 20 mm anti-aircraft guns

HMS Lark was a modified Black Swan-class sloop of the Royal Navy. She was laid down by Scotts Shipbuilding and Engineering Company, Greenock on 5 May 1942, launched on 28 August 1943 and commissioned on 10 April 1944, with the pennant number U11.

== Service in Royal Navy ==
Upon completion of her preparations in Tobermory, the Lark was deployed to defend convoys for Western Command.

In May and June 1944, she was part of the 114th Escort Group with the sloop HMS Crane, HMS Blankney, HMS Chelmer and HMS Torrington to escort the assault convoys during the Allied landings in Normandy. during Operation Neptune.

She was assigned to protect arctic convoys (convoys JW 61 to JW 64 and RA 61 to RA 64) to supply the Russian front in Kola Bay.

On 17 February 1945, U-425 was sunk in the Barents Sea east of the Rybatchi Peninsula by depth charges from HMS Lark and HMS Alnwick Castle at the geographic position. The same day, at 10:15 a.m., the German submarine U-968 fired an acoustic torpedo at convoy RA 64 and observed a hit after 6 minutes 20 seconds. In fact, HMS Lark was hit aft northeast of Murmansk so she was towed into Kola Bay and grounded near Rosta.

HMS Lark was unequipped at Rosta because she was unable to return to the UK under tow. In June 1945, the carcass from which most of the equipment was removed was handed over to the Soviet Navy.

== Service in Soviet Navy ==
Postwar reports suggest that she may have later been taken into Russian Navy under the name Neptun, but this has not been proven. It is unlikely that the hull was rebuilt and retooled for further use.
