= German submarine U-1017 =

German World War II submarine

- U-995 Type VIIC/41 at the Laboe Naval Memorial. This U-boat is almost identical to U-1017.

History

Nazi Germany
- Name: U-1017
- Ordered: 23 March 1942
- Builder: Blohm & Voss AG, Hamburg
- Yard number: 217
- Laid down: 19 April 1943
- Launched: 1 March 1944
- Commissioned: 13 April 1944
- Fate: Sunk on 29 April 1945 at 56°04′N 11°06′W by RAF Liberator bomber

General characteristics (VIIC/41)
- Class & type: Type VIIC/41 submarine
- Displacement: 759 tonnes (747 long tons) surfaced; 871 t (857 long tons) submerged
- Length: 67.23 m (220 ft 7 in) o/a; 50.50 m (165 ft 8 in) pressure hull
- Beam: 6.20 m (20 ft 4 in) o/a; 4.70 m (15 ft 5 in) pressure hull
- Height: 9.60 m (31 ft 6 in)
- Draught: 4.74 m (15 ft 7 in)
- Installed power: 2,800–3,200 PS (2,100–2,400 kW; 2,800–3,200 bhp) (diesels); 750 PS (550 kW; 740 shp) (electric)
- Propulsion: 2 shafts; 2 × diesel engines; 2 × electric motors
- Speed: 17.7 knots (32.8 km/h; 20.4 mph) surfaced; 7.6 knots (14.1 km/h; 8.7 mph) submerged
- Range: 8,500 nmi (15,700 km; 9,800 mi) at 10 knots (19 km/h; 12 mph) surfaced; 80 nmi (150 km; 92 mi) at 4 knots (7.4 km/h; 4.6 mph) submerged
- Test depth: 230 m (750 ft); Calculated crush depth: 250–295 m (820–968 ft)
- Complement: 44-52 officers & ratings
- Armament: 5 × 53.3 cm (21 in) torpedo tubes (4 bow, 1 stern); 14 × torpedoes; 1 × 8.8 cm (3.46 in) deck gun (220 rounds); 1 × 3.7 cm (1.5 in) Flak M42 AA gun; 2 × 2 cm (0.79 in) C/30 AA guns

Service record
- Part of: 31st U-boat Flotilla; 13 April – 31 October 1944; 11th U-boat Flotilla; 1 November 1944 – 29 April 1945
- Identification codes: M 03 373
- Commanders: Kptlt. Viktor Graf von Reventlow-Criminil; 13 April – 16 June 1944; Oblt.z.S. Werner Riecken; 17 June 1944 – 29 April 1945
- Operations: 2 patrols: 1st patrol: 28 December 1944 – 2 March 1945; 2nd patrol: 14 – 29 April 1945
- Victories: 2 merchant ships sunk (10,604 GRT)

German submarine U-1017 was a Type VIIC/41 U-boat built for Nazi Germany's Kriegsmarine for service during World War II. She was laid down on 19 April 1943 by Blohm & Voss, Hamburg as yard number 217, launched on 1 March 1944 and commissioned on 13 April 1944 under Kapitänleutnant Victor Graf von Reventlow-Criminil.

== Design ==
Like all Type VIIC/41 U-boats, U-1017 had a displacement of 759 tonnes (747 long tons) when at the surface and 860 tonnes (850 long tons) while submerged. She had a total length of 67.23 m (220 ft 7 in), a pressure hull length of 50.50 m (165 ft 8 in), a beam of 6.20 m (20 ft 4 in), and a draught of 4.74 m (15 ft 7 in). The submarine was powered by two Germaniawerft F46 supercharged six-cylinder four-stroke diesel engines producing a total of 2,800 to 3,200 metric horsepower (2,060 to 2,350 kW; 2,760 to 3,160 shp) and two BBC GG UB 720/8 double-acting electric motors producing a total of 750 metric horsepower (550 kW; 740 shp) for use while submerged. The boat was capable of operating at a depth of 250 metres (820 ft).

The submarine had a maximum surface speed of 17.7 knots (32.8 km/h; 20.4 mph) and a submerged speed of 7.6 knots (14.1 km/h; 8.7 mph). When submerged, the boat could operate for 80 nautical miles (150 km; 92 mi) at 4 knots (7.4 km/h; 4.6 mph); when surfaced, she could travel 8,500 nautical miles (15,700 km; 9,800 mi) at 10 knots (19 km/h; 12 mph). U-1017 was fitted with five 53.3 cm (21 in) torpedo tubes (four fitted at the bow and one at the stern), fourteen torpedoes or 26 TMA or TMB Naval mines, one 8.8 cm (3.46 in) SK C/35 naval gun, (220 rounds), one 3.7 cm (1.5 in) Flak M42 and two 2 cm (0.79 in) C/30 anti-aircraft guns. Its complement was between forty-four and sixty.

== Service history ==
The boat's service career began on 13 April 1944 with the 31st Training Flotilla, followed by active service with 11th Flotilla on 1 November 1944. U-1017 took part in no wolfpacks U-1017 was sunk by depth charges and a FIDO homing torpedo dropped by a RAF Liberator bomber of 120 Squadron on 29 April 1945 in the North Atlantic, NW of Ireland in position 56°04′N 11°06′W.

== Summary of raiding history ==
Date	Ship Name	Nationality	Tonnage (GRT)	Fate
6 February 1945	Everleigh	United Kingdom	5,222	Sunk
11 February 1945	Persier	Belgium	5,382	Sunk

== See also ==
- Battle of the Atlantic

== Bibliography ==
- Busch, Rainer; Röll, Hans-Joachim (1999). German U-boat commanders of World War II : a biographical dictionary. Translated by Brooks, Geoffrey. London, Annapolis, Md: Greenhill Books, Naval Institute Press. ISBN 1-55750-186-6.
- Gröner, Erich; Jung, Dieter; Maass, Martin (1991). German Warships 1815–1945, U-boats and Mine Warfare Vessels. Vol. 2. Translated by Thomas, Keith; Magowan, Rachel. London: Conway Maritime Press. ISBN 0-85177-593-4.
