= SS Horace Gray =

Liberty ship of WWII

History

United States
- Name: Horace Gray
- Namesake: Horace Gray
- Owner: War Shipping Administration (WSA)
- Operator: American Export Lines Inc.
- Ordered: as type (EC2-S-C1) hull, MCE hull 936
- Awarded: 30 January 1942
- Builder: Bethlehem-Fairfield Shipyard, Baltimore, Maryland
- Cost: $1,074,617
- Yard number: 2086
- Way number: 6
- Laid down: 14 December 1942
- Launched: 25 January 1943
- Sponsored by: Mrs. Stephem Zimnavoda
- Completed: 11 February 1943
- Identification: Call sign: KKAE
- Fate: Torpedoed near Kola Inlet and declared a total loss, 14 February 1945

General characteristics
- Class & type: Liberty ship; type EC2-S-C1, standard
- Tonnage: 10,865 LT DWT; 7,176 GRT
- Displacement: 3,380 long tons (3,434 t) (light); 14,245 long tons (14,474 t) (max)
- Length: 441 feet 6 inches (135 m) oa; 416 feet (127 m) pp; 427 feet (130 m) lwl
- Beam: 57 feet (17 m)
- Draft: 27 ft 9.25 in (8.4646 m)
- Installed power: 2 × Oil fired 450 °F (232 °C) boilers, operating at 220 psi (1,500 kPa); 2,500 hp (1,900 kW)
- Propulsion: 1 × triple-expansion steam engine, (manufactured by Ellicott Machine Corp., Baltimore, Maryland); 1 × screw propeller
- Speed: 11.5 knots (21.3 km/h; 13.2 mph)
- Capacity: 562,608 cubic feet (15,931 m^{3}) (grain); 499,573 cubic feet (14,146 m^{3}) (bale)
- Complement: 38–62 USMM; 21–40 USNAG
- Armament: Varied by ship; Bow-mounted 3-inch (76 mm)/50-caliber gun; Stern-mounted 4-inch (102 mm)/50-caliber gun; 2–8 × single 20-millimeter (0.79 in) Oerlikon anti-aircraft (AA) cannons and/or, 2–8 × 37-millimeter (1.46 in) M1 AA guns

SS Horace Gray was a Liberty ship built in the United States during World War II. She was named after Horace Gray, an American jurist who served on the Massachusetts Supreme Judicial Court, and then on the United States Supreme Court, where he frequently interpreted the Constitution in ways that increased the powers of Congress.

== Construction ==
Horace Gray was laid down on 14 December 1942, under a Maritime Commission (MARCOM) contract, MCE hull 936, by the Bethlehem-Fairfield Shipyard, Baltimore, Maryland; she was sponsored by Mrs. Stephem Zimnavoda, and was launched on 25 January 1943.

== History ==
She was allocated to American Export Lines Inc., on 22 February 1943.

On 14 February 1945, at 15:10, while traveling in Convoy BK 3 to Murmansk from Molotovsk, she was struck by a torpedo, fired from U-968, off Kola Inlet. The torpedo struck her on the port side at the bulkhead between holds #4 and #5, blowing the hatch covers off and opening a hole on that side 20 by 60 feet (6.1 by 18.3 m) and a hole 30 by 30 feet (9.1 by 9.1 m) on her starboard side. She had been carrying 2,500 long tons (2,500 t) of potash. Horace Gray began taking on water and settling quickly by the stern. At 15:30, the order was given to abandon ship, as the water had reached the aft deck. The entire crew, consisting of eight officers, two radiomen, and thirty-one unlicensed sailors, in addition to the gun crew of one officer and 27 enlisted seamen, were able to leave the sinking ship on the four lifeboats the ship carried. Two Soviet escort ships were able to pick up the survivors. The master of the Horace Gray, along with some crewmen, were able to reboard her at 16:10. After raising some steam and with the assistance of a Soviet tug they were able to beach her in Tyuva Bay at 69°11′7″N 33°36′5″E. She was declared a CTL two days later. In 1959, Horace Gray's bow was cut off and fitted to her sister ship SS Tbilisi, ex SS John Langdon, which had been torpedoed on 30 December 1944, by U-956, which resulted in her bow breaking off and sinking.

Torpedo attack location: 69°21′N 33°43′E

== Bibliography ==
- "Bethlehem-Fairfield, Baltimore MD". www.ShipbuildingHistory.com. 7 August 2021.
- Maritime Administration. "Horace Gray". Ship History Database Vessel Status Card. U.S. Department of Transportation, Maritime Administration.
- Davies, James (May 2004). "Specifications (As-Built)" (PDF). p. 23.
- "SS Horace Gray".
- "Horace Gray".
- "Tbilisi".
