= USS Finnegan =

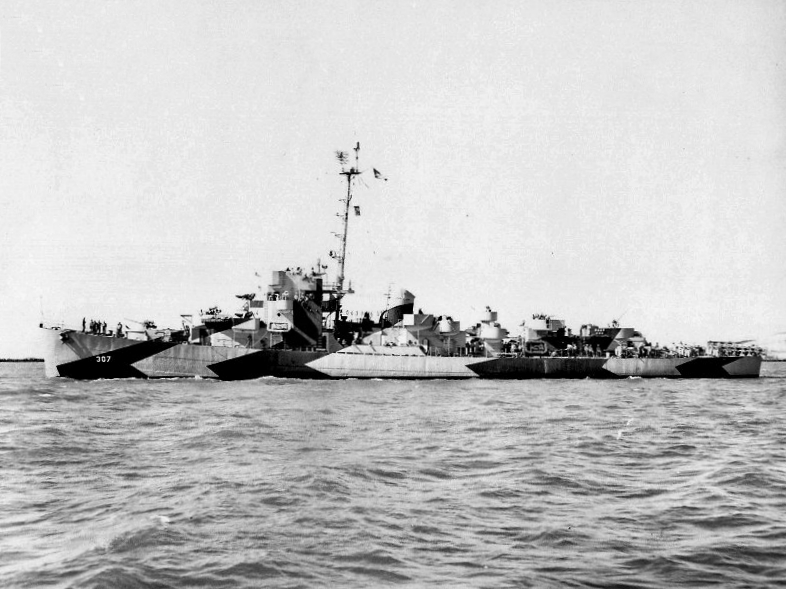
- Finnegan on 24 September 1944

History

United States
- Name: USS Finnegan
- Builder: Mare Island Navy Yard
- Laid down: 5 July 1943
- Launched: 22 January 1944
- Commissioned: 19 August 1944
- Decommissioned: 27 November 1945
- Stricken: 19 December 1945
- Honors and awards: 3 battle stars (World War II)
- Fate: Sold for scrapping, June 1946

General characteristics
- Type: Evarts-class destroyer escort
- Displacement: 1,140 long tons (1,158 t) standard; 1,430 long tons (1,453 t) full
- Length: 289 ft 5 in (88.21 m) o/a; 283 ft 6 in (86.41 m) w/l
- Beam: 35 ft 2 in (10.72 m)
- Draft: 11 ft (3.4 m) (max)
- Propulsion: 4 × General Motors Model 16-278A diesel engines with electric drive, 6,000 shp (4,474 kW); 2 screws
- Speed: 19 knots (35 km/h; 22 mph)
- Range: 4,150 nmi (7,690 km)
- Complement: 15 officers and 183 enlisted
- Armament: 3 × single 3"/50 Mk.22 dual-purpose guns; 1 × quad 1.1"/75 Mk.2 AA gun; 9 × 20 mm Mk.4 AA guns; 1 × Hedgehog Projector Mk.10 (144 rounds); 8 × Mk.6 depth charge projectors; 2 × Mk.9 depth charge tracks

USS Finnegan (DE-307) was an Evarts-class destroyer escort constructed for the United States Navy during World War II. She was sent off into the Pacific Ocean to protect convoys and other ships from Japanese submarines and fighter aircraft. She performed escort and antisubmarine operations in dangerous battle areas and returned home with three well-earned battle stars.

== Design ==
The Evarts-class destroyer escorts were 289 ft 5 in (88.21 m) long overall, and they had a beam of 35 ft 2 in (10.72 m). They had an average draft of 10 ft 1 in (3.07 m) at their full load displacement of 1,416 long tons (1,439 t). Each ship had a normal crew numbered 156 officers and sailors.

Finnegan was propelled by a pair of diesel motors manufactured by General Motors, which drove a pair of screw propellers. Her propulsion system was rated to produce 6,000 brake horsepower (4,500 kW) for a top speed of 19.5 knots (36.1 km/h; 22.4 mph). Oil storage amounted to between 131 and 197 long tons (133 and 200 t), which allowed a cruising radius of up to 6,000 nautical miles (11,000 km; 6,900 mi) at an economical pace of 10 knots (19 km/h; 12 mph).

The ship's armament consisted of a main battery of three 3-inch (76 mm) /50-caliber guns in individual pivot mounts, which could be used against air or surface targets. These were supported by a light anti-aircraft battery that initially consisted of four 1.1 in (28 mm) /75-caliber guns in a quadruple mount and nine 20 mm (0.79 in) Oerlikon guns. For attacks against submarines, the ship was equipped with a Hedgehog mortar, eight depth charge throwers, and two depth charge racks.

== Service history ==
Finnegan was named after William Finnegan, who had been killed during the attack on Pearl Harbor. The ship was launched on 22 February 1944 by Mare Island Navy Yard; sponsored by the namesake's sister. Finnegan was commissioned on 19 August 1944.

Finnegan arrived at Pearl Harbor on 8 November 1944 to serve as escort for submarines conducting training exercises prior to their war patrols. She voyaged to Midway Island escorting a transport between 11 and 20 December, then returned to duty with submarines until 9 January 1945. After amphibious training exercises in the Hawaiian Islands, Finnegan sailed escorting a group of LSTs and submarine chasers, two of which she towed for parts of the passage to Saipan. On 15 February 1945, the escort ship sailed from Saipan for the assault on Iwo Jima, during which she screened transports as they launched their boats for the initial invasion on 19 February.

On 26 February, while escorting empty transports to Saipan, Finnegan made a surface contact by Radarman Robert N. Perry radar, and was detached from the screen to locate and sink the Japanese submarine I-370 in a four-hour attack, in 22°45′N 141°27′E. Radarman Perry was given $50.00 by the Captain for catching the early morning contact. The actual sinking of the submarine was fortuitous. A seaman operating one of the depth charge launchers mistakenly set the detonation depth differently from what was ordered. It was those depth charges that destroyed the submarine.

From Saipan, Finnegan screened the transports on to Espiritu Santo, arriving 15 March 1945. She sailed ten days later for Ulithi, the vast base from which the Okinawa assault was staged, and on 9 April, she reached the newly assaulted island. Sailing on anti-submarine patrols, as well as screening assault shipping, Finnegan fired to drive off a would-be suicide plane on 28 May. On 10 July she departed Okinawa for duty in the Philippines on local escort and patrol assignments until 15 September. Finnegan then sailed for Eniwetok, Pearl Harbor, and Charleston, South Carolina, where she was decommissioned and placed in reserve on 27 November 1945. She was sold for scrapping in June 1946.

== Awards ==
Finnegan received three battle stars for World War II service.
