= HMS Rowley =

Royal Navy frigate

History

United States
- Name: Unnamed (DE-92)
- Ordered: 10 January 1942
- Builder: Bethlehem-Hingham Shipyard, Hingham, Massachusetts
- Laid down: 18 August 1943
- Launched: 30 October 1943
- Completed: 22 December 1943
- Fate: Transferred to United Kingdom 22 December 1943
- Acquired: Returned by United Kingdom 12 November 1945
- Stricken: 8 January 1946
- Fate: Sold for scrapping 14 June 1946

United Kingdom
- Name: HMS Rowley (K560)
- Namesake: Vice Admiral Sir Joshua Rowley (1734-1790), British naval officer who was commanding officer of HMS Montagu during the Battle of Quiberon Bay in 1759
- Acquired: 22 December 1943
- Commissioned: 22 December 1943
- Decommissioned: late 1945
- Identification: Pennant number K560
- Fate: Returned to United States 12 November 1945

General characteristics
- Displacement: 1,400 long tons (1,422 t)
- Length: 306 ft (93 m)
- Beam: 36.75 ft (11.2 m)
- Draught: 9 ft (2.7 m)
- Propulsion: Two Foster-Wheeler Express "D"-type water-tube boilers; GE 13,500 shp (10,070 kW) steam turbines and generators (9,200 kW); Electric motors for 12,000 shp (8,900 kW); Two shafts
- Speed: 24 knots (44 km/h)
- Range: 5,500 nautical miles (10,200 km) at 15 knots (28 km/h)
- Complement: 186
- Sensors & processing systems: SA & SL type radars; Type 144 series Asdic; MF Direction Finding antenna; HF Direction Finding Type FH 4 antenna
- Armament: 3 × 3 in (76 mm) /50 Mk.22 guns; 1 × twin Bofors 40 mm mount Mk.I; 7–16 × 20 mm Oerlikon guns; Mark 10 Hedgehog antisubmarine mortar; Depth charges; QF 2-pounder naval gun

HMS Rowley was a British Captain-class frigate of the Royal Navy in commission during World War II. Originally constructed as a United States Navy Buckley class destroyer escort, she served in the Royal Navy from 1943 to 1945.

== Construction and transfer ==
The ship was laid down as the unnamed U.S. Navy destroyer escort DE-95 by Bethlehem-Hingham Shipyard, Inc., in Hingham, Massachusetts, on 18 August 1943 and launched on 30 October 1943. She was transferred to the United Kingdom upon completion on 22 December 1943.

== Service history ==
She was commissioned into service with the Royal Navy, as the frigate HMS Rowley (K560) on 22 December 1943 simultaneously with her transfer, the ship served on patrol and escort duty. On 27 February 1945, she joined the British frigate HMS Duckworth (K351) in a depth charge attack which sank the German submarine U-1208 in the English Channel southeast of the Isles of Scilly in position 49°51′47″N 006°06′45″W.

The Royal Navy returned Rowley to the U.S. Navy on 12 November 1945.

== Disposal ==
The U.S. Navy struck Rowley from its Naval Vessel Register on 8 January 1946. She was sold on 14 June 1946 for scrapping.
