= German submarine U-425 =

German World War II submarine

History

Nazi Germany
- Name: U-425
- Ordered: 5 June 1941
- Builder: Danziger Werft, Danzig
- Yard number: 126
- Laid down: 23 May 1942
- Launched: 19 December 1942
- Commissioned: 21 April 1943
- Fate: Sunk on 17 February 1945

General characteristics
- Class & type: Type VIIC submarine
- Displacement: 769 tonnes (757 long tons) surfaced; 871 t (857 long tons) submerged
- Length: 67.10 m (220 ft 2 in) o/a; 50.50 m (165 ft 8 in) pressure hull
- Beam: 6.20 m (20 ft 4 in) o/a; 4.70 m (15 ft 5 in) pressure hull
- Height: 9.60 m (31 ft 6 in)
- Draught: 4.74 m (15 ft 7 in)
- Installed power: 2,800–3,200 PS (2,100–2,400 kW; 2,800–3,200 bhp) (diesels); 750 PS (550 kW; 740 shp) (electric)
- Propulsion: 2 shafts; 2 × diesel engines; 2 × electric motors.
- Speed: 17.7 knots (32.8 km/h; 20.4 mph) surfaced; 7.6 knots (14.1 km/h; 8.7 mph) submerged
- Range: 8,500 nmi (15,700 km; 9,800 mi) at 10 knots (19 km/h; 12 mph) surfaced; 80 nmi (150 km; 92 mi) at 4 knots (7.4 km/h; 4.6 mph) submerged
- Test depth: 230 m (750 ft); Crush depth: 250–295 m (820–968 ft)
- Complement: 4 officers, 40–56 enlisted
- Armament: 5 × 53.3 cm (21 in) torpedo tubes (four bow, one stern); 14 × torpedoes; 1 × 8.8 cm (3.46 in) deck gun (220 rounds); 2 × twin 2 cm (0.79 in) C/30 anti-aircraft guns

Service record
- Part of: 8th U-boat Flotilla; 21 April – 31 October 1943; 9th U-boat Flotilla; 1 November – 31 December 1943; 11th U-boat Flotilla; 1 January – 14 September 1944; 13th U-boat Flotilla; 15 September – 17 February 1945
- Identification codes: M 34 178
- Commanders: Kptlt. Heinz Bentzien; 21 April 1943 – 17 February 1945
- Operations: 9 patrols: 1st patrol: 20 – 25 November 1943; 2nd patrol: 28 December 1943 – 2 February 1944; 3rd patrol: a. 6 – 29 February 1944; b. 1 – 8 March 1944; c. 27 April – 1 May 1944; 4th patrol: a. 11 May – 7 June 1944; b. 13 – 14 June 1944; 5th patrol: 18 July – 8 August 1944; 6th patrol: a. 21 – 23 August 1944; b. 29 August – 5 September 1944; c. 6 – 8 September 1944; 7th patrol: a. 11 – 13 September 1944; b. 14 September – 3 October 1944; 8th patrol: a. 15 – 24 October 1944; b. 24 October – 12 November 1944; 9th patrol: 6 – 17 February 1945
- Victories: None

German submarine U-425 was a Type VIIC U-boat of Nazi Germany's Kriegsmarine during World War II.

She carried out nine patrols. She sank no ships.

She was a member of eight wolfpacks.

She was sunk by British warships, near Murmansk on 17 February 1945.

== Design ==
German Type VIIC submarines were preceded by the shorter Type VIIB submarines. U-425 had a displacement of 769 tonnes (757 long tons) when at the surface and 871 tonnes (857 long tons) while submerged. She had a total length of 67.10 m (220 ft 2 in), a pressure hull length of 50.50 m (165 ft 8 in), a beam of 6.20 m (20 ft 4 in), a height of 9.60 m (31 ft 6 in), and a draught of 4.74 m (15 ft 7 in). The submarine was powered by two Germaniawerft F46 four-stroke, six-cylinder supercharged diesel engines producing a total of 2,800 to 3,200 metric horsepower (2,060 to 2,350 kW; 2,760 to 3,160 shp) for use while surfaced, two Siemens-Schuckert GU 343/38–8 double-acting electric motors producing a total of 750 metric horsepower (550 kW; 740 shp) for use while submerged. She had two shafts and two 1.23 m (4 ft) propellers. The boat was capable of operating at depths of up to 230 metres (750 ft).

The submarine had a maximum surface speed of 17.7 knots (32.8 km/h; 20.4 mph) and a maximum submerged speed of 7.6 knots (14.1 km/h; 8.7 mph). When submerged, the boat could operate for 80 nautical miles (150 km; 92 mi) at 4 knots (7.4 km/h; 4.6 mph); when surfaced, she could travel 8,500 nautical miles (15,700 km; 9,800 mi) at 10 knots (19 km/h; 12 mph). U-425 was fitted with five 53.3 cm (21 in) torpedo tubes (four fitted at the bow and one at the stern), fourteen torpedoes, one 8.8 cm (3.46 in) SK C/35 naval gun, 220 rounds, and two twin 2 cm (0.79 in) C/30 anti-aircraft guns. The boat had a complement of between forty-four and sixty.

== Service history ==
The submarine was laid down on 23 May 1942 at the Danziger Werft at Danzig (now Gdansk) as yard number 126, launched on 19 December 1942 and commissioned on 21 April 1943 under the command of Kapitänleutnant Heinz Bentzien.

She served with the 8th U-boat Flotilla from 21 April 1943 for training and the 9th flotilla from 1 November for operations. She was reassigned to the 11th flotilla on 1 January 1944, then the 13th flotilla on 15 September of that year.

=== First patrol ===
U-425's first patrol began with her departure from Kiel on 20 November 1943. Having cleared the Kattegat and Skagerrak, the boat followed the Norwegian coast to Bergen; arriving there on the 25th.

=== Second patrol ===
The submarine criss-crossed the Norwegian and Barents Seas between the North Cape and Bear Island before docking in Hammerfest on 2 February 1944.

=== Third and fourth patrols ===
The boat's third and fourth patrols were relatively uneventful; the latter following short trips from Hammerfest to Bergen, to Narvik. The patrol itself was carried out between Jan Mayen and Bear Islands.

=== Sixth, seventh, eighth and ninth patrols and loss ===
A regular pattern then emerged between Hammerfest and Narvik. Part of her sixth sortie took U-425 as far north and east as the southern end of Novaya Zemlya in the Pechoskoye More.

The boat was sunk by depth charges dropped by the British sloop HMS Lark and the corvette HMS Alnwick Castle near Murmansk on 17 February 1945.

=== Wolfpacks ===
U-425 took part in eight wolfpacks, namely:

- Isegrim (1 – 27 January 1944)
- Werwolf (29 January – 1 February 1944)
- Werwolf (7 – 27 February 1944)
- Trutz (13 May – 6 June 1944)
- Dachs (31 August – 3 September 1944)
- Grimm (15 September – 1 October 1944)
- Panther (17 October – 10 November 1944)
- Rasmus (6 – 13 February 1945)

== Bibliography ==
- Busch, Rainer; Röll, Hans-Joachim (1999). German U-boat commanders of World War II : a biographical dictionary. Translated by Brooks, Geoffrey. London, Annapolis, Md: Greenhill Books, Naval Institute Press. ISBN 1-55750-186-6.
- Busch, Rainer; Röll, Hans-Joachim (1999). Deutsche U-Boot-Verluste von September 1939 bis Mai 1945 [German U-boat losses from September 1939 to May 1945]. Der U-Boot-Krieg (in German). Vol. IV. Hamburg, Berlin, Bonn: Mittler. ISBN 3-8132-0514-2.
- Gröner, Erich; Jung, Dieter; Maass, Martin (1991). U-boats and Mine Warfare Vessels. German Warships 1815–1945. Vol. 2. Translated by Thomas, Keith; Magowan, Rachel. London: Conway Maritime Press. ISBN 0-85177-593-4.
- Kemp, Paul (1999). U-Boats Destroyed – German Submarine Losses in the World Wars. London: Arms & Armour. ISBN 1-85409-515-3.
