= German submarine U-968 =

German World War II submarine

History

Nazi Germany
- Name: U-968
- Ordered: 5 June 1941
- Builder: Blohm & Voss, Hamburg
- Yard number: 168
- Laid down: 14 May 1942
- Launched: 4 February 1943
- Commissioned: 18 March 1943
- Fate: Surrendered on 9 May 1945; sunk as part of Operation Deadlight on 29 November 1945

General characteristics
- Class & type: Type VIIC submarine
- Displacement: 769 tonnes (757 long tons) surfaced; 871 t (857 long tons) submerged
- Length: 67.10 m (220 ft 2 in) o/a; 50.50 m (165 ft 8 in) pressure hull
- Beam: 6.20 m (20 ft 4 in) o/a; 4.70 m (15 ft 5 in) pressure hull
- Height: 9.60 m (31 ft 6 in)
- Draught: 4.74 m (15 ft 7 in)
- Installed power: 2,800–3,200 PS (2,100–2,400 kW; 2,800–3,200 bhp) (diesels); 750 PS (550 kW; 740 shp) (electric)
- Propulsion: 2 shafts; 2 × diesel engines; 2 × electric motors
- Speed: 17.7 knots (32.8 km/h; 20.4 mph) surfaced; 7.6 knots (14.1 km/h; 8.7 mph) submerged
- Range: 8,500 nmi (15,700 km; 9,800 mi) at 10 knots (19 km/h; 12 mph) surfaced; 80 nmi (150 km; 92 mi) at 4 knots (7.4 km/h; 4.6 mph) submerged
- Test depth: 230 m (750 ft); Crush depth: 250–295 m (820–968 ft)
- Complement: 4 officers, 40–56 enlisted
- Armament: 5 × 53.3 cm (21 in) torpedo tubes (four bow, one stern); 14 × torpedoes or 26 TMA mines; 1 × 8.8 cm (3.46 in) deck gun (220 rounds); 1 × twin 2 cm (0.79 in) C/30 anti-aircraft gun

Service record
- Part of: 5th U-boat Flotilla; 18 March 1943 – 29 February 1944; 13th U-boat Flotilla; 1 March 1944 – 8 May 1945
- Identification codes: M 51 536
- Commanders: Oblt.z.S. Otto Westphalen; 18 March 1943 – 9 May 1945
- Operations: 7 patrols: 1st patrol: a. 7 March – 2 April 1944; b. 4 – 6 April 1944; c. 11 – 14 July 1944; d. 17 – 21 July 1944; e. 20 – 22 August 1944; 2nd patrol: 29 August – 10 September 1944; 3rd patrol: 24 September – 3 October 1944; 4th patrol: a. 14 October – 11 November 1944; b. 13 – 16 November 1944; c. 23 – 25 January 1945; d. 1 February 1945; 5th patrol: 7 – 20 February 1945; 6th patrol: 12 – 30 March 1945; 7th patrol: a. 21 April – 6 May 1945; b. 7 May 1945; c. 15 – 19 May 1945
- Victories: 2 merchant ships sunk (14,386 GRT); 1 warship sunk (1,350 tons); 1 merchant ship total loss (7,200 GRT); 1 warship total loss (1,350 tons); 1 merchant ship damaged (8,129 GRT)

German submarine U-968 was a Type VIIC U-boat built for Nazi Germany's Kriegsmarine for service during World War II. She was laid down on 14 May 1942 by Blohm & Voss, Hamburg as yard number 168, launched on 4 February 1943 and commissioned on 18 March 1943 under Oberleutnant zur See Otto Westphalen.

== Design ==
German Type VIIC submarines were preceded by the shorter Type VIIB submarines. U-968 had a displacement of 769 tonnes (757 long tons) when at the surface and 871 tonnes (857 long tons) while submerged. She had a total length of 67.10 m (220 ft 2 in), a pressure hull length of 50.50 m (165 ft 8 in), a beam of 6.20 m (20 ft 4 in), a height of 9.60 m (31 ft 6 in), and a draught of 4.74 m (15 ft 7 in). The submarine was powered by two Germaniawerft F46 four-stroke, six-cylinder supercharged diesel engines producing a total of 2,800 to 3,200 metric horsepower (2,060 to 2,350 kW; 2,760 to 3,160 shp) for use while surfaced, two Brown, Boveri & Cie GG UB 720/8 double-acting electric motors producing a total of 750 metric horsepower (550 kW; 740 shp) for use while submerged. She had two shafts and two 1.23 m (4 ft) propellers. The boat was capable of operating at depths of up to 230 metres (750 ft).

The submarine had a maximum surface speed of 17.7 knots (32.8 km/h; 20.4 mph) and a maximum submerged speed of 7.6 knots (14.1 km/h; 8.7 mph). When submerged, the boat could operate for 80 nautical miles (150 km; 92 mi) at 4 knots (7.4 km/h; 4.6 mph); when surfaced, she could travel 8,500 nautical miles (15,700 km; 9,800 mi) at 10 knots (19 km/h; 12 mph). U-968 was fitted with five 53.3 cm (21 in) torpedo tubes (four fitted at the bow and one at the stern), fourteen torpedoes, one 8.8 cm (3.46 in) SK C/35 naval gun, 220 rounds, and one twin 2 cm (0.79 in) C/30 anti-aircraft gun. The boat had a complement of between forty-four and sixty.

== Service history ==
The boat's career began with training at 5th U-boat Flotilla on 18 March 1943, followed by active service on 1 March 1944 as part of the 13th Flotilla for the remainder of her service.

In seven patrols she sank two merchant ships, for a total of 14,386 gross register tons (GRT), damaged one other.

=== Wolfpacks ===
U-968 took part in seven wolfpacks, namely:

- Hammer (17 March – 1 April 1944)
- Dachs (1 – 5 September 1944)
- Zorn (26 September – 1 October 1944)
- Grimm (1 – 2 October 1944)
- Panther (16 October – 10 November 1944)
- Rasmus (7 – 13 February 1945)
- Hagen (13 – 21 March 1945)

=== Fate ===
U-968 surrendered on 9 May 1945 at Narvik, Norway. She was subsequently transferred to Loch Eriboll in Scotland on 19 May 1945, and later to Loch Ryan as part of Operation Deadlight. She was eventually sunk by Allied forces on 29 November 1945 in the North Atlantic in position 55°24′N 06°22′W.

== Summary of raiding history ==
Date	Ship Name	Nationality	Tonnage (Note: Merchant ship tonnages are in gross register tons. Military vessels are listed by tons displacement.)	Fate
14 February 1945	Norfjell	Norway	8,129	Damaged
14 February 1945	Horace Gray	United States	7,200	Total loss
17 February 1945	HMS Lark	Royal Navy	1,350	Total loss
17 February 1945	Thomas Scott	United States	7,176	Sunk
20 March 1945	Thomas Donaldson	United States	7,210	Sunk
20 March 1945	HMS Lapwing	Royal Navy	1,350	Sunk

== Bibliography ==
- Busch, Rainer; Röll, Hans-Joachim (1999). German U-boat commanders of World War II : a biographical dictionary. Translated by Brooks, Geoffrey. London, Annapolis, Md: Greenhill Books, Naval Institute Press. ISBN 1-55750-186-6.
- Busch, Rainer; Röll, Hans-Joachim (1999). Der U-Boot-Krieg, 1939-1945: Deutsche U-Boot-Verluste von September 1939 bis Mai 1945 [German U-boat losses from September 1939 to May 1945] (in German). Vol. IV. Hamburg, Berlin, Bonn: Mittler. ISBN 3-8132-0514-2.
- Gröner, Erich; Jung, Dieter; Maass, Martin (1991). U-boats and Mine Warfare Vessels. German Warships 1815–1945. Vol. 2. Translated by Thomas, Keith; Magowan, Rachel. London: Conway Maritime Press. ISBN 0-85177-593-4.
- Sharpe, Peter (1998). U-Boat Fact File. Great Britain: Midland Publishing. ISBN 1-85780-072-9.
