= SS Persier (1918) =

British ship sunk in Plymouth Sound in 1945. Now a dive site

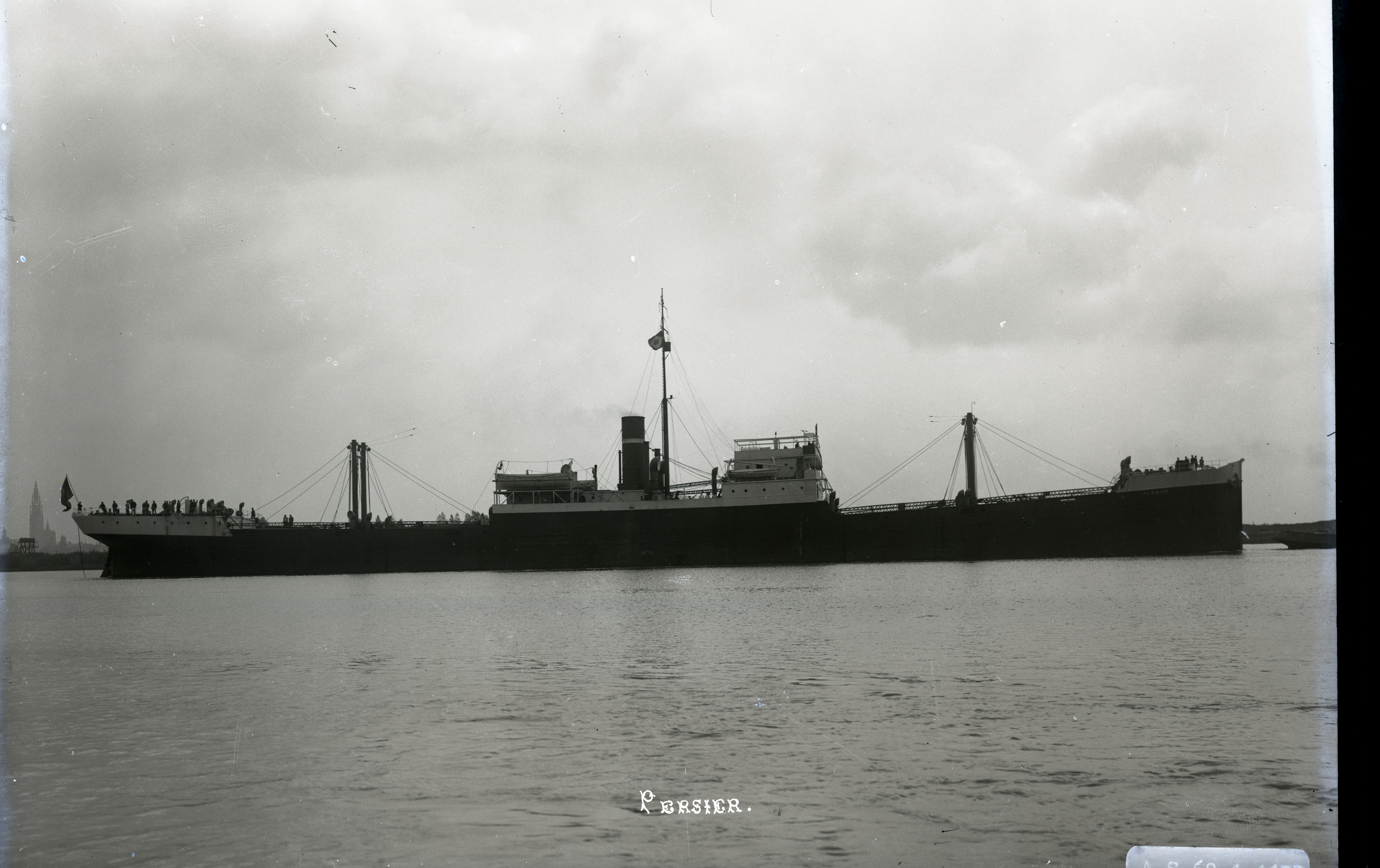
- Persier

History
- Name: War Buffalo (1918–19); Persier (1919–45)
- Owner: The Shipping Controller (1918–19); Lloyd Royal Belge SA (1919–30); Compagnie Maritime Belge SA (1930–45)
- Operator: Rankin, Gilmour & Co Ltd (1918–19); Lloyd Royal Belge SA (1919–30); Agence Maritime Internationale (1930–45)
- Port of registry: (United Kingdom of Great Britain and Ireland) London (1918–19); (Belgium) Antwerp (1919–45)
- Builder: Northumberland Shipbuilding Co Ltd
- Yard number: 248
- Launched: February 1918
- Completed: June 1918
- Out of service: 1941–43
- Identification: Code Letters MPDI (1919–34); Code Letters OOZA (1934–45)
- Fate: Torpedoed and sunk on 11 February 1945

General characteristics
- Type: Cargo ship
- Tonnage: 5,382 GRT; 3,293 NRT
- Length: 400 ft 2 in (121.97 m)
- Beam: 52 ft 3 in (15.93 m)
- Draught: 25 ft 3 in (7.70 m)
- Depth: 28 ft 5 in (8.66 m)
- Propulsion: Triple expansion steam engine
- Speed: 10.5 knots (19.4 km/h)
- Crew: 51

Persier was a 5,382 GRT cargo ship which was built in 1918 as War Buffalo for the British Shipping Controller. In 1919, she was sold to Belgium and renamed Persier. Between 1934 and 1941 she also held a passenger certificate. She was driven ashore on the Icelandic coast in a storm in February 1941 which put her out of action for two years. Returned to service in February 1943, she served until 11 February 1945, when she was torpedoed and sunk by U-1017 with the loss of 20 crew.

== Description ==
The ship was built as yard number 248 in 1918 by Northumberland Shipbuilding Ltd, Newcastle-on-Tyne, Northumberland. She was completed in June 1918.

The ship was 400 feet 2 inches (121.97 m) long, with a beam of 52 feet 3 inches (15.93 m). She had a depth of 28 feet 5 inches (8.66 m) and a draught of 25 feet 3 inches (7.70 m). She was assessed at 5,349 GRT, 3,271 NRT.

The ship was propelled by a triple expansion steam engine, which had cylinders of 27 inches (69 cm), 44 inches (110 cm) and 73 inches (190 cm) diameter by 48 inches (120 cm) stroke. The engine was built by North East Marine Engine Co (1938) Ltd, Newcastle upon Tyne. It produced 517nhp. It could propel the ship at 10.5 knots (19.4 km/h).

== History ==
War Buffalo was built for the British Shipping Controller. Her port of registry was London and she was operated under the management of Ranking, Gilmour & Co Ltd. In 1919, she was sold to Lloyd Royal Belge SA, Antwerp and renamed Persier, The Code Letters MPDI were allocated. She was the second Lloyd Royal Belge ship to bear that name. On 19 January 1922, Persier rescued five crew from the Newfoundland-registered schooner Eileen Lake, which foundered in the Atlantic Ocean west of Newfoundland. In 1930, Lloyd Royal Belge was merged with the Compagnie Maritime Belge du Congo to form Compagnie Maritime Belge SA. Persier was operated under the management of Agence Maritime Internationale. In 1934, her Code letters were changed to OOZA. Lloyd's Register shows that the ship held a passenger certificate from that date.

In May 1940, Persier took part in Operation Dynamo. On 28 October 1940, Persier departed Halifax, Nova Scotia as a member of Convoy HX 84. She was carrying a cargo of steel destined of Hull. In December 1940, she was anchored at Oban, Argyllshire when an air raid was carried out by Heinkel He 111 bombers based at Stavanger, Norway. Two bombs fell astern of Persia. A Dutch ship, the Breda was sunk. Although it was not realised at the time, Persier had been damaged in the raid, and some leaks were discovered during her next voyage, which was across the Atlantic. Her destination was Baltimore, Maryland. Once she was fully loaded, further damage was discovered and repairs had to be made, which left her straggling behind her convoy.

On 28 February 1941, Persier was battered by a storm, with a hatch cover being ripped off and the steering and electrical systems failing. She was stranded east off Vik in Myrdalur, Iceland and was severely damaged. Persier was refloated in April, and towed to Reykjavík by the tug Aegir for initial repairs to be made. On 9 June, Persier was taken to the Kleppsvik Strand, but broke her back as she was insufficiently supported, and was subsequently beached. On 8 February 1942, she was refloated and re-beached, finally being refloated on 20 May. She was towed by the tugs Empire Bascobel and Empire Larch to a Tyneside shipyard for repairs, which were completed in February 1943. Persier's first voyage on return to service was from Liverpool to New York, United States as a member of Convoy ON 169. Departing on 22 February, the convoy arrived on 21 March. In September 1943, Persier was a member of Convoy SC 141, which departed Halifax, Nova Scotia on 3 September, and arrived at Liverpool on 17 September. She was carrying a cargo of steel and woodpulp and was bound for London.

In 1944, Persier was selected to be one of the blockships when Operation Overlord, the invasion of France took place. Although she was prepared for scuttling, the decision was later reversed and she was refitted and returned to service. On 8 February 1945 Persier began her final voyage as part of Convoy BTC 65, setting off from Cardiff to take food to the liberated but starving people of Belgium. Carrying the convoy's Commodore, Persier was carrying a cargo consisting of 2,400 tons soup, 1,400 tons dried eggs, 1,000 tons meat and 20 tons of general cargo. On 11 February 1945 Persier was 4 nautical miles (7.4 km) off the Eddystone Lighthouse when she was hit by one of three torpedoes fired by U-1017. The ship developed a list to port and began to sink by the bows. One of the lifeboats was swamped and another was driven into the propeller, which was still turning. Twenty of the 51 crew, 8 naval personnel and four stowaways were killed. The British coasters Birker Force and Gem rescued seven and 20 people respectively. HMS Cornelian rescued 16 people. Although Persier was taken in tow, she later sank.

== Wreck ==
In 1969, the wreck of Persier was discovered by Plymouth Sound British Sub-Aqua Club (BSAC) at 50°17′00″N 3°58′15″W. She sits on her port side in 92 feet (28 m) of water, with the bow at a depth of 59 feet (18 m).

In 1975, a diabetic diver was injured on the wreck, resulting in a ban by BSAC of diving by diabetics. This ban has now been lifted. The wreck of Persier is host to a variety of marine life, including conger eels and lobsters.
