= Rosta (river) =

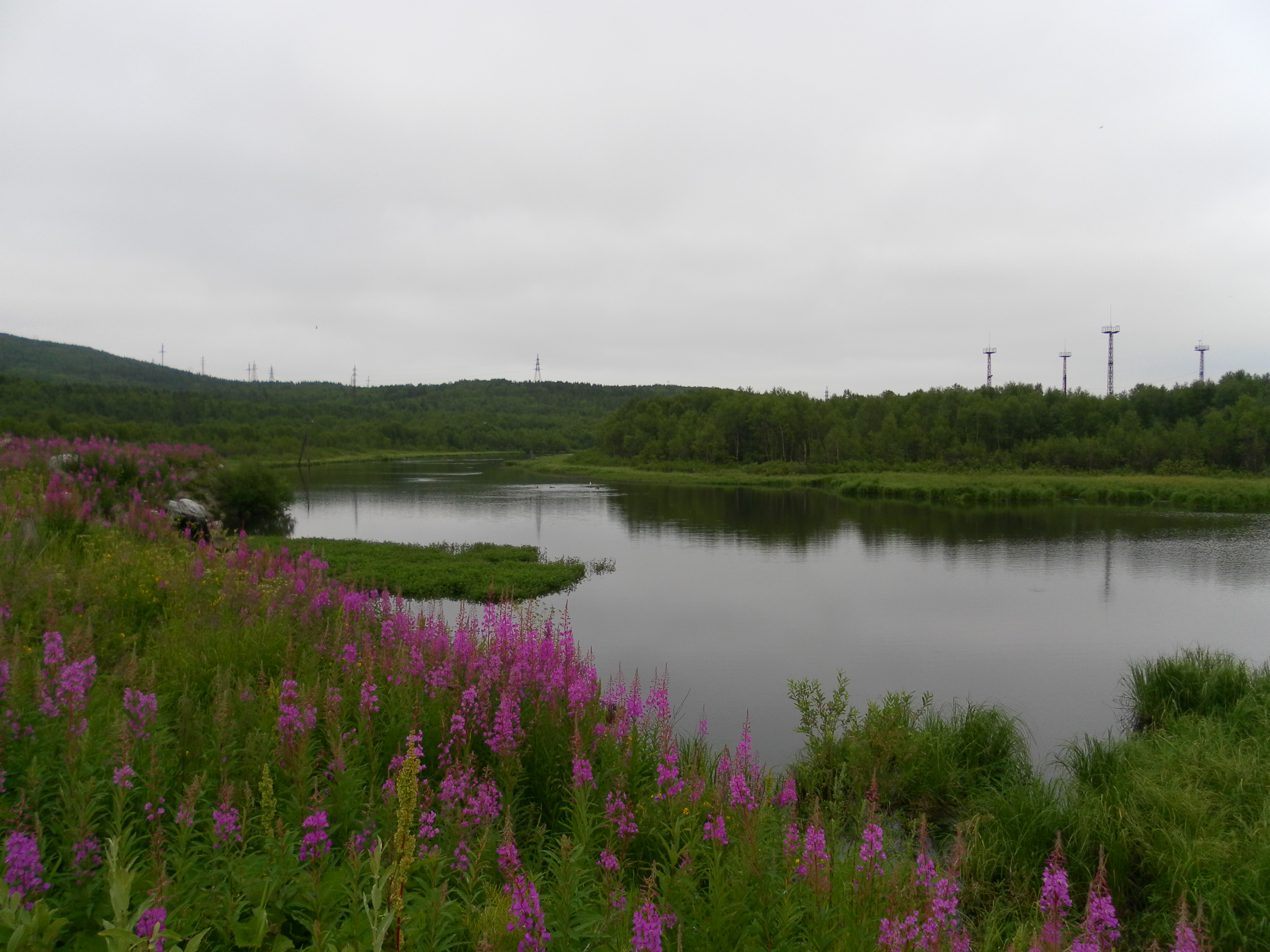
- Native name: Роста (Russian)

Location
- Country: Russia
- Region: Murmansk Oblast

Physical characteristics
- Mouth: Kola Bay (Barents Sea)
  - coordinates: 69.0336°N 33.0687°E
  - elevation: 0 m (0 ft)
- Length: 12 km (7.5 mi)

The Rosta (Russian: Роста) is a river in the north of the Kola Peninsula in Murmansk Oblast, Russia. It is 12 kilometres (7.5 mi) long. The Rosta originates in the Lake Rogozero and flows into the Kola Bay. The Rosta District of Murmansk takes its name from the river.
