= SS Arsterturm (1944) =

German cargo ship

History
- Name: Arsterturm
- Owner: Deutsche Dampfschiffahrts-Gesellschaft Hansa
- Operator: Deutsche Dampfschiffahrts-Gesellschaft Hansa
- Port of registry: (Nazi Germany) Bremen, Germany
- Builder: Deutsche Werft
- Yard number: 447
- Launched: 13 September 1944
- Completed: 31 October 1944
- Out of service: 26 February 1945
- Identification: Code Letters DOYO
- Fate: Bombed, torpedoed and sunk 26 February 1945

General characteristics
- Class & type: Hansa A type Cargo ship
- Tonnage: 1,923 GRT, 9,350 NRT, 3,200 DWT
- Length: 85.22 m (279 ft 7 in)
- Beam: 13.51 m (44 ft 4 in)
- Draught: 5.69 m (18 ft 8 in)
- Depth: 4.62 m (15 ft 2 in)
- Installed power: Compound steam engine, 1,200IHP
- Propulsion: Single screw propeller
- Speed: 10.5 knots (19.4 km/h)
- Crew: 25, plus 8-10 flak soldiers

Arsterturm was a Hansa A Type cargo ship which was built in 1944 Deutsche Dampfschiffahrts-Gesellschaft Hansa, Bremen. She was bombed and sunk on 26 February 1945.

== Description ==
The ship was 85.22 m (279 ft 7 in) long, with a beam of 13.51 m (44 ft 4 in). She had a depth of 4.62 m (15 ft 2 in), and a draught of 5.69 m (18 ft 8 in). She was assessed as 1,923 GRT, 930 NRT, 3,200 DWT.

The ship was propelled by a compound steam engine. The engine was built by Rheinmetall-Börsig AG, Görlitz Rated at 1,200IHP, it drove a single screw propeller and could propel the ship at 10.5 knots (19.4 km/h). The ship had a crew of 25, plus 8 to 10 flak soldiers. It was equipped with 1×30-tonne crane, 1×10-tonne crane and 10×5 tonne cranes.

== History ==
Arsterturm was a Hansa A Type cargo ship built in 1944 as yard number 447 by Deutsche Werft, Finkenwerder, Germany for Deutsche Dampfschiffahrts-Gesellschaft Hansa, Bremen. She was launched on 13 September 1944 and completed on 31 October. Her port of registry was Bremen and the Code Letters DOYO were allocated. She participated in the evacuation of the Ostgebiete in December 1944.

On 26 February 1945, Arsterturm was bombed, torpedoed and sunk by Allied aircraft south of Kristiansund, Norway with the loss of 31 of her crew. She was on a voyage from Swinemünde to Tromsø, Norway with a cargo of ammunition.
