= Japanese submarine I-370 =

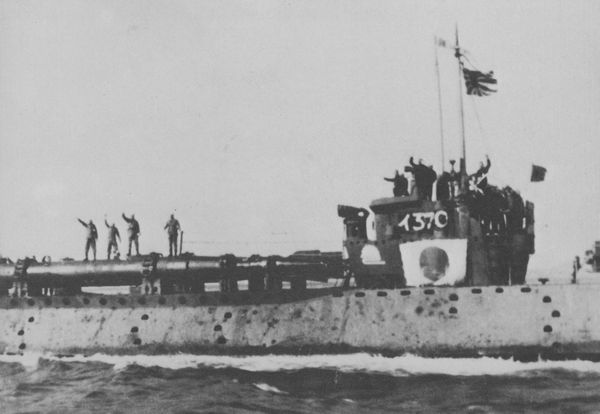
- I-370 at Otsujima Naval Base in Japan on 21 February 1945.

History

Japan
- Name: Submarine No. 5470
- Builder: Mitsubishi, Kobe, Japan
- Laid down: 4 December 1943
- Launched: 26 May 1944
- Renamed: I-370 on 26 May 1944
- Completed: 4 September 1944
- Commissioned: 4 September 1944
- Fate: Sunk by USS Finnegan, 26 February 1945
- Stricken: 10 April 1945

General characteristics
- Class & type: Type D1 submarine
- Displacement: 1,440 long tons (1,463 t) surfaced; 2,215 long tons (2,251 t) submerged
- Length: 73.50 m (241 ft 2 in) overall
- Beam: 8.90 m (29 ft 2 in)
- Draft: 4.76 m (15 ft 7 in)
- Propulsion: 2 × Kampon Mk.23B Model 8 diesels; 1,850 bhp surfaced; 1,200 shp submerged; 2 shafts
- Speed: 13.0 knots (24.1 km/h) surfaced; 6.5 knots (12.0 km/h) submerged
- Range: 15,000 nmi (28,000 km) at 10 knots (19 km/h) surfaced; 120 nmi (220 km) at 3 knots (5.6 km/h) submerged
- Test depth: 75 m (246 ft)
- Boats & landing craft carried: 2 x Daihatsu-class landing craft (removed January 1945)
- Capacity: 85 tons freight
- Complement: 55
- Sensors & processing systems: 1 × Type 22 surface search radar; 1 × Type 13 early warning radar
- Armament: 1 × 14 cm/40 11th Year Type naval gun (removed January 1945); 2 × Type 96 25mm AA guns; 5 x kaiten suicide attack torpedoes (added January 1945)

I-370 was an Imperial Japanese Navy Type D1 transport submarine. Completed and commissioned in September 1944, she served in World War II and was converted into a kaiten suicide attack torpedo carrier in January 1945. She was sunk in February 1945 while operating during the Battle of Iwo Jima.

== Construction and commissioning ==
I-370 was laid down on 4 December 1943 by Mitsubishi at Kobe, Japan, with the name Submarine No. 5470. She was launched on 26 May 1944 and renamed I-370 that day. She was completed and commissioned on 4 September 1944.

== Service history ==
Upon commissioning, I-370 was attached to the Sasebo Naval District and was assigned to Submarine Squadron 11 for workups. In January 1945, she was converted from a transport submarine into a kaiten suicide attack torpedo carrier, the conversion involving the removal of her 140-millimeter (5.5 in) and Daihatsu-class landing craft and their replacement with fittings allowing her to carry five kaitens on her deck, as well as the installation of Type 22 surface-search radar. On 10 January 1945, she and the submarine I-368 took part in simulated kaiten attacks against towed targets in the Seto Inland Sea that lasted 15 days.

The Battle of Iwo Jima began on 19 February 1945 when U.S. forces landed on Iwo Jima. The Japanese formed the Chihaya Kaiten Group, made up of I-370, I-368, and the submarine I-44, with orders to proceed to the waters off Iwo Jima and attack American ships there. On 21 February 1945, I-370 got underway from the kaiten base at Hikari and set course for Iwo Jima, where she was expected to begin kaiten attacks on 26 February 1945.

I-370 was on the surface just after dawn on 26 February 1945 preparing to launch all five of her kaitens to attack nine empty American transports steaming from Iwo Jima to Saipan when one of their escorts, the United States Navy destroyer escort USS Finnegan (DE-307), detected her on radar. Finnegan closed the range. Eight minutes after Finnegan detected I-370, I-370 crash-dived and broke radar contact with Finnegan, but at 0659 Finnegan acquired I-370 on sonar. Finnegan launched an unsuccessful Hedgehog attack, followed by a pattern of 13 depth charges set to explode deep. She launched another Hedgehog attack, then dropped a pattern of 13 depth charges set for medium depth at around 10:00. At around 10:05, Finnegan′s crew heard a deep rumbling sound, then observed air bubbles reaching the surface followed by an explosion.

It marked the end of I-370, sunk with the loss of all 84 men on board — her entire crew of 79 and all five embarked kaiten pilots — at 22°44′N 141°26′E. She was both the first submarine of the Chihaya Group and the first transport submarine converted into a kaiten carrier to be lost. A fuel oil slick at the scene of her sinking eventually covered an area of 4 by 2 nautical miles (7.4 by 3.7 km; 4.6 by 2.3 mi).

On 6 March 1945, the Japanese ordered I-370 to return to Japan, but she never acknowledged the order. On 14 March 1945, the Imperial Japanese Navy declared I-370 to be presumed lost with all hands off Iwo Jima. She was stricken from the Navy list on 10 April 1945.

== Sources ==
- Hackett, Bob & Kingsepp, Sander. IJN Submarine I-370: Tabular Record of Movement. Retrieved on September 16, 2020.
