= Convoy PQ 17 order of battle =

Convoy PQ 17
- Part of Arctic naval operations of the Second World War
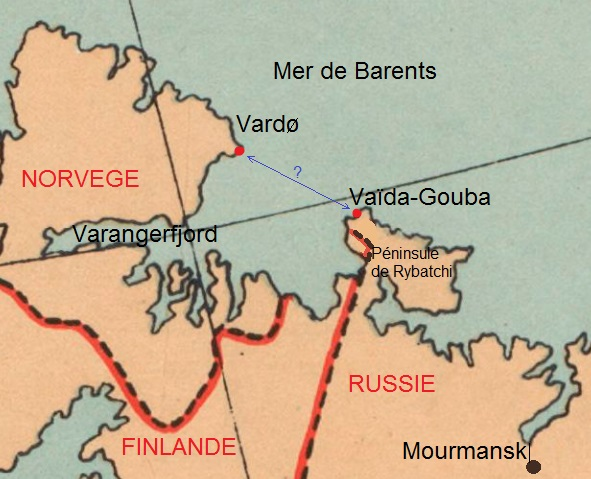
- Map of Varabgerfjord (in French)
Date	27 June – 10 July 1942
Location	Barents Sea
Result	German victory

Belligerents
United Kingdom; United States; Soviet Union; Netherlands; Panama	Germany: Luftwaffe; Kriegsmarine

Commanders and leaders
Dudley Pound; John Tovey; Louis Hamilton; Jack Broome; John Dowding	Erich Raeder; Hubert Schmundt; Hans-Jürgen Stumpff

Strength
35 merchant ships; Close escort: 6 destroyers; 11 escort vessels; 2 anti-aircraft ships; Covering forces: 1 aircraft carrier; 2 battleships; 6 cruisers; 13 destroyers	1 battleship; 3 cruisers; 12 destroyers; 11 U-boats; 33 torpedo-bombers; 6 bombers

Casualties and losses
153 merchant seamen killed; 24 merchant ships sunk; 3,350 vehicles; 210 aircraft; 430 tanks; 99,316 GRT general cargo	5 aircraft

Convoy PQ 17 was the penultimate convoy of the PQ series of Arctic convoys, bound from British and American ports through the Arctic Ocean via Reykjavík to the ports of the northern Soviet Union, particularly Murmansk and Arkhangelsk in the White Sea. The convoy was heavily defended, but fearing an imminent attack by German ships, including Tirpitz. The Admiralty made the decision to disperse the convoy.

The convoy comprised 35 merchant ships and 6 naval auxiliaries (41 in all) and was defended by a close escort and two distant escort forces, 43 warships in total. It was opposed by a U-boat gruppe Eisteufel, of first 6, then 8 U-boats, and a surface attack force of 16 warships, in two battle groups. This operation was code-named Unternehmen Rösselsprung (Operation Knight's Move). These were assisted by the 234 aircraft of Luftflotte 5.

Before the convoy dispersed, three ships had been lost. After it scattered each ship made its way individually to the Russian ports. Some ships took refuge along the frozen coast of Novaya Zemlya, landing at Matochkin. The Soviet tanker Azerbaijan had lost her cargo of linseed oil and much of SS Winston-Salem's cargo had also been jettisoned in Novaya Zemlya.

Of the thirty-six ships that left Iceland, three were forced to return early and 21 were sunk. Ten merchant ships (one British, six American, one Panamanian and two Russian) and four auxiliaries reached Archangel and delivered 70,000 long tons (71,000 t) out of the 200,000 long tons (200,000 t) which had started from Iceland.

== Allied forces ==
=== Operation ES ===
Force X
Name	Flag	Type	Dates	Notes
Feints towards Norway
HMS Adventure	Royal Navy	minelaying cruiser	Departed 29 June, 6 July	
HMS Curacoa	Royal Navy	C-class cruiser	Departed 29 June, 6 July	
HMS Sirius	Royal Navy	Dido-class cruiser	Departed 29 June, 6 July	
HMS Brighton	Royal Navy	Town-class destroyer	Departed 29 June, 6 July	
HMS St Mary's	Royal Navy	Town-class destroyer	Departed 29 June, 6 July	
HMS Nepal	Royal Navy	N-class destroyer	Departed 29 June, 6 July	
HNLMS Tjerk Hiddes	Royal Netherlands Navy	N-class destroyer	Departed 29 June, 6 July	
HMS Catterick	Royal Navy	Hunt-class destroyer	Departed 29 June, 6 July	
HMS Oakley	Royal Navy	Hunt-class destroyer	Departed 29 June, 6 July	
HMS Agamemnon	Royal Navy	Reefer ship conversion	Departed 29 June, 6 July	1st Minelaying Squadron
HMS Menestheus	Royal Navy	Reefer ship conversion	Departed 29 June, 6 July	1st Minelaying Squadron
HMS Port Quebec	Royal Navy	Reefer ship conversion	Departed 29 June, 6 July	1st Minelaying Squadron
HMS Southern Prince	Royal Navy	Reefer ship conversion	Departed 29 June, 6 July	1st Minelaying Squadron
5 colliers	Merchant Navy	—	Departed 29 June, 6 July	
4 HMT trawlers	Royal Navy	—	Departed 29 June, 6 July	

=== Convoy PQ 17 ===
Freighters convoyed
Name	Year	GRT	Flag	Notes
Alcoa Ranger	1919	5,116	United States	Sunk U-255, 7 July, 0† 40 surv
Aldersdale	1937	8,402	Royal Navy	Fleet oiler, damaged by aircraft 5 July, sunk U-457, 7 July, 0† 54 surv
Azerbaidjan	1932	6,114	Soviet Union	Damaged
Bellingham	1920	5,345	United States	
Benjamin Harrison	1942	7,191	United States	
Bolton Castle	1939	5,203	Merchant Navy	Sunk by aircraft, 5 July
Carlton	1920	5,127	United States	Sunk U-88, 5 July, 3† 42 surv
Christopher Newport	1942	7,191	United States	Damaged by aircraft, sunk U-457, 4 July, 3† 47 surv
Daniel Morgan	1942	7,177	United States	Damaged by aircraft, sunk U-88, 5 July, 3† 51 surv
Donbass	1935	7,925	Soviet Union	
Earlston	1941	7,195	Merchant Navy	Damaged by aircraft, sunk U-334, 5 July
El Capitan	1917	5,255	Panama	Damaged by aircraft 9 July, sunk U-251, 10 July, 0† 67
Empire Byron	1941	6,640	Merchant Navy	Damaged by aircraft 4 July, sunk U-703, 5 July, 7† 63 surv
Empire Tide	1941	6,978	Merchant Navy	CAM ship
Exford		4,969	United States	Ice damage, turned back
Fairfield City	1921	5,686	United States	Sunk by aircraft, 5 July
Gray Ranger	1941	3,313	Royal Navy	Fleet oiler, (Force Q) ice damage, detached 2 July, to Convoy QP 13
Hartlebury	1934	5,082	Merchant Navy	Sunk U-355, 7 July, 38† 20 surv
Honomu	1919	6,977	United States	Sunk U-456, 5 July, 13† 28 surv
Hoosier	1920	5,060	United States	Damaged by aircraft 9 July, sunk U-376, 10 July, 0† 53 surv
Ironclad	1919	5,685	United States	
John Witherspoon	1942	7,191	United States	Sunk U-255, 6 July, 1† 49 surv
Navarino	1937	4,841	Merchant Navy	Sunk by aircraft, 5 July
Ocean Freedom	1942	7,173	Merchant Navy	
Olopana	1920	6,069	United States	Sunk U-255, 8 July, 7† 34 surv
Pan Atlantic	1919	5,411	United States	Sunk by aircraft, 6 July
Pan Kraft	1919	5,644	United States	Sunk by aircraft, 7 July
Paulus Potter	1942	7,168	Netherlands	Damaged by aircraft 5 July, sunk U-255, 13 July, 0† 76 surv
Peter Kerr	1920	6,476	United States	Sunk by aircraft, 5 July
Richard Bland		7,191	United States	Ran aground, towed back to port
River Afton	1935	5,479	Merchant Navy	Convoy Commodore sunk U-703, 5 July, 26† 38 surv
Samuel Chase	1942	7,191	United States	
Silver Sword	1919	4,937	United States	
Troubador	1920	6,428	Panama	
Washington	1919	5,564	United States	Sunk by aircraft, 5 July
West Gotomska	1918	5,728	United States	Engine trouble, returned to port
William Hooper	1942	7,177	United States	Damaged by aircraft 4 July, sunk U-334, 4 July
Winston-Salem	1920	6,223	United States	Ran aground, recovered, Molotovsk (now Severodvinsk) 28 July

=== Escort ===
Name	Flag	Class	Notes
Close escort
HMS Escapade	Royal Navy	E-class destroyer	29 June – 4 July
HMS Fury	Royal Navy	F-class destroyer	30 June – 4 July
HMS Offa	Royal Navy	O-class destroyer	30 June – 4 July
HMS Keppel	Royal Navy	Shakespeare-class destroyer	Senior Officer Escort, 30 June – 4 July
HMS Leamington	Royal Navy	Town-class destroyer	30 June – 4 July
HMS Ledbury	Royal Navy	Hunt-class destroyer	30 June – 4 July
HMS Wilton	Royal Navy	Hunt-class destroyer	30 June – 4 July
HMS Dianella	Royal Navy	Flower-class corvette	30 June – 4 July
HMS Lotus	Royal Navy	Flower-class corvette	30 June – 4 July
HMS La Malouine	Royal Navy	Flower-class corvette	30 June – 4 July
HMS Poppy	Royal Navy	Flower-class corvette	30 June – 4 July
HMS Britomart	Royal Navy	Halcyon-class minesweeper	27 June − 4 July
HMS Halcyon	Royal Navy	Halcyon-class minesweeper	27 June – 4 July
HMS Salamander	Royal Navy	Halcyon-class minesweeper	27 June – 4 July
HMS Palomares	Royal Navy	Anti-aircraft ship	27 June – 4 July
HMS Pozarica	Royal Navy	Anti-aircraft ship	27 June – 4 July
HMT Ayrshire	Royal Navy	ASW trawler	27 June – 4 July
HMT Lord Austin	Royal Navy	ASW trawler	27 June – 4 July
HMS Lord Middleton	Royal Navy	ASW trawler	27 June – 4 July
HMT Northern Gem	Royal Navy	ASW trawler	27 June – 4 July
Rathlin	United Kingdom	Rescue ship	Arrived Archangel, 9 July
Zaafaran	United Kingdom	Rescue ship	Sunk by aircraft, 5 July
Zamalek	United Kingdom	Rescue ship	
HMS P614	Royal Navy	P611-class submarine	30 June – 4 July
HMS P615	Royal Navy	P611-class submarine	27 June – 4 July
Force Q (Fleet oiler and escort)
HMS Douglas	Royal Navy	Scott-class destroyer	27 June – 2 July Detached to Convoy QP 13
RFA Gray Ranger	Royal Fleet Auxiliary	Ranger-class tanker	27 June – 2 July Detached to Convoy QP 13
Covering force (1st Cruiser Squadron)
HMS London	Royal Navy	County-class cruiser	1–4 July
HMS Norfolk	Royal Navy	County-class cruiser	1–4 July
USS Tuscaloosa	{United States	New Orleans-class cruiser	1–4 July
USS Wichita	United States	Wichita-class cruiser	1–4 July
HMS Somali	Royal Navy	Tribal-class destroyer	1–4 July
USS Rowan	United States	Benham-class destroyer	1–4 July
USS Wainwright	United States	Sims-class destroyer	1–4 July
Distant Cover (Home Fleet)
HMS Victorious	Royal Navy	Illustrious-class aircraft carrier	29 June – 4 July
HMS Duke of York	Royal Navy	King George V-class battleship	29 June – 4 July
USS Washington	United States	North Carolina-class battleship	29 June – 4 July
HMS Cumberland	Royal Navy	County-class cruiser	29 June – 4 July
HMS Nigeria	Royal Navy	Fiji-class cruiser	29 June – 4 July
HMS Ashanti	Royal Navy	Tribal-class destroyer	1–4 July
USS Mayrant	United States	Benham-class destroyer	1–4 July
USS Rhind	United States	Benham-class destroyer	1–4 July
HMS Escapade	Royal Navy	E-class destroyer	29 June – 4 July
HMS Faulknor	Royal Navy	F-class destroyer	29 June – 4 July
HMS Marne	Royal Navy	M-class destroyer	29 June – 4 July
HMS Martin	Royal Navy	M-class destroyer	29 June – 4 July
HMS Onslaught	Royal Navy	O-class destroyer	29 June – 4 July
HMS Onslow	Royal Navy	O-class destroyer	1–4 July
HMS Blankney	Royal Navy	Hunt-class destroyer	29 June – 4 July
HMS Middleton	Royal Navy	Hunt-class destroyer	27 June – 4 July
HMS Wheatland	Royal Navy	Hunt-class destroyer	29 June – 4 July
Submarine patrols
Allied submarine flank screen
HMS Sahib	Royal Navy	S-class submarine	
HMS Sturgeon	Royal Navy	S-class submarine	
Minerve	Free French Naval Forces	Minerve-class submarine	
HMS Unrivalled	Royal Navy	U-class submarine	
HMS Unshaken	Royal Navy	U-class submarine	
Bear Island patrol line
HMS Seawolf	Royal Navy	U-class submarine	
HMS Trident	Royal Navy	T-class submarine	
HMS Tribune	Royal Navy	T-class submarine	
HMS Ursula	Royal Navy	U-class submarine	
Soviet submarines off Varangerfjord
D-3	Soviet Navy	Dekabrist-class submarine	Sunk off Varangerfjord, ? mined
K-2	Soviet Navy	Soviet K-class submarine	
K-21	Soviet Navy	Soviet K-class submarine	
K-22	Soviet Navy	Soviet K-class submarine	
M-176	Soviet Navy	Soviet M-class submarine	Sunk off Varangerfjord, ? mined
Shch-402	Soviet Navy	Shchuka-class submarine	
Shch-403	Soviet Navy	Shchuka-class submarine	

== Axis order of battle ==
=== Luftflotte 5 ===
Luftflotte 5, 1 June 1942
Command	Units
Luftflotte 5 HQ Colonel-General Hans-Jürgen Stumpff
Oslo	Wettererkundungsstaffel 5 (Weather reconnaissance squadron)
Fliegerführer Nord (Ost) Oberst (Colonel) Hermann Busch
Kirkenes	I. and II./Kampfgeschwader 30; II. and 13./Jagdgeschwader 5; I./Sturzkampfgeschwader 5 (Dive-Bomber Wing); 3./Kampfgeschwader 26; 1./Seeaufklärungsgruppe 125 (Maritime Reconnaissance Wing); 1./Fernaufklärungsgruppe 22; 1./Fernaufklärungsgruppe 124 (Long-Range Reconnaissance Wing)
Fliegerführer Nord (West) Oberst Alexander Holle
Sola	I./Kampfgeschwader 26; I./Kampfgeschwader 40; 2./Küstenfliegergruppe 906 (Coastal Reconnaissance Wing); Bordfliegerstaffel Tirpitz; 1./Fernaufklärungsgruppe 120
Fliegerführer Lofoten Oberst Ernst-August Roth
Bardufoss	III./Kampfgeschwader 30; III./Jagdgeschwader 5; 2./Kampfgeschwader 26; 4./Sturzkampfgeschwader 5; Kette 1./Fernaufklärungsgruppe 124
Jagdfliegerführer Norwegen (Note: Fighter Commander Norway)
Trondheim	I./Jagdgeschwader 5; Jagdgruppe Drontheim (Fighter Wing)
Seenotdienstführer Norwegen (Note: Maritime Rescue Service Leader Norway)
—	Seenotbereichskommando VIII (Maritime Rescue Area Command); Seenotbereichskommando IX

=== Kriegsmarine ===
Name	Flag	Class	Notes
Scouting U-boats
U-255	Kriegsmarine	Type VIIC submarine	John Witherspoon, Alcoa Ranger, Olopana, Paulus Potter
U-334	Kriegsmarine	Type VIIC submarine	William Hooper, Earlston (aircraft, then sunk by U-boat)
U-408	Kriegsmarine	Type VIIC submarine	
U-456	Kriegsmarine	Type VIIC submarine	Honomu (aircraft, then sunk by U-boat)
U-703	Kriegsmarine	Type VIIC submarine	Empire Byron (aircraft, then sunk by U-boat) River Afton
Gruppe Eisteufel
U-88	Kriegsmarine	Type VIIC submarine	Sank Carlton, Daniel Morgan ( aircraft, then sunk by U-boat)
U-251	Kriegsmarine	Type VIIC submarine	El Capitan (aircraft, then sunk by U-boat)
U-355	Kriegsmarine	Type VIIC submarine	Hartlebury
U-376	Kriegsmarine	Type VIIC submarine	Hoosier (aircraft, then sunk by U-boat)
U-457	Kriegsmarine	Type VIIC submarine	Christopher Newport, Aldersdale (aircraft, then sunk by U-boat)
U-657	Kriegsmarine	Type VIIC submarine	
Ships
Force I (Admiral Otto Schniewind)
Tirpitz	Kriegsmarine	Bismarck-class battleship	Trondheim to Gimsøya Strait to Altafjord
Admiral Hipper	Kriegsmarine	Admiral Hipper-class cruiser	Trondheim to Gimsøya Strait to Altafjord
Z20 Karl Galster	Kriegsmarine	Type 1936-class destroyer	Trondheim to Gimsøya Strait, scraped bottom, returned Trondheim
Z14 Friedrich Ihn	Kriegsmarine	Type 1934A-class destroyer	Trondheim to Gimsøya Strait to Altafjord
Z10 Hans Lody	Kriegsmarine	Type 1934A-class destroyer	Trondheim to Gimsøya Strait, scraped bottom, returned Trondheim
Z6 Theodor Riedel	Kriegsmarine	Type 1934A-class destroyer	Trondheim to Gimsøya Strait, scraped bottom, returned Trondheim
T7	Kriegsmarine	Type 35 torpedo boat	Trondheim to Gimsøya Strait to Altafjord
T15	Kriegsmarine	Type 35 torpedo boat	Trondheim to Gimsøya Strait to Altafjord
Force II (Vice-Admiral Oskar Kummetz)
Admiral Scheer	Kriegsmarine	Deutschland-class cruiser	Narvik to Altafjord
Lützow	Kriegsmarine	Deutschland-class cruiser	Narvik to Altafjord, grounded, returned Bogen Bay
Z24	Kriegsmarine	Type 1936A-class destroyer	Narvik to Altafjord
Z27	Kriegsmarine	Type 1936A-class destroyer	Narvik to Altafjord
Z28	Kriegsmarine	Type 1936A-class destroyer	Narvik to Altafjord
Z29	Kriegsmarine	Type 1936A-class destroyer	Narvik to Altafjord
Z30	Kriegsmarine	Type 1936A-class destroyer	Narvik to Altafjord
Z4 Richard Beitzen	Kriegsmarine	Type 1934-class destroyer	Narvik to Altafjord

== See also ==
- Arctic convoys of World War II
- Operation Rösselsprung
- Operation Wunderland
