= Arctic convoys of World War II =

Allied oceangoing convoys

- Part of World War II
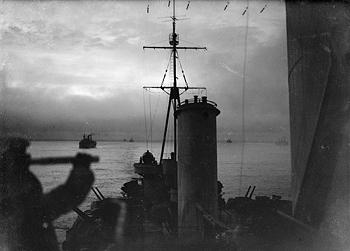
- View from the cruiser HMS Sheffield escorting a convoy in the Arctic Ocean. In the background are merchant ships of the convoy.
Date	August 1941 – May 1945
Location	Norwegian Sea and Arctic Ocean
Result	Allied victory

Belligerents
United Kingdom; Soviet Union; Canada; United States; Australia; Norway; Panama; Free France	Germany; Italy (until 1943); Japan

Casualties and losses
85 merchant vessels; 16 warships	4 warships; 30 submarines

The Arctic convoys of World War II were 78 convoys that sailed from the United Kingdom, Iceland and North America, most to Arkhangelsk (Archangel) and Murmansk in the northern Soviet Union. The first convoy series was Convoy PQ 1 to Convoy PQ 18 (outbound) and Convoy QP 1 to Convoy QP 15 (inbound). The second series was Convoy JW 51 to Convoy JW 67 (outbound) and Convoy RA 51 to Convoy RA 67 (inbound). The convoys began in August 1941 and ended in May 1945, with suspensions during several months in 1942 and in the summers of 1943 and 1944.

About 1,400 merchant ships sailed in the convoys, under the Anglo-Soviet Agreement and US Lend-Lease, mainly escorted by ships of the Royal Navy, with support from the Royal Canadian Navy and the US Navy. The convoys lost 85 merchant vessels and 16 British warships, including two cruisers. The Kriegsmarine lost the battleship Scharnhorst, three destroyers, and 30 U-boats; the Luftwaffe lost many aircraft. The convoys demonstrated the Western Allied commitment to the Soviet Union before the Operation Overlord, the invasion of France and tied up substantial German naval and air forces.

== Background ==
=== Arctic convoys ===
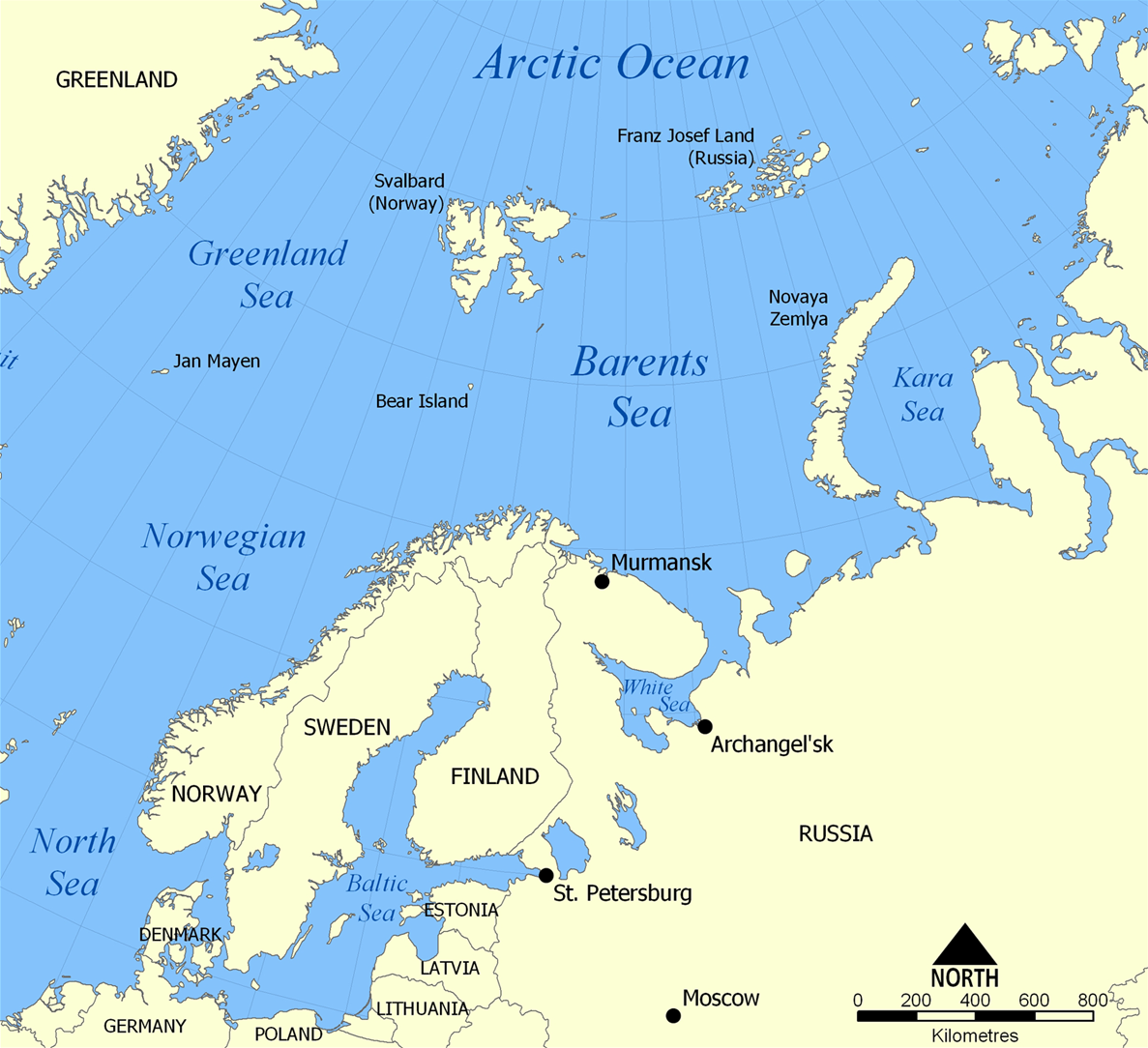
Map of the Norwegian Sea and the Barents Sea

The Soviet authorities had claimed that the unloading capacity of Arkhangelsk was 300,000 long tons (300,000 t), Vladivostok 140,000 long tons (140,000 t) and 60,000 long tons (61,000 t) by the Persian Gulf route. When surveyed by British and US technicians, the capacity of the ten berths at Arkhangelsk was assessed as 90,000 long tons (91,000 t) and the same from Murmansk from its eight berths. By late 1941, the convoy system used in the Atlantic had been established on the Arctic run; a convoy commodore ensured that the ships' masters and signals officers attended a briefing before sailing to make arrangements for the management of the convoy, which sailed in a formation of long rows of short columns. The commodore was usually a retired naval officer, aboard a ship identified by a white pendant with a blue cross. The commodore was assisted by a naval signals party of four men, who used lamps, semaphore flags and telescopes to pass signals, coded from books carried in a bag, weighted to be dumped overboard. In large convoys, the commodore was assisted by vice- and rear-commodores to direct the speed, course, and zig-zagging of the merchant ships and liaise with the escort commander. (Note: By the end of 1941, 187 Matilda II and 249 Valentine tanks had been delivered, comprising 25 per cent of the medium-heavy tanks in the Red Army, making 30–40 per cent of the medium-heavy tanks defending Moscow. In December 1941, 16 per cent of the fighters defending Moscow were Hawker Hurricanes and Curtiss Tomahawks from Britain and by 1 January 1942, 96 Hurricane fighters were flying in the Soviet Air Forces (Voyenno-Vozdushnye Sily, VVS). The British supplied radar apparatus, machine tools, Asdic and commodities.)

After Convoy PQ 16 and the disaster to Convoy PQ 17 in July 1942, Arctic convoys were postponed for nine weeks and much of the Home Fleet was detached to the Mediterranean for Operation Pedestal, a Malta convoy. During the lull, Admiral John Tovey concluded that the Home Fleet had been of no great protection to convoys beyond Bear Island, midway between Spitsbergen and the North Cape. Tovey would oversee the operation from Scapa Flow, where the fleet was linked to the Admiralty by landline, immune to variations in wireless reception. The next convoy should be accompanied by sufficient protection against surface attack; the longer-range destroyers of the Home Fleet could be used to augment the close escort force of anti-submarine and anti-aircraft ships, to confront a sortie by German ships with the threat of a massed destroyer torpedo attack. The practice of meeting homeward-bound QP convoys near Bear Island was dispensed with and Convoy QP 14 was to wait until Convoy PQ 18 was near its destination, despite the longer journey being more demanding of crews, fuel and equipment. The new escort carrier HMS Avenger (Commander Anthony Colthurst) had arrived from the United States and was added to the escort force.

=== First Protocol ===
The Soviet leaders needed to replace the colossal losses of military equipment caused by Operation Barbarossa the German invasion, especially when Soviet war industries were being moved out of the war zone. The Soviets emphasised tank and aircraft deliveries; machine tools, steel and aluminium were also needed to replace indigenous resources lost in the invasion. The pressure on the civilian sector of the economy needed to be limited by food deliveries. The Soviets wanted to concentrate the resources that remained on items that the Soviet war economy that had the greatest comparative advantage over the German economy. Aluminium imports allowed aircraft production to a far greater extent than would have been possible using local sources and tank production was emphasised at the expense of lorries and food supplies were squeezed by reliance on what could be obtained from lend–lease. At the Moscow Conference, it was acknowledged that 1.5 million tons of shipping was needed to transport the supplies of the First Protocol and that Soviet sources could provide less than 10 per cent of the carrying capacity.

The British and Americans accepted that the onus was on them to find most of the shipping, despite their commitments in other theatres. The Prime Minister, Winston Churchill, made a commitment to send a convoy to the Arctic ports of the USSR every ten days and to deliver 1,200 tanks a month from July 1942 to January 1943, followed by 2,000 tanks and another 3,600 aircraft more than already promised. In November, the US president, Franklin D. Roosevelt, ordered Admiral Emory Land of the US Maritime Commission and then the head of the War Shipping Administration that deliveries to Russia should only be limited by 'insurmountable difficulties'. The first convoy was due at Murmansk around 12 October and the next convoy was to depart Iceland on 22 October. A motley of British, Allied and neutral shipping loaded with military stores and raw materials for the Soviet war effort would be assembled at Hvalfjörður in Iceland, convenient for ships from both sides of the Atlantic.

From Operation Dervish to Convoy PQ 11, the supplies to the USSR were mostly British, in British ships defended by the Royal Navy. A fighter force that could defend Murmansk was delivered that protected the Arctic ports and railways into the hinterland. British supplied aircraft and tanks reinforced the Russian defences of Leningrad and Moscow from December 1941. The tanks and aircraft did not save Moscow but were important in the Soviet counter-offensive. The Luftwaffe was by then reduced to 600 operational aircraft on the Eastern Front, to an extent a consequence of Luftflotte 2 being sent to the Mediterranean against the British. Tanks and aircraft supplied by the British helped the Soviet counter-offensive force back the Germans further than might have been possible. In January and February 1941, deliveries of tanks and aircraft allowed the Russians to have a margin of safety should the Germans attempt to counter-attack.

Post-war criticism of the quality of British supplies contradicted the praise offered to the Foreign Secretary, Anthony Eden, in Moscow in December, of the performance of Hurricane fighters and Valentine tanks; Matilda tanks were admittedly inferior in snow but were expected to operate better in the summer. Deliveries helped to improve the long-term potential of the Soviet war economy. The 17,000 long tons (17,000 t) of aluminium sent from Britain was the equivalent to the capacity lost in the Soviet Union in the six months from October 1941 and 10,000 long tons (10,000 t) each of copper and rubber were generally useful to the Soviet economy, especially after rubber from Malaya was cut off in the Malayan campaign (8 December 1941 – 15 February 1942). Radar and Asdic apparatuses improved Russian anti-aircraft defences and the naval protection of the Arctic ports. In the first winter of the war in Russia the British helped to tide the USSR over, at some cost to British grand strategy; the 700 fighters and about 500 tanks sent to Russia in 1941 could have made a substantial difference to British fortunes in the Middle East and Far East. The Germans laid plans to stop the Arctic convoys in 1942.

=== Signals intelligence ===
==== Bletchley Park ====
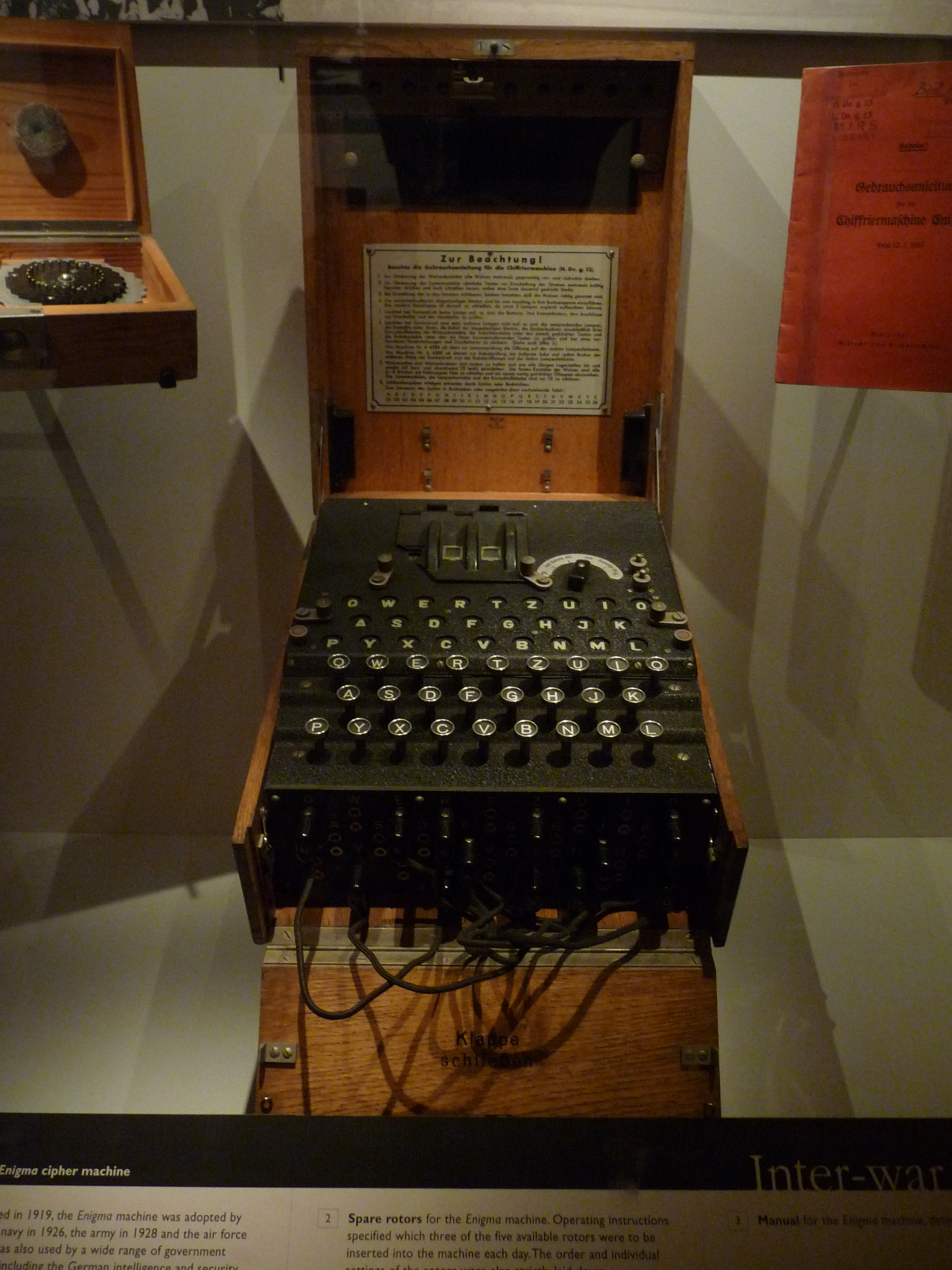
Photograph of a German Enigma coding machine

The British Government Code and Cypher School (GC&CS) based at Bletchley Park housed a small industry of code-breakers and traffic analysts. By June 1941, the German Enigma machine Home Waters (Heimish) settings used by surface ships and U-boats could quickly be read. On 1 February 1942, the Enigma machines used in U-boats in the Atlantic and Mediterranean were changed but German ships and the U-boats in Arctic waters continued with the older Heimish (Hydra from 1942, Dolphin to the British). By mid-1941, British Y-stations were able to receive and read Luftwaffe W/T transmissions and give advance warning of Luftwaffe operations.

In 1941, naval Headache personnel, with receivers to eavesdrop on Luftwaffe wireless transmissions, were embarked on warships and from May 1942, ships gained RAF Y computor parties, which sailed with cruiser admirals in command of convoy escorts, to interpret Luftwaffe W/T signals intercepted by the Headaches. The Admiralty sent details of Luftwaffe wireless frequencies, call signs and the daily local codes to the computors, which combined with their knowledge of Luftwaffe procedures, could glean fairly accurate details of German reconnaissance sorties. Sometimes computors predicted attacks twenty minutes before they were detected by radar.

==== B-Dienst ====
The rival German Beobachtungsdienst (B-Dienst, Observation Service) of the Kriegsmarine Marinenachrichtendienst (MND, Naval Intelligence Service) had broken several Admiralty codes and cyphers by 1939, which were used to help Kriegsmarine ships elude British forces and provide opportunities for surprise attacks. From June to August 1940, six British submarines were sunk in the Skaggerak using information gleaned from British wireless signals. In 1941, B-Dienst read signals from the Commander in Chief Western Approaches informing convoys of areas patrolled by U-boats, enabling the submarines to move into "safe" zones. B-Dienst had broken Naval Cypher No 3 in February 1942 and by March was reading up to 80 per cent of the traffic, which continued until 15 December 1943. By coincidence, the British lost access to German U-boat signals in the Atlantic when the Shark cypher was introduced and had no information to send in Cypher No 3 that might compromise Ultra.

== Convoy organisation ==
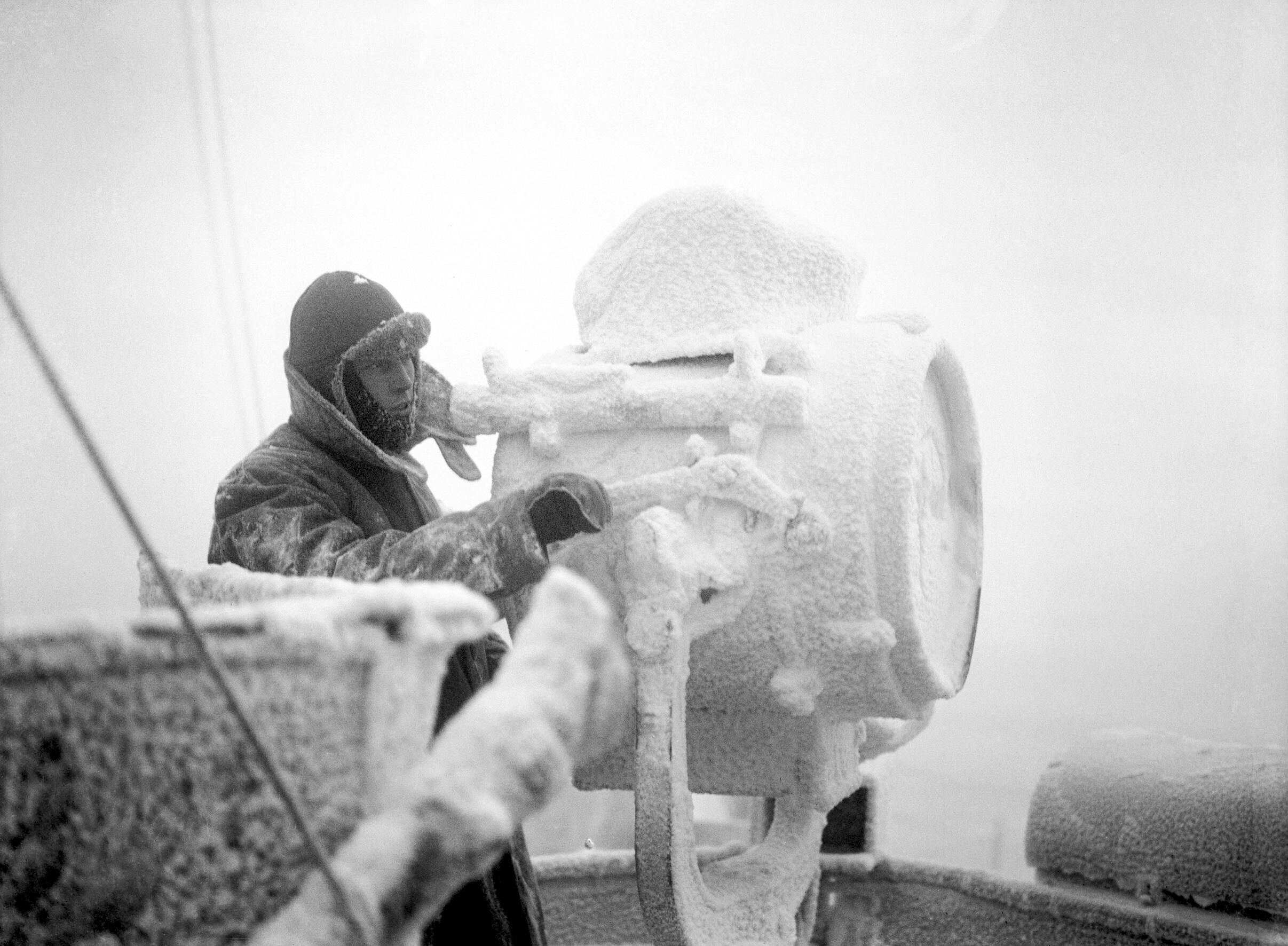
Ice forms on a 20-inch (51 cm) signal projector on the cruiser HMS Sheffield, part of the escort of an Arctic convoy to the Soviet Union.

After the first convoy, Operation Dervish, in August 1941, Arctic convoys were labelled PQ (outbound) and QP (return) and ran twice monthly from September 1941 to September 1942. In the summer of 1942, sailings were suspended after the disaster of Convoy PQ 17 and again in the autumn after the final convoy of the series, Convoy PQ 18, because of the long daylight hours and the preparations for Operation Torch in November 1942. When the convoys resumed they were called JW (outbound) and RA (return) and ran from December 1942 until the end of the war, with interruptions in the summer of 1943 and in the summer of 1944. Convoys began at Iceland (usually from Hvalfjörður) and sailed past Jan Mayen Island and Bear Island to Arkhangelsk when the ice permitted in the summer months, shifting south as the pack ice increased and terminating at Murmansk, an ice free port. From February 1942 Arctic convoys assembled and sailed from Loch Ewe in Scotland.

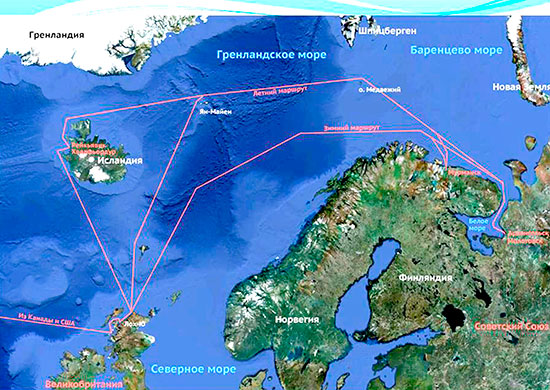
Routes of the northern allied convoys. 1941–1945

Outbound and the reciprocal return convoys ran simultaneously with a close escort to the USSR, then making the return journey with the unloaded ships of the reciprocal QP or RA convoy. A cruiser covering force sailed near the outbound convoy as far as Bear Island then transferred as the outbound and returning convoys crossed. A heavy covering force of aircraft carriers, battleships with cruiser and destroyer escorts guarded against sorties by big German ships like Tirpitz.

The route skirted occupied Norway to the Soviet ports, limited by Polar ice from extensive diversions to the north and risked interception by Luftwaffe reconnaissance aircraft, bombers and torpedo-bombers, U-boats and ships. Storms, gales, fog, snow and hail were common, hiding the ships but also dispersing convoys, increasing the risk of interception. Currents and layers of cold and warm water reduced the effectiveness of Asdic and ice could cause severe damage to ships and put them at risk of capsizing. The difficulty of ships in convoy of keeping station and of navigating in storms and constant darkness in winter was replaced by the danger of constant air and sea attacks in the permanent daylight of the Midnight sun (22 May to 22 July at Murmansk).

=== Convoy formation ===
Convoys in the Second World War had a standard formation of short columns, number 1 to the left in the direction of travel. Each position in the column was numbered; 11 was the first ship in column 1 and 12 was the second ship in the column; 21 was the first ship in column 2.

Convoy QP 1 sailing order
column 1	column 2	column 3	column 4
11 Lancastrian Prince	21 Alchiba	31 Llanstephan Castle	41 Trehata
12 Esneh	22 RFA Black Ranger	32 Alma-Ata	42 New Westminster City
13 Rodina	23 Stary Bolshevik	33 Sevzaples	43 Budyonny
14 —	24 Mossovet	34 —	44 —
15 —	25 Sukhona	35 —	45 —

== Other routes ==
=== Persian Corridor ===
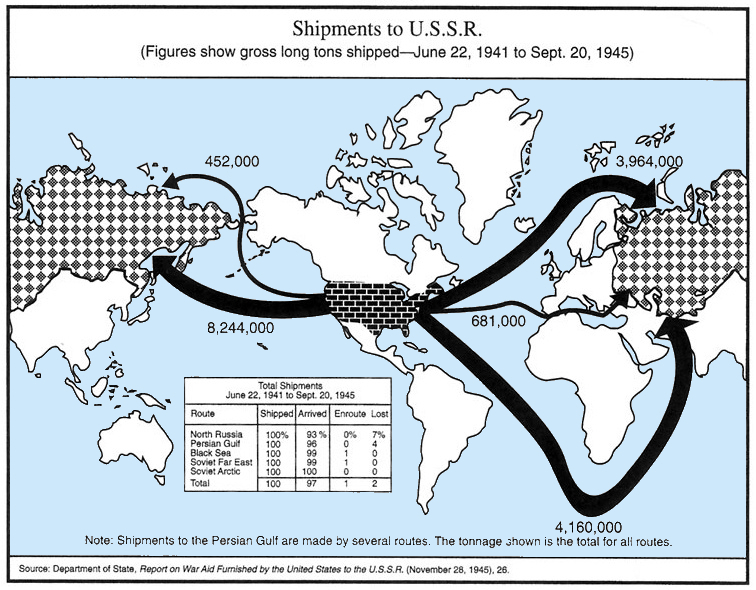
Map of US Lend-Lease shipments to the USSR

The Arctic route was the shortest, most direct and quickest route for supply convoys to the USSR, though it was also the most dangerous. About 3,964,000 long tons (4,028,000 t) of goods were sent via the Arctic, of which 93 per cent arrived. The route constituted about 23 per cent of the total aid to the USSR during the war. The Persian Corridor was the longest and only all-weather route to the USSR but did not become operational until mid-1942. Thereafter it saw the passage of 4,160,000 long tons (4,230,000 t) of goods, 27 per cent of the total.

=== Pacific Route ===
The Pacific Route opened in late summer 1941 but the Attack on Pearl Harbor (7 December 1941) meant that only Soviet-flagged ships could be used on the route. As Japan and the USSR observed a strict neutrality towards each other, only non-military goods could be carried. A total of 8,244,000 tons of goods went via the Pacific, 50 per cent of the total. A branch of the Pacific Route began carrying goods through the Bering Strait to the Soviet Arctic coast in June 1942. From July to September, small Soviet convoys assembled in Providence Bay, Siberia to be escorted north through the Bering Strait and west along the Northern Sea Route by icebreakers and Lend-Lease Admirable-class minesweepers. A total of 452,393 tons passed through the Bering Strait aboard 120 ships. Part of this northern tonnage was fuel for the airfields along the Alaska–Siberia Air Route. Provisions for the airfields were transferred to river vessels and barges in the estuaries of large Siberian rivers. Remaining ships continued westwards and were the only seaborne cargoes to reach Arkhangelsk while the Arctic convoys were suspended during the summers of 1943 and 1944.

== Aftermath ==
=== Analysis ===
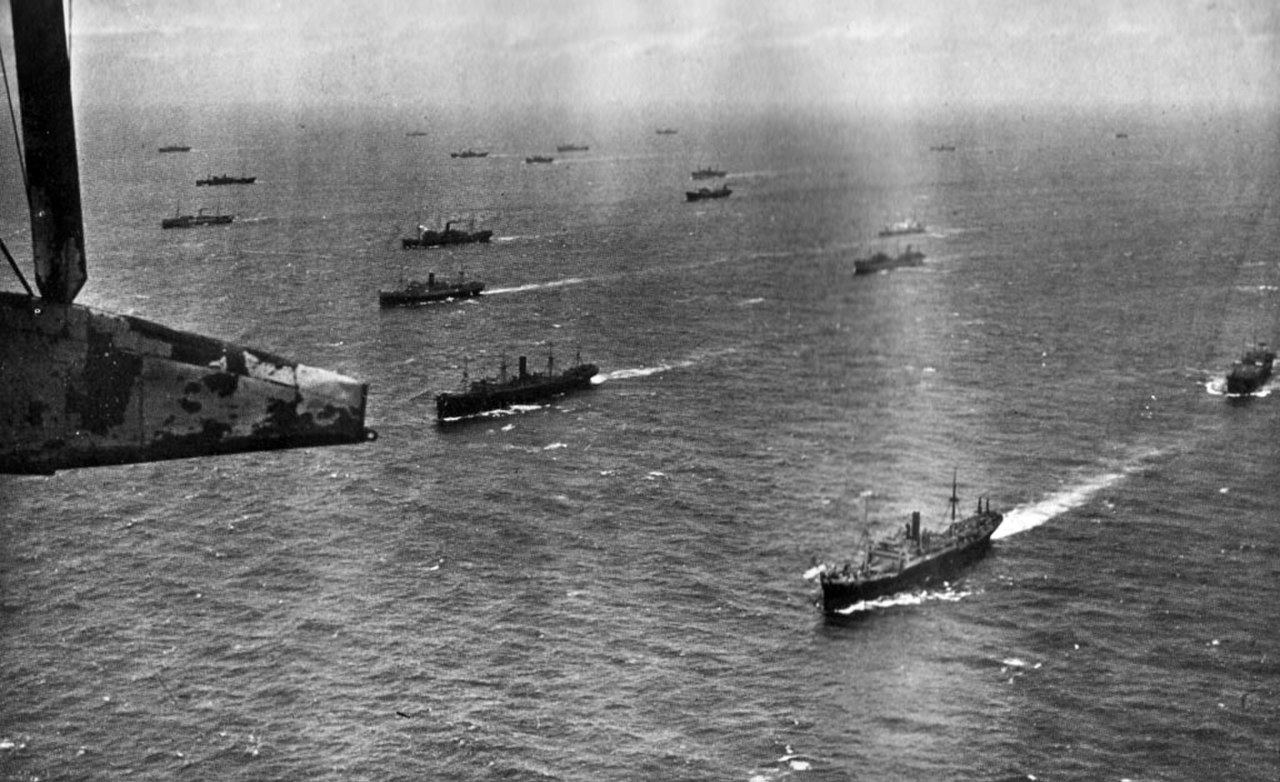
Arctic convoy at sea

Cargo included tanks, fighter aircraft, fuel, ammunition, raw materials and food. The early convoys in particular delivered armoured vehicles and Hurricanes to make up for shortages in the Soviet Union. The Arctic convoys caused changes to naval dispositions on both sides, which arguably had a big impact on events in other theatres of war. As a result of early raids by destroyers on German coastal shipping and Operation Archery the Commando raid on Vågsøy, Hitler thought that the British intended to invade Norway again. This, together with the obvious need to stop convoy supplies reaching the Soviet Union, caused him to direct that heavier ships, especially the battleship Tirpitz, be sent to Norway. The Channel Dash in early 1942 was partly undertaken for this reason.

Tirpitz and the other German capital ships tied down British resources which might have been better used elsewhere. The success of Gneisenau and Scharnhorst in Operation Berlin during early 1941 had demonstrated the potential of the German threat. As the Allies closed the Mid-Atlantic gap over the North Atlantic with very long range aircraft, Huff-Duff (high-frequency direction finding) improved airborne centimetric radar was introduced and convoys received escort carrier protection, the scope for commerce raiding diminished. To defend Norway German ships and U-boats were withdrawn from Atlantic bases and became responsible for offensive operations against the Arctic convoys

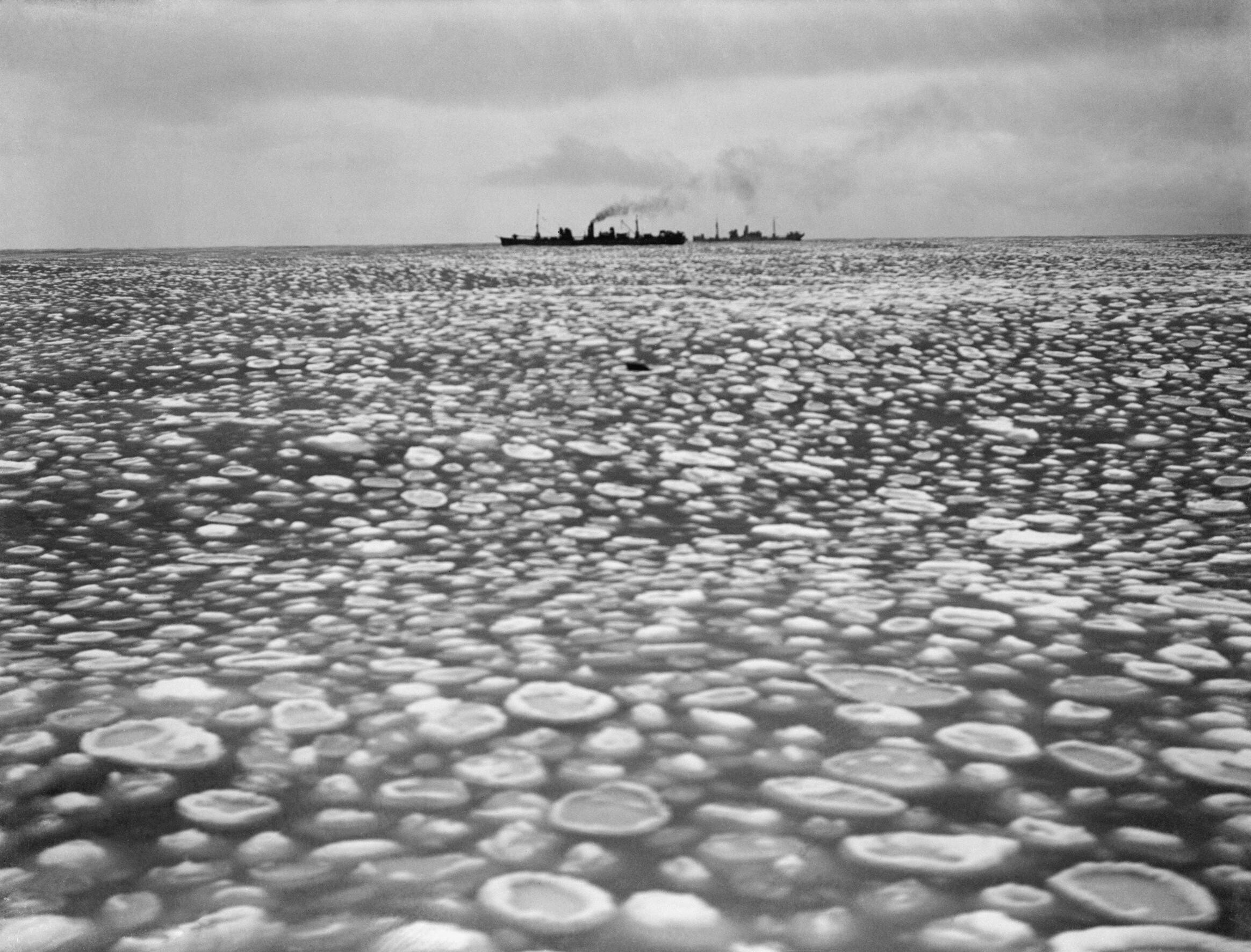
An Arctic convoy passing through pack ice; there is a seal on the ice in the middle distance; taken from the cruiser Scylla

Aside from an abortive attempt to attack Convoy PQ 12 in March 1942 and a raid on Spitzbergen in September 1943, Tirpitz spent most of the war in Norwegian fjords. Tirpitz was attacked and damaged several times and sunk in Tromsø fjord on 12 November 1944 by the Royal Air Force (RAF). Other Kriegsmarine capital ships, including Gneisenau never reached Norway, were chased off or were sunk like Scharnhorst. The failed attack on Convoy JW 51B, the Battle of the Barents Sea, where a strong German naval force failed to defeat a British escort of cruisers and destroyers, infuriated Hitler and led to the strategic change from surface raiders to submarines. Some capital ships were dismantled and armament used in coastal defences. The Siege of Leningrad was one of important destinations for supplies from the convoys. From 1941, food and munitions were delivered from British convoys to Leningrad by trains, barges and trucks. Many supplies were destroyed by the Luftwaffe and by Naval Detachment K en route. Convoys continued to deliver food in 1942, 1943 and 1944.

=== British intelligence ===
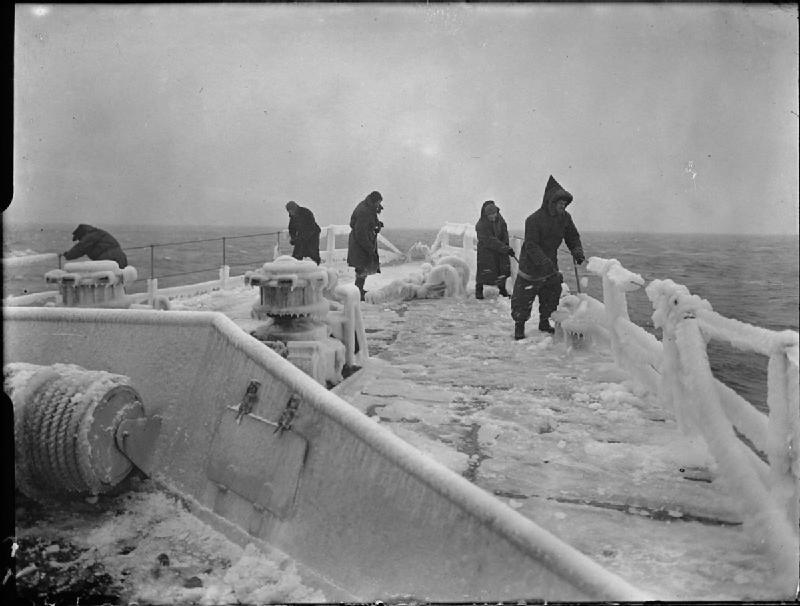
Crewmen clearing the frozen fo'c'sle of HMS Inglefield.

Ultra signals intelligence gained from the Enigma code-breakers at Bletchley Park played an important part in the success of the convoys. German documents related to the Enigma coding machine were captured during the commando raids of Operation Archery and Operation Anklet (27 December 1941). The documents enabled the British to read messages on the home waters naval Enigma used by surface ships and U-boats in the Arctic (Heimisch, later Hydra network; Dolphin to the British) for the rest of the war. In January 1942 reinforcements of Luftwaffe bombers, torpedo-bombers and long range reconnaissance aircraft were sent to northern Norway and new command organisations established at Stavanger and Kirkenes, followed by Fliegerführer Lofoten who was charged with the defence of Norway and offensive operations against Allied convoys.

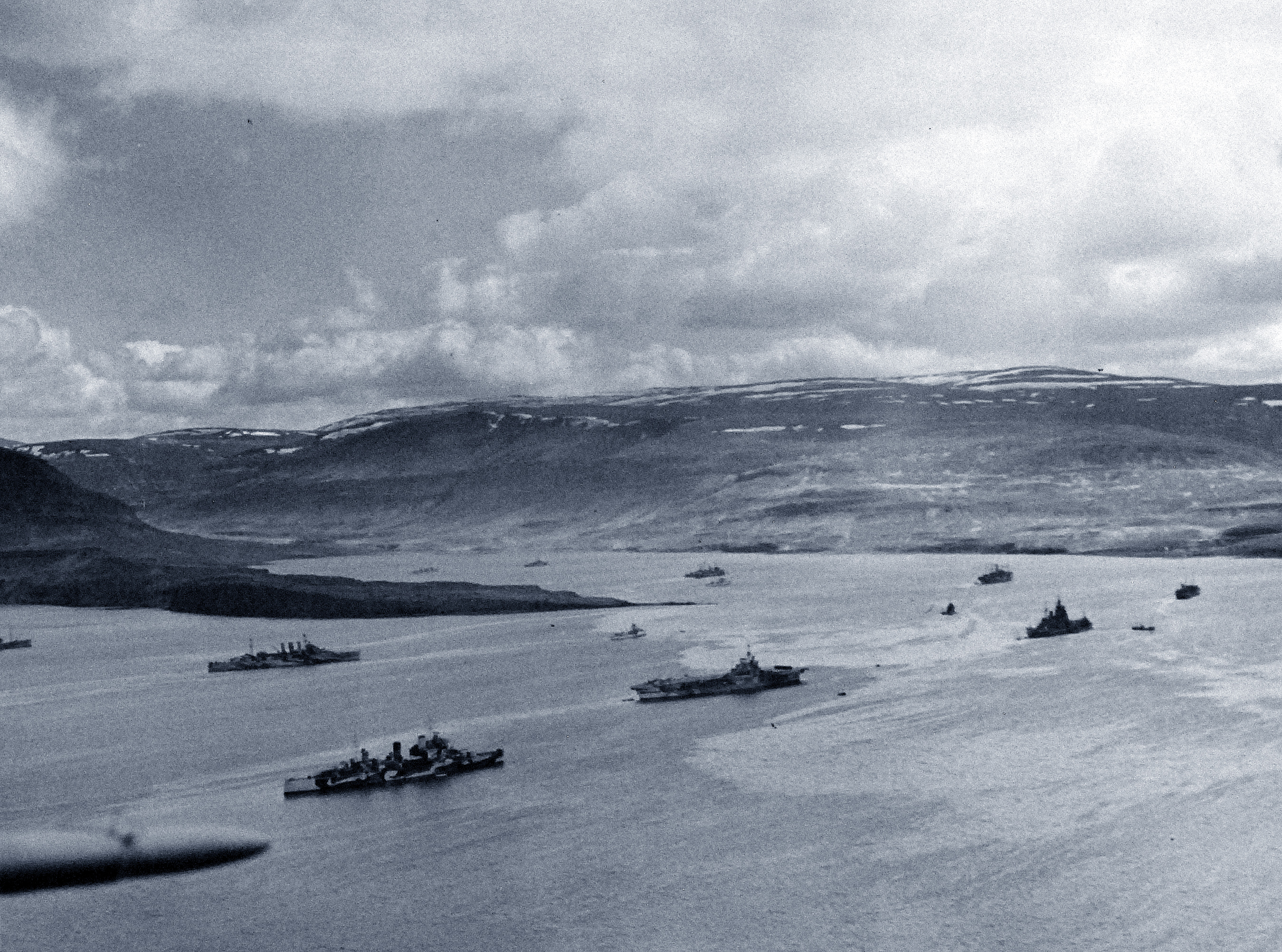
Escorts and merchant ships at Hvalfjord, Iceland before the sailing of Convoy PQ 17, June 1942

The three U-boats in the area were increased to nine and another six were distributed between Bergen, Trondheim and Narvik to reconnoitre and oppose Allied landings. In May, all the U-boats came under Arctic Command and on 23 May, Admiral Scheer and Prinz Eugen joined Tirpitz at Trondheim, followed by Admiral Hipper; by 26 May Lützow had arrived at Narvik. The British read these moves from Ultra intercepts and traffic analysis from the RAF Y-station at RAF Cheadle, which eavesdropped on communications between Luftwaffe aircraft and ground stations. The reinforcement of the U-boat force in the Arctic to 12 in March and 21 in August (the real number was later found to be 23) was followed, along with the transfer orders to the large German ships.

Ultra led to the ambush of Prinz Eugen by the submarine HMS Trident off Trondheim on 23 February. Prinz Eugen was badly damaged by a torpedo and the Admiralty was informed of the hit by an Enigma intercept the next day. The information could not always be acted upon because much of it was obtained at short notice but the intelligence did give the Royal Navy time to prepare for next time. The interception and sinking of Scharnhorst by HMS Duke of York was greatly assisted by Enigma intercepts.

== Noted convoys ==
=== Operation Dervish ===
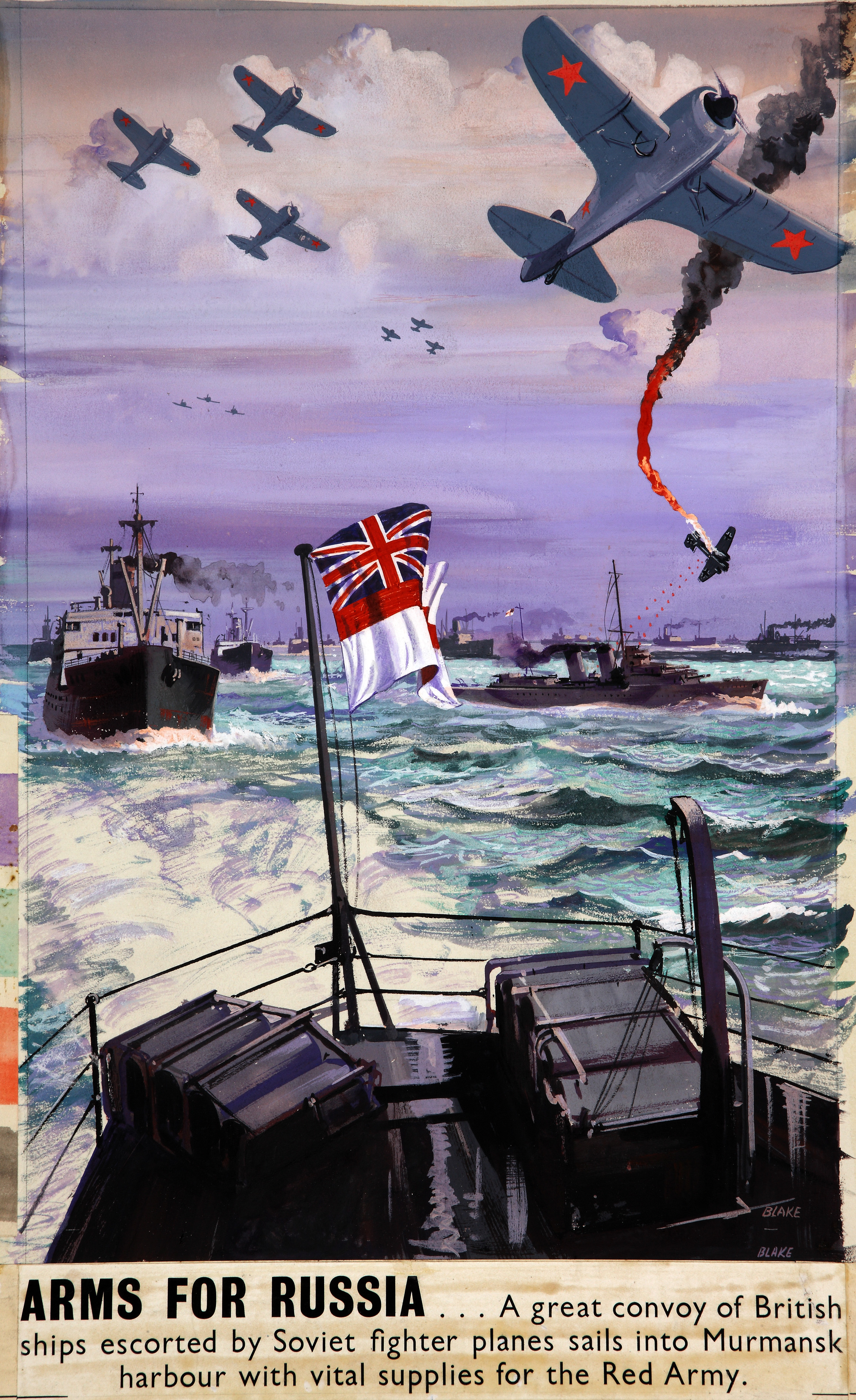
A British wartime poster about the Arctic convoys

The Dervish convoy assembled at Hvalfjörður, sailed on 21 August 1941 and reached Arkhangelsk ten days later. The convoy consisted of six merchant ships, Lancastrian Prince, New Westminster City, Esneh, Trehata, the elderly Llanstephan Castle, the fleet oiler RFA Aldersdale and the Dutch freighter Alchiba. The merchant ships were commanded by the convoy commodore Captain J. C. K. Dowding RNR. The escorts comprised the destroyers HMS Electra, Active and Impulsive, the Halcyon class minesweepers HMS Halcyon, Salamander and Harrier and the anti-submarine trawlers HMS Hamlet, Macbeth and Ophelia.

=== Convoy PQ 16 ===
On 30 May 1942, the surviving ships of Convoy PQ 16 arrived, most ships to Murmansk and eight to Arkhangelsk; the convoy was such a success in war stores delivered that the Germans made greater efforts against the following convoys. The crane ships from Convoy PQ 16, including SS Empire Elgar, stayed at Arkhangelsk and Molotovsk (now Severodvinsk) unloading ships for over 14 months.

=== Convoy PQ 17 ===
In July 1942, Convoy PQ 17 suffered the worst losses of any Allied convoy in the war. Under attack from German aircraft and U-boats, the convoy was ordered to scatter following reports that a battle group, that included the battleship Tirpitz, had sailed to intercept the convoy. The German group did not leave port until the following day and soon received orders to return. Only eleven of the 35 merchant ships in the convoy managed to run the gauntlet of U-boats and German bombers.

=== Battle of the Barents Sea ===
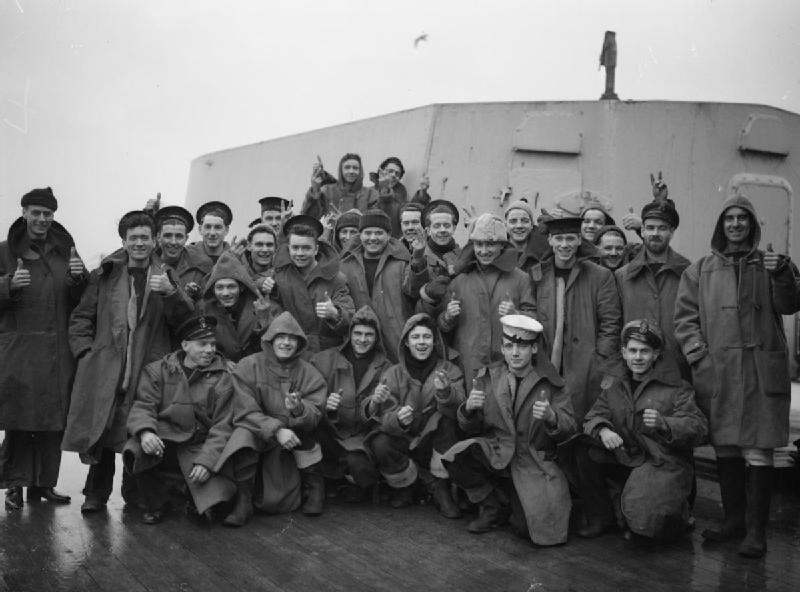
Gun crews of HMS Sheffield after the Battle of the North Cape

In December 1942, German surface forces, including the heavy cruiser Admiral Hipper and pocket battleship Lützow conducted Unternehmen Regenbogen an attack on Convoy JW 51B. The German force was driven off by a combined force of cruisers and destroyers in what became known as the Battle of the Barents Sea. The British lost a minesweeper and a destroyer and a German destroyer was also sunk; no ships were lost from the convoy .

=== Convoy JW 55B ===
In December 1943, Convoy JW 55B was attacked by the battleship Scharnhorst. Two British forces were in the area. In the Battle of the North Cape, Scharnhorst encountered British cruisers and was then sunk by Duke of York and her escorts in a night action, before it could return to port. German destroyers missed the convoy, that had been diverted north, based on intelligence from the Norwegian resistance.

== Literary depictions ==
The 1955 novel HMS Ulysses by Scottish writer Alistair MacLean, and the 1967 novel The Captain by Dutch author Jan de Hartog, are set during the Arctic convoys. The 1958 novel The Midnight Sea by Ian Cameron (pseudonym of Donald G. Payne, who was a Royal Navy Fleet Air Arm pilot during the convoys) is set during an Arctic convoy on the fictitious escort carrier HMS Viper in late 1944. The 1967 Norwegian historic account One in Ten Had to Die (Hver tiende mann måtte dø) by Per Hansson is based on the experience of the Norwegian sailor Leif Heimstad and other members of the Norwegian merchant fleet during the Second World War. The 1973 Russian novel Requiem for Convoy PQ-17 (Реквием каравану PQ-17) by Valentin Pikul depicts the mission of Convoy PQ 17.

== Commemorative associations and sites ==

The Russian Convoy Club was founded by veteran Bob Allan to unite the UK survivors of the convoys. Veteran associations also existed in the other nations whose citizens took part in the convoys. The only club still active is in New Zealand. In 1999, the Russian Convoy Club established a memorial on a promontory at the mouth of Loch Ewe to commemorate those who did not return from the Arctic Convoys. The Arctic Convoy Museum, dedicated to the story of the Arctic Convoys and commemorating the veterans is located in Aultbea.

== Tables ==
=== 1941 ===
Arctic convoys 21 August 1941 to 11 January 1942
OB	Notes	HB	Notes
Dervish	Hvalfjörður–Arkhangelsk, 21–31 August		
PQ 1	Hvalfjörður–Arkhangelsk, 29 September – 11 October	QP 1	Arkhangelsk–Scapa Flow, 28 September – 10 October
PQ 2	Liverpool–Arkhangelsk, 13–30 October		
PQ 3	Hvalfjörður–Arkhangelsk, 9–22 November	QP 2	Arkhangelsk–Kirkwall, 3–17 November
PQ 4	Hvalfjörður–Arkhangelsk, 17–28 November		
PQ 5	Hvalfjörður–Arkhangelsk, 27 November – 13 December	QP 3	Arkhangelsk – dispersed, 27 November – 3 December
PQ 6	Hvalfjörður–Murmansk, 8–20 December 1941		
PQ 7a	Hvalfjörður–Murmansk, 26 December – 12 January 1942	QP 4	Arkhangelsk – dispersed, 29 December – 9 January
PQ 7b	Hvalfjörður–Murmansk, 31 December – 11 January		

=== 1942 ===
Arctic convoys 8 January – 25 December 1942
Ob	Notes	HB	Notes
PQ 8	Hvalfjörður–Arkhangelsk, 8–17 January	QP 5	Murmansk – dispersed, 13–19 January
PQ 9/PQ 10	Reykjavík–Murmansk, 1–10 February	QP 6	Murmansk–dispersed, 24–28 January
PQ 11	Loch Ewe–Kirkwall–Murmansk, 7–14–22 February	QP 7	Murmansk – dispersed, 12–15 February
PQ 12	Reykjavík–Murmansk, 1–12 March	QP 8	Murmansk–Reykjavík, 1–11 March
PQ 13	Reykjavík–Murmansk, 20–31 March	QP 9	Kola Inlet–Reykjavík, 21 March – 3 April
PQ 14	Oban–Murmansk, 26 March – 19 April	QP 10	Kola Inlet–Reykjavík, 10–21 April
PQ 15	Oban–Murmansk, 10 April – 5 May	QP 11	Murmansk–Reykjavík, 28 April – 7 May
PQ 16	Reykjavík–Murmansk, 21–30 May	QP 12	Kola Inlet–Reykjavík, 21–29 May
PQ 17	Reykjavik – dispersed, 27 June – 4 July	QP 13	Arkhangelsk–Reykjavík, 26 June – 7 July
August sailing postponed
PQ 18	Loch Ewe–Arkhangelsk, 2–21 September (Note: First Arctic convoy to be accompanied by an aircraft carrier, (HMS Avenger).)	QP 14	Arkhangelsk–Loch Ewe 13–26 September
PQ cycle terminated
		QP 15	Kola–Loch Ewe, 17–30 November
FB	Independent sailings, 29 October – 9 November		
QP convoys ended
JW 51A	Liverpool–Kola, 15–25 December		
JW 51B	Liverpool–Kola, 22 December – 4 January 1943, Barents Sea	RA 51	Kola–Loch Ewe, 30 December – 11 January

=== 1943 ===
Arctic convoys 17 January 1943 – 8 January 1944
OB	Notes	HB	Notes
JW 52	Liverpool–Kola Inlet, 17–27 January	RA 52	Kola Inlet–Loch Ewe, 29 January – 9 February
JW 53	Liverpool–Kola Inlet, 15–27 February	RA 53	Kola Inlet–Loch Ewe, 1–14 March
Convoys postponed
JW 54A	Liverpool–Kola Inlet, 15–24 November	RA 54A	Kola Inlet–Loch Ewe, 1–14 November
JW 54B	Liverpool–Arkhangelsk, 22 November – 3 December	RA 54B	Arkhangelsk–Loch Ewe, 26 November – 9 December
JW 55A	Liverpool–Arkhangelsk, 12–22 December	RA 55A	Kola Inlet–Loch Ewe, 22 December – 1 January 1944
JW 55B	Liverpool–Arkhangelsk, 20–30 December (Note: Battle of the North Cape (26 December 1943))	RA 55B	Kola Inlet–Loch Ewe, 31 December – 8 January

=== 1944 ===
Arctic convoys 12 January 1944 – 21 January 1945
OB	Notes	HB	Notes
JW 56A	Liverpool–Arkhangelsksk, 12–28 January		
JW 56B	Liverpool–Kola Inlet, 22 January – 1 February	RA 56	Kola Inlet–Loch Ewe, 3–11 February
JW 57	Liverpool–Kola Inlet, 20–28 February	RA 57	Kola Inlet–Loch Ewe, 2–10 March
JW 58	Liverpool–Kola Inlet, 27 March – 4 April	RA 58	Kola Inlet–Loch Ewe, 7–14 April
	Escorts only to Murmansk	RA 59	Kola Inlet–Loch Ewe, 28 April – 6 May
Convoys postponed
JW 59	Liverpool–Kola Inlet, 15–25 August	RA 59A	Kola Inlet–Loch Ewe, 28 August – 5 September
JW 60	Liverpool–Kola Inlet, 15–23 September	RA 60	Kola Inlet–Loch Ewe, 28 September – 5 October
JW 61	Liverpool–Kola Inlet, 20–28 October	RA 61	Kola Inlet–Loch Ewe, 2–9 November
JW 61A	Liverpool–Murmansk, 31 October – 6 November	RA 61A	Kola Inlet–Loch Ewe, 11–17 November
JW 62	Loch Ewe–Kola Inlet, 29 November – 7 December	RA 62	Kola Inlet–Loch Ewe, 10–19 December
JW 63	Loch Ewe–Kola Inlet, 30 December – 8 January 1945	RA 63	Kola Inlet–Loch Ewe, 11–21 January

=== 1945 ===
Arctic convoys 17 February – 30 May 1945
OB	Notes	HB	Notes
JW 64	Clyde–Kola Inlet, 3–15 February	RA 64	Kola Inlet−Loch Ewe, 17–28 February
JW 65	Clyde–Kola Inlet, 11–21 March	RA 65	Kola Inlet–Loch Ewe, 23 March – 1 April
JW 66	Clyde–Kola Inlet, 16–25 April	RA 66	Kola Inlet–Clyde, 29 April – 8 May
JW 67	Clyde–Kola Inlet, 12–20 May	RA 67	Kola Inlet–Clyde, 23–30 May
Convoy sailings ceased at midnight 28/29 May 1945

=== Convoy details ===
PQ convoys
Convoys	1941	1942	1943	1944	1945	Total	Tonnage
PQ/JW	8	13	6	9	4	40	
Ships	64	256	112	284	95	811	5,200,000 sent
QP/RA	4	13	6	9	5	37	
Ships	49	188	93	249	136	715	4,500,000 arr.

=== Deliveries 1941–1945 ===
Cargo to USSR, 22 June 1941 − 20 September 1945
Route	GT sent	% Arr	% lost
North Russia	3,964,000	93	7
Persian Gulf	4,160,000	96	4
Black Sea	681,000	99	1
Far East	8,244,000	99	1
Soviet Arctic	452,000	100	0
Arr. UK–USSR	343,000	—	—
Totals	17,501,000	16,587,000	488,000

=== Ship losses ===
Merchant ship losses
Sunk	UK	US	Panama	USSR	Holland	Norway	Total	GRT
Outbound	21	29	5	2	1	0	58	353,366
Return	6	15	2	5	0	1	29	178,317
Independent	3	1	0	2	0	0	6	42,002
Port	3	2	0	0	0	0	5	27,278
Other	2	0	0	0	0	0	2	4,872
Total	35	47	7	9	1	1	100	604,837

=== Convoy losses by cause ===
Ships lost in convoy
Cause	Out	Ret'n	Escorted
Ship	1	2	0
U-boat	23	18	24
Bomb	17	2	9
Torpedo	17	1	17
Mine	0	5	5
Foundered	0	1	1
Wrecked	0	0	0
Total	58	29	56

Independents
Cause	Straggler	Out	Ret'n
Ship	3	0	1
U-boat	17	4	0
Bomb	10	0	0
Torpedo	1	0	0
Mine	0	0	0
Foundered	0	0	0
Wrecked	0	1	0
Total	31	5	1

=== Allied warship losses ===
Losses
Ship	Flag	Type	Notes
HMS Edinburgh	Royal Navy	Town-class cruiser	Torpedoed, 30 April 1942 U-456, scuttled Foresight
HMS Trinidad	Royal Navy	Fiji-class cruiser	Torpedo, 29 March 1942, bombed 14 May, scuttled
HMS Matabele	Royal Navy	Tribal-class destroyer	Torpedoed, 17 January 1944, U-454
HMS Punjabi	Royal Navy	Tribal-class destroyer	Rammed, 1 May 1942, HMS King George V
HMS Somali	Royal Navy	Tribal-class destroyer	Torpedoed, 20 September 1942, U-703, sank 24/9
HMS Achates	Royal Navy	A-class destroyer	Capsized, 31 December 1942, battle damage
Sokrushitelny	Soviet Navy	Gnevny-class destroyer	Foundered, 22 November 1942
HMS Mahratta	Royal Navy	M-class destroyer	Torpedoed, 25 February 1942, U-990
HMS Hardy	Royal Navy	V-class destroyer	Torpedoed, 30 January 1944, scuttled Venus
HMS Kite	Royal Navy	Black Swan-class sloop	Torpedoed, 21 August 1944, U-344
HMS Lark	Royal Navy	Black Swan-class sloop	Torpedoed, 17 February 1945, U-968, towed Kola
HMS Lapwing	Royal Navy	Black Swan-class sloop	Torpedoed, 20 March 1943, U-968
HMS Goodall	Royal Navy	Captain-class frigate	Torpedoed, 29 March 1945, U-968
HMS Bluebell	Royal Navy	Flower-class corvette	Torpedoed, 17 February 1945, U-711
HMS Denbigh Castle	Royal Navy	Flower-class corvette	Torpedoed, 13 February 1945, U-992, towed Kola
HNoMS Tunsberg Castle	Royal Norwegian Navy	Flower-class corvette	Mined 12 December 1944
HMS Bramble	Royal Navy	Halcyon-class minesweeper	Sunk, 21 December 1942, Hipper, Friedrich Eckoldt
HMS Gossamer	Royal Navy	Halcyon-class minesweeper	Bombed, 24 June 1942, Kola Inlet
HMS Leda	Royal Navy	Halcyon-class minesweeper	Torpedoed, 20 September 1942, U-435
HMS Niger	Royal Navy	Halcyon-class minesweeper	British minefield, 5 July 1942
ORP Jastrząb	Polish Navy	US S-boat	Sunk, 2 May 1942 St Albans, Seagull in error
HMS Shera	Royal Navy	Admiralty MS whaler	Iced, capsized, 9 March 1942

== German losses ==
=== Ships ===
Kriegsmarine ship losses
Ship	Flag	Type	Sunk
Scharnhorst	Kriegsmarine	Scharnhorst-class battleship	26 December 1943, Home Fleet
Friedrich Eckoldt	Kriegsmarine	Type 1934A-class destroyer	31 December 1942, Sheffield
Bremse	Kriegsmarine	Training ship	7 September 1941, Nigeria, Aurora
Ulm	Kriegsmarine	minelayer	25 August 1942, Marne, Martin, Onslaught

=== U-boats ===
U-boats sunk
Boat	Flag	Type	Sunk
U-88	Kriegsmarine	Type VIIC submarine	14 September 1942, Faulknor, Swordfish 825 NAS
U-286	Kriegsmarine	Type VIIC submarine	29 April 1945, Anguilla, Cotton, Loch Shin
U-277	Kriegsmarine	Type VIIC submarine	1 May 1944, Swordfish ASW
U-288	Kriegsmarine	Type VIIC submarine	3 April 1944, ASW aircraft
U-307	Kriegsmarine	Type VIIC submarine	29 April 1945, Cygnet, Loch Inish, Loch Shin
U-314	Kriegsmarine	Type VIIC submarine	30 January 1944, Meteor, Whitehall
U-344	Kriegsmarine	Type VIIC submarine	22 August 1944, Swordfish 835 NAS
U-347	Kriegsmarine	Type VIIC submarine	17 July 1944, Catalina, 210 Squadron
U-354	Kriegsmarine	Type VIIC submarine	24/8/44, Keppel, Loch Shin, Mermaid, Peacock, Swordfish, 825 NAS
U-355	Kriegsmarine	Type VIIC submarine	1 March 1944, Beagle, Avenger, Tracker
U-360	Kriegsmarine	Type VIIC submarine	2 April 1944, Keppel
U-361	Kriegsmarine	Type VIIC submarine	17 July 1944, Catalina, 210 Squadron
U-365	Kriegsmarine	Type VIIC submarine	13 December 1944, Swordfish 813 NAS
U-366	Kriegsmarine	Type VIIC submarine	5 March 1944, Swordfish 816 NAS
U-387	Kriegsmarine	Type VIIC submarine	9 December 1944, Bamborough Castle
U-394	Kriegsmarine	Type VIIC submarine	2/9/44, Keppel, Whitehall, Mermaid, Peacock, Swordfish 825 NAS
U-425	Kriegsmarine	Type VIIC submarine	17 February 1945, Alnwick Castle, Lark
U-457	Kriegsmarine	Type VIIC submarine	16 September 1942, Impulsive
U-472	Kriegsmarine	Type VIIC submarine	4 March 1944, Onslaught, Swordfish 816 NAS
U-585	Kriegsmarine	Type VIIC submarine	30 March 1942, mined off Murmansk
U-589	Kriegsmarine	Type VIIC submarine	14 September 1942, Onslow, Swordfish 825 NAS
U-601	Kriegsmarine	Type VIIC submarine	25 February 1944, Catalina 210 Squadron
U-644	Kriegsmarine	Type VIIC submarine	7 April 1943, Tuna (British T-class submarine)
U-655	Kriegsmarine	Type VIIC submarine	24 March 1942, Sharpshooter
U-674	Kriegsmarine	Type VIIC submarine	2 May 1944, Swordfish 842 NAS
U-713	Kriegsmarine	Type VIIC submarine	21 February 1944, Keppel
U-742	Kriegsmarine	Type VIIC submarine	18 July 1942, Catalina 210 Squadron
U-921	Kriegsmarine	Type VIIC submarine	30 September 1944, 813 NAS
U-959	Kriegsmarine	Type VIIC submarine	2 May 1944, Swordfish 842 NAS
U-961	Kriegsmarine	Type VIIC submarine	29 March 1944, Starling
U-973	Kriegsmarine	Type VIIC submarine	6 March 1944, Swordfish 816 NAS

== See also ==
- Arctic Ocean operations of World War II
- Arctic Star
- List of merchant ships lost in Convoy PQ 17
- Northwest Staging Route
- Unternehmen Sportpalast
- Unternehmen Rösselsprung
- Unternehmen Doppelschlag
- Unternehmen Wunderland

== Bibliography ==
- Boyd, Andrew (2024). Arms for Russia & the Naval War in the Arctic 1941–1945. Barnsley: Seaforth (Pen & Sword). ISBN 978-1-3990-3886-7.
- Budiansky, S. (2000). Battle of Wits: The Complete Story of Codebreaking in World War II. New York: The Free Press (Simon & Schuster). ISBN 0-684-85932-7 – via the Internet Archive.
- Cameron, Ian (1958). The Midnight Sea. London: Hutchinson. OCLC 752799216.
- Edgerton, D. (2011). Britain's War Machine: Weapons, Resources and Experts in the Second World War. London: Allen Lane. ISBN 978-0-7139-9918-1.
- Hansson, Per (1967). Hver tiende mann måtte dø : fra konvoifarten under siste krig [Every tenth Man had to Die: From the Convoy Operations During the last War]. Oslo: Gyldendal Norsk Forlag. pp. 1−199. OCLC 476426112.
- Hartog, Jan de (1967). The Captain. New York: Atheneum. OCLC 762657725.
- Hill, Alexander (2006). "The Allocation of Allied 'Lend-Lease' Aid to the Soviet Union Arriving with Convoy PQ 12, March 1942 — a State Defense Committee Decree". The Journal of Slavic Military Studies. 19 (4): 727–738. doi:10.1080/13518040601028545. ISSN 1351-8046. S2CID 144712146.
- Hinsley, F. H. (1994) [1993]. British Intelligence in the Second World War: Its Influence on Strategy and Operations. History of the Second World War (2nd rev. abridged ed.). London: HMSO. ISBN 978-0-11-630961-7 – via Archive Foundation.
- Howard, M. (1972). Grand Strategy: August 1942 – September 1943. History of the Second World War United Kingdom Military Series. Vol. IV. London: HMSO. ISBN 978-0-11-630075-1.
- Kemp, Paul (1993). Convoy: Drama in Arctic Waters. London: Arms and Armour. ISBN 978-1-85409-130-7 – via the Internet Archive.
- Kahn, D. (1973) [1967]. The Codebreakers: The Story of Secret Writing (10th abr. Signet, Chicago ed.). New York: Macmillan. LCCN 63-16109. OCLC 78083316.
- MacLean, Alistair (1955). HMS Ulysses. London: Collins. pp. 1−350. OCLC 1063278386.
- Macksey, K. (2004) [2003]. The Searchers: Radio Intercept in Two World Wars (Cassell Military Paperback ed.). London: Cassells. ISBN 978-0-304-36651-4.
- Motter, T. H. Vail (1952). The Persian Corridor and Aid to Russia. Washington, DC: US Government Printing Office. OCLC 459693332.
- Paperno, Alla (2019). "The Unknown World War II in the Northern Pacific". lend-lease.net.
- Pikul, Valentin (1987) [1973]. Rekviem karavanu PQ-17: Dokumentalʹnaja tragedija [Requiem for Convoy PQ-17: A documentary Tragedy]. Moskva: Sovetskaja Rossija. pp. 1–272. OCLC 1534649563.
- Roskill, S. W. (1962) [1956]. The Period of Balance. History of the Second World War: The War at Sea 1939–1945. Vol. II (3rd ed.). London: HMSO. OCLC 174453986.
- Ruegg, R.; Hague, A. (1993) [1992]. Convoys to Russia: Allied Convoys and Naval Surface Operations in Arctic Waters 1941–1945 (2nd rev. enl. ed.). Kendal: World Ship Society. ISBN 0-905617-66-5.
- Sebag-Montefiore, Hugh (2001) [2000]. Enigma: The Battle for the Code (4th pbk. Phoenix ed.). Weidenfeld & Nicolson. ISBN 978-0-7538-1130-6.
- Smith, William (2023). Allied convoys to Northern Russia 1941–1945: Politics, Strategy and Tactics. Barnsley: Pen & Sword Maritime. ISBN 978-1-39905-473-7.
- Woodman, Richard (1994). Arctic Convoys 1941–1945 (Hardback ed.). London: John Murray. ISBN 0-7195-5079-3.
- Woodman, Richard (2004) [1994]. Arctic Convoys 1941–1945 (pbk. ed.). London: John Murray. ISBN 978-0-7195-6617-2.
