= K130 =

K130, or similar, may refer to:

- K-130 (Kansas highway), a state highway in Kansas
- Braunschweig-class corvette, a class of German Navy corvettes also known as the K130 class
- HMS Lotus (K130), a former UK Royal Navy ship
- Symphony No. 18 (Mozart) in F major, by Mozart
