= Pompholoogopaphlasmasin =

Expression used during WW2

Pompholoogopaphlasmasin was an expression used during World War II by a Royal Navy captain in a signal reporting on an action in the Mediterranean.

== The action ==
In November 1942 HMS Lotus was operating in support of Operation Torch. On 13 November she and HMS Poppy made an ASDIC contact on a submerged U-boat off the coast of Algeria. They attacked with depth charges and were rewarded with sounds of the vessel breaking up underwater. Lt. HJ Hall, the captain of Lotus, described this sound in his report with the Greek expression pompholoogopaphlasmasin, quoting "an onomatopeic line from Aristophanes". When the Admiralty received this, they were taken with it, and had the report circulated with the appropriate explanation.

== The signal ==
The expression pompholoogopaphlasmasin is derived from the play The Frogs, by the 5th century BC playwright Aristophanes.

(Classical Greek)

"ή Διος φεύγεντες ομβρον
ενύδρον εν Βύφο χορειαν
αιολαν εφθεγςαμεσθα
πομφολύγοπαφλασμασιν"

(transliteration)

"he Dios pheugentes ombron
enudron en Bupho choreian
aiolan ephthegxamestha
pompholugopaphlasmasin"

(English)

"Or when fleeing the storm, we went
Down to the depths and our choral song
Wildly raised to a loud and long
Bubble-bursting accompaniment"

== The outcome ==
Postwar analysis credited Lotus and Poppy with the destruction of U-605. However, this assessment was later changed, as further research determined in 1987 that the attack on 13 November had been directed at U-77 (which survived, with little damage) while U-605 had been destroyed on a different occasion the following day.
