= HMS Denbigh Castle =

British Castle-class corvettes

Coordinates: 69°20′N 33°33′E

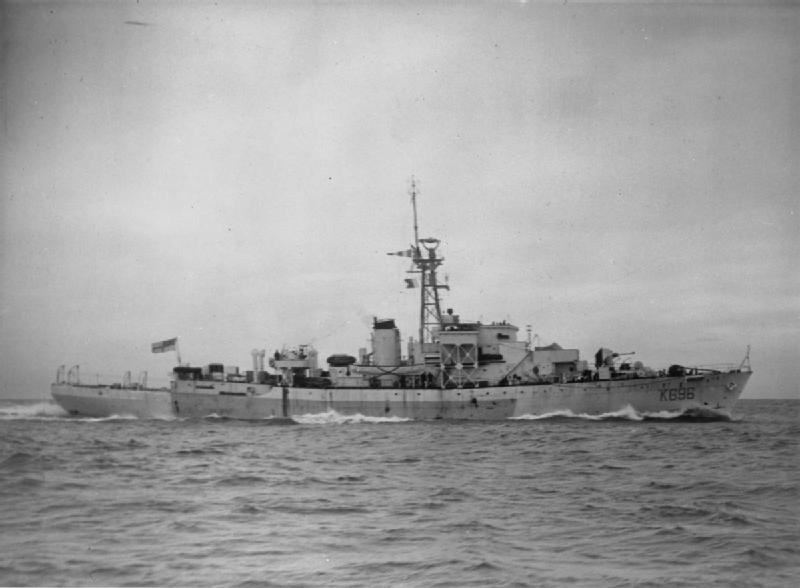
- Denbigh Castle underway, 1945

History

United Kingdom
- Name: Denbigh Castle
- Namesake: Denbigh Castle
- Ordered: 19 December 1942
- Builder: John Lewis & Sons, Aberdeen
- Laid down: 30 September 1943
- Launched: 5 August 1944
- Completed: 30 December 1944
- Identification: Pennant number: K696
- Honours and awards: Arctic 1945
- Fate: Torpedoed 13 February 1945; Declared a total loss

General characteristics
- Class & type: Castle-class corvette
- Displacement: 1,010 long tons (1,030 t) (standard); 1,510 long tons (1,530 t) (deep load)
- Length: 252 ft (76.8 m)
- Beam: 33 ft (10.1 m)
- Draught: 14 ft (4.3 m)
- Installed power: 2 Admiralty 3-drum boilers; 2,880 ihp (2,150 kW)
- Propulsion: 2 shafts, 2 geared steam turbines
- Speed: 16.5 knots (30.6 km/h; 19.0 mph)
- Range: 6,500 nmi (12,000 km; 7,500 mi) at 15 knots (28 km/h; 17 mph)
- Complement: 99
- Sensors & processing systems: Type 145 and Type 147 ASDIC; Type 277 search radar; HF/DF radio direction finder
- Armament: 1 × single 4 in (102 mm) gun; 2 × twin, 2 × single 20 mm (0.8 in) AA guns; 1 × 3-barrel Squid anti-submarine mortar; 15 × depth charges, 1 rack and 2 throwers

HMS Denbigh Castle (K696) was one of 44 Castle-class corvettes built for the Royal Navy during World War II. The ship was completed at the end of 1944 and was assigned to the 7th Escort Group at the beginning of 1945. While escorting her first and only Arctic convoy to Russia, she claimed to have shot down a German torpedo bomber. Denbigh Castle was torpedoed in early 1945 by the German submarine U-992, with the loss of 11 men, near the Soviet coast. The ship was beached in an effort to save her, but she was pulled off by the ebbing tide and capsized. Her wreck was declared a total loss.

== Design and description ==
The Castle-class corvette was a stretched version of the preceding Flower class, enlarged to improve seakeeping and to accommodate modern weapons. The ships displaced 1,010 long tons (1,030 t) at standard load and 1,510 long tons (1,530 t) at deep load. They had an overall length of 252 feet (76.8 m), a beam of 36 feet 9 inches (11.2 m) and a deep draught of 14 feet (4.3 m). They were powered by a pair of triple-expansion steam engines, each driving one propeller shaft using steam provided by two Admiralty three-drum boilers. The engines developed a total of 2,880 indicated horsepower (2,150 kW) and gave a maximum speed of 16.5 knots (30.6 km/h; 19.0 mph). The Castles carried enough fuel oil to give them a range of 6,500 nautical miles (12,000 km; 7,500 mi) at 15 knots (28 km/h; 17 mph). The ships' complement was 99 officers and ratings.

The Castle-class ships were equipped with a single QF 4-inch (102 mm) Mk XVI gun forward, but their primary weapon was their single three-barrel Squid anti-submarine mortar. This was backed up by one depth charge rail and two throwers for 15 depth charges. The ships were fitted with two twin and a pair of single mounts for 20-millimetre (0.8 in) Oerlikon light AA guns. Provision was made for a further four single mounts if needed. They were equipped with Type 145Q and Type 147B ASDIC sets to detect submarines by reflections from sound waves beamed into the water. A Type 277 search radar and a HF/DF radio direction finder rounded out the Castles' sensor suite.

== Construction and career ==
Denbigh Castle, the only ship of her name to serve in the Royal Navy, was ordered on 19 December 1942 and laid down by John Lewis & Sons at their shipyard in Aberdeen, Scotland, on 30 September 1943. The ship was launched on 5 August 1944 and completed on 30 December 1944. She arrived at Tobermory, Mull, Scotland, on 12 January 1945 to begin training at the Royal Navy's Anti-Submarine Training School, HMS Western Isles. Having completed training, Denbigh Castle arrived at Scapa Flow on 29 January to join the 7th Escort Group.

Commanded by Lieutenant Commander Graham Butcher, the ship escorted Convoy JW 64 to Murmansk at the beginning of February. On the 7th, Denbigh Castle claimed to have shot down a German torpedo bomber. Almost a week later, the ship was torpedoed by U-992 as the convoy entered the Kola Inlet at 00:13 on 13 February; the corvette's radar had picked up the submarine at a range of 2,500 yards (2,300 m), but had not identified her due to the confused radar returns and darkness. The torpedo struck the bow and the crew thought that the ship had struck a mine. The explosion killed eleven ratings and threw the four-inch gun onto the Squid platform behind it. The remaining bow structure sagged downwards, although Denbigh Castle was in no danger of sinking. The destroyer Serapis transferred her medical officer over and the corvette Bluebell came alongside around 00:45 to receive casualties, and Butcher ordered as many ratings aboard her as he thought he could spare. Bluebell began towing Denbigh Castle at 02:05 and reached a maximum speed of 2 knots (3.7 km/h; 2.3 mph), Serapis screening the ships during the tow.

The Soviet salvage ship Buresvestnik came alongside at 04:30 to transfer a 100-tonne (98-long-ton) salvage pump as the corvette was still taking on water. At 05:01, Butcher ordered all remaining hands aboard the Soviet ship because Denbigh Castle was slowly sinking by the bow, only the officers remaining aboard. Buresvestnik's captain, not wanting the corvette to founder in the channel, took over the tow at 06:15, by which time her stern was nearly out of the water. Denbigh Castle was beached at 07:30 at Bolshaya Volokovaya Bay near Vaenga; Buresvestnik then pushed her stern around. The ship began to slowly list with the ebbing tide and the officers abandoned her at 09:05; five minutes later she capsized and slid into deeper water. The intense cold made later efforts to retrieve or destroy secret documents and equipment still aboard extremely difficult, but the diving team from the light cruiser Bellona did manage to demolish the radar office. In recognition of her service, Denbigh Castle was awarded the battle honour Arctic 1945.

== Bibliography ==
- Chesneau, Roger, ed. (1980). Conway's All the World's Fighting Ships 1922–1946. Greenwich, UK: Conway Maritime Press. ISBN 0-85177-146-7.
- Colledge, J. J.; Warlow, Ben (2006) [1969]. Ships of the Royal Navy: The Complete Record of All Fighting Ships of the Royal Navy from the 15th Century to the Present (3rd Rev ed.). London: Chatham Publishing. ISBN 978-1-86176-281-8. OCLC 67375475.
- Goodwin, Norman (2007). Castle Class Corvettes: An Account of the Service of the Ships and of Their Ships' Companies. Liskeard, UK: Maritime Books. ISBN 978-1-904459-27-9.
- Lenton, H. T. (1998). British & Empire Warships of the Second World War. Annapolis, Maryland: Naval Institute Press. ISBN 1-55750-048-7.
- Rohwer, Jürgen (2005). Chronology of the War at Sea 1939–1945: The Naval History of World War Two (Third Revised ed.). Annapolis, Maryland: Naval Institute Press. ISBN 1-59114-119-2.
