= HMS Lotus (K130) =

1942 Royal Navy Flower-class corvette

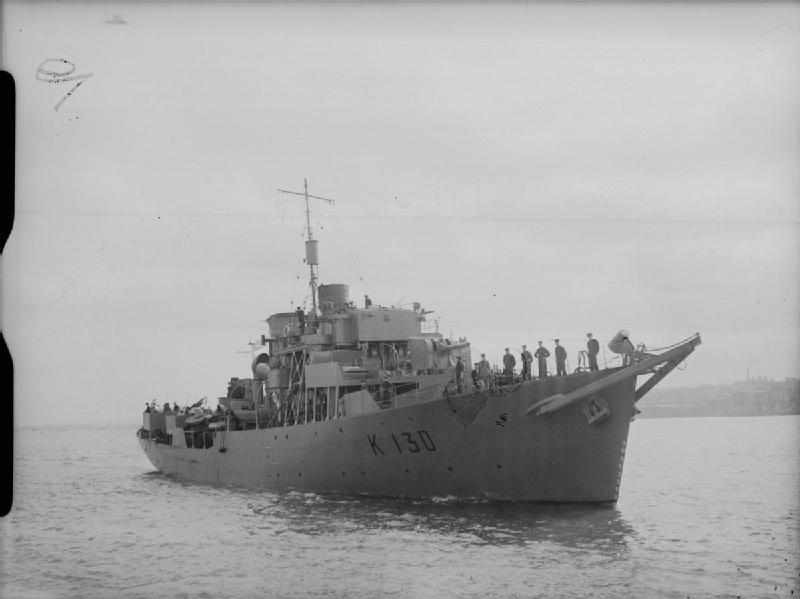
- Lotus at Tilbury, Essex in October 1942

History

United Kingdom
- Name: HMS Lotus
- Builder: Henry Robb Limited, Leith, Scotland
- Launched: 16 January 1942
- Commissioned: May 1942
- Out of service: Sold 1947
- Renamed: Launched as HMS Phlox, renamed HMS Lotus in April 1942
- Identification: Pennant number: K130
- Fate: Sold in 1947 for mercantile use. Wrecked on 18 December 1966

General characteristics
- Class & type: Flower-class corvette
- Displacement: 925 long tons (940 t)
- Length: 205 ft (62 m)
- Beam: 33 ft (10 m)
- Draught: 11.5 ft (3.5 m)
- Propulsion: Two fire tube boilers; one 4-cycle triple-expansion steam engine
- Speed: 16 knots (30 km/h) at 2,750 hp (2,050 kW)
- Range: 3,500 nautical miles at 12 knots (6,500 km at 22 km/h)
- Complement: 85
- Armament: 1 × BL 4 in (102 mm) Mk IX gun; 2 × .50 in (12.7 mm) twin machine guns, 2 × .303 in (7.7 mm) Lewis machine guns; 2 × stern depth charge racks with 40 depth charges

HMS Lotus was a Flower-class corvette that served in the Royal Navy.

She was built by Henry Robb Limited, of Leith, Scotland and launched on 16 January 1942. Originally named HMS Phlox, she was renamed in April 1942 after the previous HMS Lotus was transferred to the Free French Navy. She was commissioned in May 1942.

== Service career ==
Lotus commissioned in May 1942, and was assigned to escort duty on the Arctic convoy route. In June she sailed with the ill-fated Convoy PQ 17. After the convoy scattered, Lotus accompanied Pozarica and several other ships to Novaya Zemlya, before setting out on her captain's initiative to search for survivors. She was able to rescue 38 men from SS River Afton, including Jack Dowding, the convoy commodore, and 29 from the US-American SS Pan Kraft, that had been disabled by German bombers. Returning to Matochkin, Lotus and her companions escorted the eight ships there to Archangel, arriving on 11 July, although two were sunk by aircraft before reaching port. From Archangel, and with two other ships under the leadership of Comm. Dowling, Lotus helped to find and escort six more ships in the White Sea, and brought them to Archangel. She returned to Britain in September 1942 with Convoy QP 14.

On her return Lotus was assigned, with the Arctic corvettes Dianella, Poppy and Starwort, to escort duties in the Mediterranean, in support of Operation Torch, the Allied invasion of North Africa. These four corvettes served together for the remainder of the war at sea.

In late 1942 Lotus was operating in the Mediterranean Sea, where on 12 November, in company with Starwort, she attacked and destroyed U-660 off Oran. The following day Lotus and Poppy attacked an underwater contact off Algiers and were rewarded with the sounds of a U-boat breaking up, which Lotus's captain, Lieutenant Commander HJ Hall, reported in an erudite signal to the Admiralty. Their lordships were so taken with the message that it was circulated throughout the fleet.

Postwar analysis credited Lotus and Poppy with the destruction of U-605, although a reassessment in 1987 decided their attack had been against U-77 which escaped with damage.

Lotus and her companions returned to the northern route in December 1942, serving with several Arctic convoys until the spring of 1943. In the summer of 1943, Lotus and her consorts were in the Mediterranean once more, on the Mediterranean leg of the KMS/MKS and GU/UG routes. That winter in 1943/4, Lotus and the corvettes were again in the Arctic, escorting JW/RA convoys, until the spring of 1944, when they transferred to the North Atlantic. They remained on this assignment, escorting HX, SC and ON convoys until the end of the war.

== Postwar career ==
Lotus survived the Second World War, and served with the Royal Navy until 1947. That year she was put up for sale and bought by Christian Salvesen Ltd. She became the merchant vessel Southern Lotus. She was refitted as a buoy tender at Smith's Dock in 1948 and later used as a whaler until 1963. She was towed from Leith Harbour to Melsomvik in the spring of 1963 and laid up. She was sold in December 1966 for breaking up in Belgium and towed, together with the Southern Briar (formerly HMS Cyclamen) by the tug Temi III. The towing wire broke on 18 December in stormy weather, causing both ships to ground and be wrecked off Jutland.
