= German submarine U-992 =

German World War II submarine

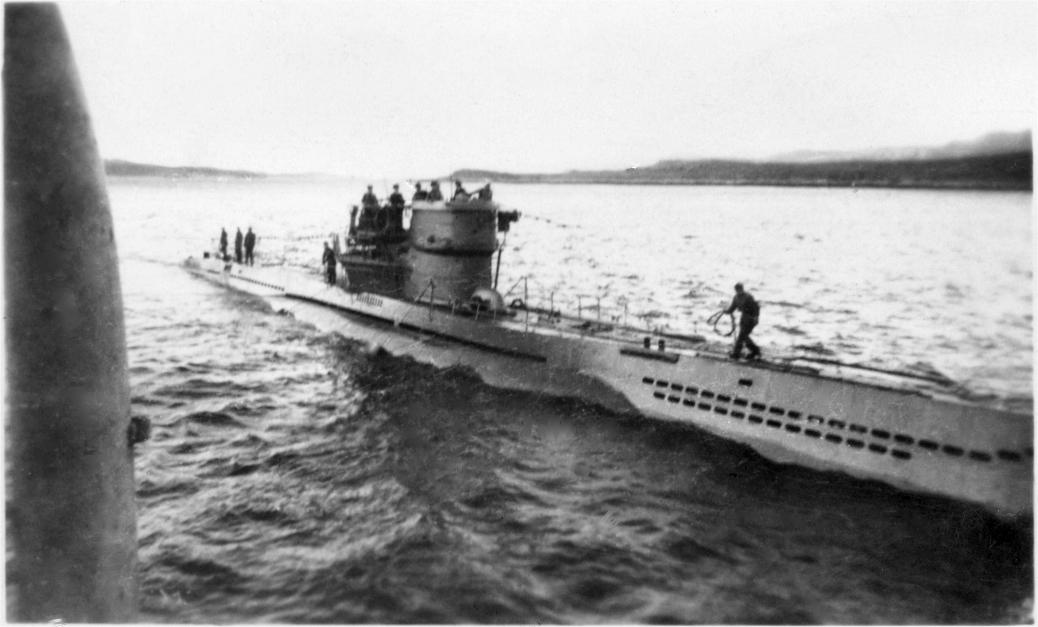
- U-992 surrendered to HMCS Nene in May 1945

History

Nazi Germany
- Name: U-992
- Ordered: 25 May 1941
- Builder: Blohm & Voss, Hamburg
- Yard number: 192
- Laid down: 30 October 1942
- Launched: 24 June 1943
- Commissioned: 2 August 1943
- Fate: Surrendered at Narvik, Norway on 9 May 1945; Sunk on 16 December 1945 during Operation Deadlight

General characteristics
- Class & type: Type VIIC submarine
- Displacement: 769 tonnes (757 long tons) surfaced; 871 t (857 long tons) submerged
- Length: 67.10 m (220 ft 2 in) o/a; 50.50 m (165 ft 8 in) pressure hull
- Beam: 6.20 m (20 ft 4 in) o/a; 4.70 m (15 ft 5 in) pressure hull
- Draught: 4.74 m (15 ft 7 in)
- Installed power: 2,800–3,200 PS (2,100–2,400 kW; 2,800–3,200 bhp) (diesels); 750 PS (550 kW; 740 shp) (electric)
- Propulsion: 2 shafts; 2 × diesel engines; 2 × electric motors
- Speed: 17.7 knots (32.8 km/h; 20.4 mph) surfaced; 7.6 knots (14.1 km/h; 8.7 mph) submerged
- Range: 8,500 nmi (15,700 km; 9,800 mi) at 10 knots (19 km/h; 12 mph) surfaced; 80 nmi (150 km; 92 mi) at 4 knots (7.4 km/h; 4.6 mph) submerged
- Test depth: 230 m (750 ft); Crush depth: 250–295 m (820–968 ft)
- Complement: 4 officers, 40–56 enlisted
- Armament: 5 × 53.3 cm (21 in) torpedo tubes (4 bow, 1 stern); 14 × torpedoes or 26 TMA mines; 1 × 8.8 cm (3.46 in) deck gun (220 rounds); 1 × twin 2 cm (0.79 in) C/30 anti-aircraft gun

Service record
- Part of: 5th U-boat Flotilla; 2 August 1943 – 29 February 1944; 3rd U-boat Flotilla; 1 March – 31 May 1944; 11th U-boat Flotilla; 1 June – 30 September 1944; 13th U-boat Flotilla; 1 October 1944 – 8 May 1945
- Identification codes: M 54 132
- Commanders: Oblt.z.S. Hans Falke; 2 August 1943 – 9 May 1945
- Operations: 8 patrols: 1st patrol: a. 18 June – 24 July 1944; b. 21 – 24 August 1944; 2nd patrol: a. 29 August – 6 September 1944; b. 6 – 7 September 1944; 3rd patrol: a. 12 September – 3 October 1944; b. 3 – 4 October 1944; 4th patrol: 18 October – 10 November 1944; 5th patrol: 30 November – 8 December 1944; 6th patrol: 16 January – 21 February 1945; 7th patrol: 17 March – 1 April 1945; 8th patrol: a. 1 – 9 May 1945; b. 12 May 1945; c. 15 – 19 May 1945
- Victories: 1 warship total loss (1,060 tons)

German submarine U-992 was a Type VIIC U-boat built for Nazi Germany's Kriegsmarine for service during World War II. She was laid down on 30 October 1942 by Blohm & Voss, Hamburg as yard number 192, launched on 24 June 1943 and commissioned on 2 August 1943 under Oberleutnant zur See Hans Falke.

== Design ==
German Type VIIC submarines were preceded by the shorter Type VIIB submarines. U-992 had a displacement of 769 tonnes (757 long tons) when at the surface and 871 tonnes (857 long tons) while submerged. She had a total length of 67.10 m (220 ft 2 in), a pressure hull length of 50.50 m (165 ft 8 in), a beam of 6.20 m (20 ft 4 in), a height of 9.60 m (31 ft 6 in), and a draught of 4.74 m (15 ft 7 in). The submarine was powered by two Germaniawerft F46 four-stroke, six-cylinder supercharged diesel engines producing a total of 2,800 to 3,200 metric horsepower (2,060 to 2,350 kW; 2,760 to 3,160 shp) for use while surfaced, two Brown, Boveri & Cie GG UB 720/8 double-acting electric motors producing a total of 750 metric horsepower (550 kW; 740 shp) for use while submerged. She had two shafts and two 1.23 m (4 ft) propellers. The boat was capable of operating at depths of up to 230 metres (750 ft).

The submarine had a maximum surface speed of 17.7 knots (32.8 km/h; 20.4 mph) and a maximum submerged speed of 7.6 knots (14.1 km/h; 8.7 mph). When submerged, the boat could operate for 80 nautical miles (150 km; 92 mi) at 4 knots (7.4 km/h; 4.6 mph); when surfaced, she could travel 8,500 nautical miles (15,700 km; 9,800 mi) at 10 knots (19 km/h; 12 mph). U-992 was fitted with five 53.3 cm (21 in) torpedo tubes (four fitted at the bow and one at the stern), fourteen torpedoes, one 8.8 cm (3.46 in) SK C/35 naval gun, 220 rounds, and one twin 2 cm (0.79 in) C/30 anti-aircraft gun. The boat had a complement of between forty-four and sixty.

== Service history ==
The boat's career began with training at 5th Flotilla on 2 August 1943, followed by active service on 1 March 1944 as part of the 3rd Flotilla. She later transferred to 11th Flotilla on 1 June 1944, then on to 13th Flotilla on 1 October 1944.

=== Wolfpacks ===
U-992 took part in seven wolfpacks, namely:

- Trutz (1 June – 10 July 1944)
- Dachs (1 – 5 September 1944)
- Zorn (28 September – 1 October 1944)
- Grimm (1 – 2 October 1944)
- Panther (20 October – 9 November 1944)
- Stier (5 – 7 December 1944)
- Hagen (17 – 21 March 1945)

=== Fate ===
U-992 surrendered on 9 May 1945 in Narvik. She was initially transferred to Loch Eriboll, Scotland on 19 May 1945, and sunk on 16 December 1945 at 56°10′N 10°05′W as part of Operation Deadlight.

== Summary of raiding history ==
Date	Ship Name	Nationality	Tonnage (Note: Merchant ship tonnages are in gross register tons. Military vessels are listed by tons displacement.)	Fate
13 February 1945	HMS Denbigh Castle	Royal Navy	1,060	Total loss

== Bibliography ==
- Busch, Rainer; Röll, Hans-Joachim (1999). German U-boat commanders of World War II : a biographical dictionary. Translated by Brooks, Geoffrey. London, Annapolis, Md: Greenhill Books, Naval Institute Press. ISBN 1-55750-186-6.
- Gröner, Erich; Jung, Dieter; Maass, Martin (1991). U-boats and Mine Warfare Vessels. German Warships 1815–1945. Vol. 2. Translated by Thomas, Keith; Magowan, Rachel. London: Conway Maritime Press. ISBN 0-85177-593-4.
- Sharpe, Peter (1998). U-Boat Fact File. Great Britain: Midland Publishing. ISBN 1-85780-072-9.
