= HMS Bamborough Castle =

British warship (1944-1959)

- Bamborough Castle

History

United Kingdom
- Name: Bamborough Castle
- Namesake: Bamborough Castle
- Ordered: 19 December 1942
- Builder: John Lewis & Sons, Aberdeen
- Laid down: 1 July 1943
- Launched: 11 January 1944
- Completed: 30 May 1944
- Identification: Pennant number: K412
- Fate: Scrapped, May 1959

General characteristics
- Class & type: Castle-class corvette
- Displacement: 1,010 long tons (1,030 t) (standard); 1,510 long tons (1,530 t) (deep load)
- Length: 252 ft (76.8 m)
- Beam: 33 ft (10.1 m)
- Draught: 14 ft (4.3 m)
- Installed power: 2 Admiralty 3-drum boilers; 2,880 ihp (2,150 kW)
- Propulsion: 2 shafts, 2 geared steam turbines
- Speed: 16.5 knots (30.6 km/h; 19.0 mph)
- Range: 6,500 nmi (12,000 km; 7,500 mi) at 15 knots (28 km/h; 17 mph)
- Complement: 99
- Sensors & processing systems: Type 145 and Type 147 ASDIC; Type 277 search radar; HF/DF radio direction finder
- Armament: 1 × single 4 in (102 mm) gun; 2 × twin, 2 × single 20 mm (0.8 in) AA guns; 1 × 3-barrel Squid anti-submarine mortar; 15 × depth charges, 1 rack and 2 throwers

HMS Bamborough Castle (K412) was one of 44 Castle-class corvettes built for the Royal Navy during World War II. Completed in mid-1944 she sank the U-boat U-387 on 9 December. Aside from a brief period assigned to the Fishery Protection Squadron in 1946, the rest of her career was spent as part of the fleet reserve until she was scrapped in May 1959.

== Design and description ==
The Castle-class corvette was a stretched version of the preceding Flower class, enlarged to improve seakeeping and to accommodate modern weapons. The ships displaced 1,010 long tons (1,030 t) at standard load and 1,510 long tons (1,530 t) at deep load. They had an overall length of 252 feet (76.8 m), a beam of 36 feet 9 inches (11.2 m) and a deep draught of 14 feet (4.3 m). They were powered by a pair of triple-expansion steam engines, each driving one propeller shaft using steam provided by two Admiralty three-drum boilers. The engines developed a total of 2,880 indicated horsepower (2,150 kW) and gave a maximum speed of 16.5 knots (30.6 km/h; 19.0 mph). The Castles carried enough fuel oil to give them a range of 6,500 nautical miles (12,000 km; 7,500 mi) at 15 knots (28 km/h; 17 mph). The ships' complement was 99 officers and ratings.

The Castle-class ships were equipped with a single QF 4-inch (102 mm) Mk XVI gun forward, but their primary weapon was their single three-barrel Squid anti-submarine mortar. This was backed up by one depth charge rail and two throwers for 15 depth charges. The ships were fitted with two twin and a pair of single mounts for 20-millimetre (0.8 in) Oerlikon light AA guns. Provision was made for a further four single mounts if needed. They were equipped with Type 145Q and Type 147B ASDIC sets to detect submarines by reflections from sound waves beamed into the water. A Type 277 search radar and a HF/DF radio direction finder rounded out the Castles' sensor suite.

== Construction and career ==
Bamborough Castle was laid down by J. Lewis & Sons at their shipyard in Aberdeen on 1 July 1943 and launched on 11 January 1944. She was completed on 30 May and served as a convoy escort, sinking the German U-boat U-387 in the Barents Sea with depth charges on 9 December 1944. The ship was placed in reserve on 25 May 1945. Bamborough Castle was reactivated in January 1946 and assigned to the Fishery Protection Flotilla based at Plymouth before she returned to reserve in 1947. The ship was sold for scrap in 1959 and arrived at Llanelli on 22 May to be broken up.

== Bibliography ==
- Chesneau, Roger, ed. (1980). Conway's All the World's Fighting Ships 1922–1946. Greenwich, UK: Conway Maritime Press. ISBN 0-85177-146-7.
- Colledge, J. J.; Warlow, Ben (2006) [1969]. Ships of the Royal Navy: The Complete Record of All Fighting Ships of the Royal Navy from the 15th Century to the Present (3rd Rev ed.). London: Chatham Publishing. ISBN 978-1-86176-281-8. OCLC 67375475.
- Goodwin, Norman (2007). Castle Class Corvettes: An Account of the Service of the Ships and of Their Ships' Companies. Liskeard, UK: Maritime Books. ISBN 978-1-904459-27-9.
- Lenton, H. T. (1998). British & Empire Warships of the Second World War. Annapolis, Maryland: Naval Institute Press. ISBN 1-55750-048-7.
- Rohwer, Jürgen (2005). Chronology of the War at Sea 1939–1945: The Naval History of World War Two (Third Revised ed.). Annapolis, Maryland: Naval Institute Press. ISBN 1-59114-119-2.
