= German submarine U-387 =

German world war II submarine

Coordinates: 69°41′N 33°12′E

History

Nazi Germany
- Name: U-387
- Ordered: 21 November 1940
- Builder: Howaldtswerke, Kiel
- Yard number: 18
- Laid down: 5 September 1941
- Launched: 1 October 1942
- Commissioned: 24 November 1942
- Fate: Sunk on 9 December 1944

General characteristics
- Class & type: Type VIIC submarine
- Displacement: 769 tonnes (757 long tons) surfaced; 871 t (857 long tons) submerged
- Length: 67.10 m (220 ft 2 in) o/a; 50.50 m (165 ft 8 in) pressure hull
- Beam: 6.20 m (20 ft 4 in) o/a; 4.70 m (15 ft 5 in) pressure hull
- Height: 9.60 m (31 ft 6 in)
- Draught: 4.74 m (15 ft 7 in)
- Installed power: 2,800–3,200 PS (2,100–2,400 kW; 2,800–3,200 bhp) (diesels); 750 PS (550 kW; 740 shp) (electric)
- Propulsion: 2 shafts; 2 × diesel engines; 2 × electric motors.
- Speed: 17.7 knots (32.8 km/h; 20.4 mph) surfaced; 7.6 knots (14.1 km/h; 8.7 mph) submerged
- Range: 8,500 nmi (15,700 km; 9,800 mi) at 10 knots (19 km/h; 12 mph) surfaced; 80 nmi (150 km; 92 mi) at 4 knots (7.4 km/h; 4.6 mph) submerged
- Test depth: 230 m (750 ft); Crush depth: 250–295 m (820–968 ft)
- Complement: 4 officers, 40–56 enlisted
- Armament: 5 × 53.3 cm (21 in) torpedo tubes (four bow, one stern); 14 × torpedoes; 1 × 8.8 cm (3.46 in) deck gun (220 rounds); 2 × twin 2 cm (0.79 in) C/30 anti-aircraft guns

Service record
- Part of: 5th U-boat Flotilla; 24 November 1942 – 30 June 1943; 7th U-boat Flotilla; 1 July – 31 October 1943; 13th U-boat Flotilla; 1 November – 9 December 1943
- Identification codes: M 51 018
- Commanders: Kptlt. Rudolf Büchler; 24 November 1942 – 9 December 1944
- Operations: 10 patrols: 1st patrol: 3 July – 21 August 1943; 2nd patrol: a. 18 September – 4 October 1943; b. 4 – 6 October 1943; 3rd patrol: a. 22 October – 6 December 1943; b. 7 December 1943 – 5 January 1944; c. 7 – 9 January 1944; d. 12 – 16 January 1944; e. 13 – 18 April 1944; 4th patrol: 20 April – 5 May 1944; 5th patrol: 20 May – 8 June 1944; 6th patrol: 23 – 24 June 1944; 7th patrol: a. 11 – 21 July 1944; b. 25 – 27 July 1944; 8th patrol: 28 September – 3 October 1944; 9th patrol: 9 October – 10 November 1944; 10th patrol: 21 November – 9 December 1944
- Victories: None

The German submarine U-387 was a Type VIIC U-boat of Nazi Germany's Kriegsmarine during World War II. She carried out ten patrols. She sank no ships. She was a member of eleven wolfpacks. She was sunk by HMS Bamborough Castle in the Barents Sea on 9 December 1944.

== Design ==
German Type VIIC submarines were preceded by the shorter Type VIIB submarines. U-387 had a displacement of 769 tonnes (757 long tons) when at the surface and 871 tonnes (857 long tons) while submerged. She had a total length of 67.10 m (220 ft 2 in), a pressure hull length of 50.50 m (165 ft 8 in), a beam of 6.20 m (20 ft 4 in), a height of 9.60 m (31 ft 6 in), and a draught of 4.74 m (15 ft 7 in). The submarine was powered by two Germaniawerft F46 four-stroke, six-cylinder supercharged diesel engines producing a total of 2,800 to 3,200 metric horsepower (2,060 to 2,350 kW; 2,760 to 3,160 shp) for use while surfaced, two Garbe, Lahmeyer & Co. RP 137/c double-acting electric motors producing a total of 750 metric horsepower (550 kW; 740 shp) for use while submerged. She had two shafts and two 1.23 m (4 ft) propellers. The boat was capable of operating at depths of up to 230 metres (750 ft).

The submarine had a maximum surface speed of 17.7 knots (32.8 km/h; 20.4 mph) and a maximum submerged speed of 7.6 knots (14.1 km/h; 8.7 mph). When submerged, the boat could operate for 80 nautical miles (150 km; 92 mi) at 4 knots (7.4 km/h; 4.6 mph); when surfaced, she could travel 8,500 nautical miles (15,700 km; 9,800 mi) at 10 knots (19 km/h; 12 mph). U-387 was fitted with five 53.3 cm (21 in) torpedo tubes (four fitted at the bow and one at the stern), fourteen torpedoes, one 8.8 cm (3.46 in) SK C/35 naval gun, 220 rounds, and two twin 2 cm (0.79 in) C/30 anti-aircraft guns. The boat had a complement of between forty-four and sixty.

== Service history ==
The submarine was laid down on 5 September 1941 at the Howaldtswerke yard at Kiel as yard number 18, launched on 1 October 1942 and commissioned on 24 November under the command of Kapitänleutnant Rudolf Büchler.

She served with the 5th U-boat Flotilla from 24 November 1942 and the 7th flotilla from 1 July 1943. She was reassigned to the 13th flotilla from 1 November until her loss.

=== First patrol ===
U-387's first patrol was preceded by short trips from Kiel to Marviken, then to Bergen in June 1943. The boat's patrol proper commenced with her departure from Bergen on 3 July. She followed the Norwegian coast as far as Bodø and then headed due north as far as a point a few miles short of Svalbard. She then sailed south, passing to the west of Bear Island, docking in Narvik on 21 August. At 50 days, it was her longest patrol, but sighting the enemy did not happen.

=== Second and third patrols ===
The boat's second and third sorties were both divided into two parts. Her crew got to know the northern Norwegian, Greenland and Barents Seas particularly well.

=== Fourth, fifth and sixth patrols ===
The monotony of her fourth, fifth and sixth forays was not relieved by success.

=== Seventh patrol ===
By now based in Narvik, the submarine was carrying out her seventh patrol when she was attacked by a Norwegian-crewed Sunderland flying boat of No. 330 Squadron RAF. Enough damage was inflicted to oblige the U-boat to put into Trondheim for repairs.

=== Eight and ninth patrols ===
U-387's eighth patrol was uneventful as was her ninth, which took her to the waters around the North Cape.

=== Tenth patrol and loss ===
The boat left Narvik for the last time on 24 November 1944. On 9 December, she was sunk in the Barents Sea near Murmansk by depth charges dropped by the British corvette HMS Bamborough Castle.

Fifty-one men died in the U-boat; there were no survivors.

=== Wolfpacks ===
U-387 took part in eleven wolfpacks, namely:

- Monsun (4 – 5 October 1943)
- Eisenbart (23 October – 5 December 1943)
- Eisenbart (7 December 1943 – 3 January 1944)
- Donner & Keil (21 April – 3 May 1944)
- Trutz (23 – 31 May 1944)
- Grimm (31 May – 6 June 1944)
- Feuer (17 September 1944)
- Zorn (29 September – 1 October 1944)
- Grimm (1 – 2 October 1944)
- Panther (17 October – 7 November 1944)
- Stier (25 November – 9 December 1944)

== Bibliography ==
- Busch, Rainer; Röll, Hans-Joachim (1999). German U-boat commanders of World War II : a biographical dictionary. Translated by Brooks, Geoffrey. London, Annapolis, Md: Greenhill Books, Naval Institute Press. ISBN 1-55750-186-6.
- Busch, Rainer; Röll, Hans-Joachim (1999). Deutsche U-Boot-Verluste von September 1939 bis Mai 1945 [German U-boat losses from September 1939 to May 1945]. Der U-Boot-Krieg (in German). Vol. IV. Hamburg, Berlin, Bonn: Mittler. ISBN 3-8132-0514-2.
- Gröner, Erich; Jung, Dieter; Maass, Martin (1991). U-boats and Mine Warfare Vessels. German Warships 1815–1945. Vol. 2. Translated by Thomas, Keith; Magowan, Rachel. London: Conway Maritime Press. ISBN 0-85177-593-4.
- Kemp, Paul (1999). U-Boats Destroyed – German Submarine Losses in the World Wars. London: Arms & Armour. ISBN 1-85409-515-3.
