= German submarine U-88 =

U-88 may refer to one of the following German submarines:

- SM U-88, a Type U 87 submarine launched in 1916 and that served in the First World War until sunk on 5 September 1917
  - During the First World War, Germany also had this submarine with a similar name:
    - SM UB-88, a Type UB III submarine launched in 1917 and surrendered on 26 November 1918; used as an exhibition in the United States; scuttled at San Pedro, California on 3 January 1921 after being used as gunnery target by USS Wilkes (DD-67)
- German submarine U-88 (1941), a Type VIIC submarine that served in the Second World War until sunk on 12 September 1942

U-88 was captained by Kptlt. Walter Schweiger, who had previously gained international notoriety, when, on 7 May, 1915, as captain of the German submarine, U-20, he fired the torpedo which sunk the British passenger ship RMS Lusitania
