= SS Richard Bland =

Liberty ship of WWII

History

United States
- Name: Richard Bland
- Namesake: Richard Bland
- Owner: War Shipping Administration (WSA)
- Operator: American South African Lines, Inc.
- Ordered: as type (EC2-S-C1) hull, MCE hull 28
- Awarded: 14 March 1941
- Builder: Bethlehem-Fairfield Shipyard, Baltimore, Maryland
- Cost: $1,204,048
- Yard number: 2015
- Way number: 2
- Laid down: 29 October 1941
- Launched: 28 February 1942
- Completed: 17 April 1942
- Identification: Call sign: KENZ
- Fate: Sunk, 10 March 1943

General characteristics
- Class & type: Liberty ship; type EC2-S-C1, standard
- Tonnage: 10,865 LT DWT; 7,176 GRT
- Displacement: 3,380 long tons (3,434 t) (light); 14,245 long tons (14,474 t) (max)
- Length: 441 feet 6 inches (135 m) oa; 416 feet (127 m) pp; 427 feet (130 m) lwl
- Beam: 57 feet (17 m)
- Draft: 27 ft 9.25 in (8.4646 m)
- Installed power: 2 × Oil fired 450 °F (232 °C) boilers, operating at 220 psi (1,500 kPa); 2,500 hp (1,900 kW)
- Propulsion: 1 × triple-expansion steam engine, (manufactured by Worthington Pump & Machinery Corp, Harrison, New Jersey); 1 × screw propeller
- Speed: 11.5 knots (21.3 km/h; 13.2 mph)
- Capacity: 562,608 cubic feet (15,931 m^{3}) (grain); 499,573 cubic feet (14,146 m^{3}) (bale)
- Complement: 38–62 USMM; 21–40 USNAG
- Armament: Varied by ship; Bow-mounted 3-inch (76 mm)/50-caliber gun; Stern-mounted 4-inch (102 mm)/50-caliber gun; 2–8 × single 20-millimeter (0.79 in) Oerlikon anti-aircraft (AA) cannons and/or, 2–8 × 37-millimeter (1.46 in) M1 AA guns

SS Richard Bland was a Liberty ship built in the United States during World War II. She was named after Richard Bland, an American planter and statesman from Virginia. He served for many terms in the House of Burgesses, was a delegate to the Continental Congress in 1774 and 1775, and is considered a Founding Father of the United States.

== Construction ==
Richard Bland was laid down on 29 October 1941, under a Maritime Commission (MARCOM) contract, MCE hull 28, by the Bethlehem-Fairfield Shipyard, Baltimore, Maryland; and was launched on 28 February 1942.

== History ==
She was allocated to American South African Lines, Inc., on 17 April 1942.

=== Sinking ===
Richard Bland had set out from Murmansk, on 1 March 1943, for Loch Ewe, with 4,000 LT (4,100 t) of lumber, in Convoy RA 53. At 09:26, on the morning of 5 March 1943, Richard Bland was struck by a torpedo from a spread of three fired from the German submarine U-255, at 72°44′N 11°27′E. The merchant ship SS Executive was sunk while one of the torpedo struck Richard Bland on the starboard side at hold #1, passing through without exploding. This created two eight ft (2.4 m) holes on either side of the ship causing the deck to crack and the collision bulkhead to rupture. The forepeak tank flooded and the ship to begin to list to starboard, but she remained in the convoy at only a slightly reduced speed. On the night of 6 March, she was forced from the convoy because of gale-force winds and rough seas. She then proceeded by herself to Iceland. At 16:36, on 10 March, U-255 fired a spread of three torpedoes at Richard Bland with only one sticking her on her port side at the fireroom. This caused the #4 and #5 holds to flood and the ship soon broke in two just forward of the bridge. The captain, Lawrence Dodd, ordered four crewmen into each of two lifeboats to be launched, but they were not released, until the abandon ship order was given. When attempting to pass the boats to the other side of Richard Bland the ropes broke and they drifted astern. U-255 fired another spread at 16:56, but missed. At 21:07, U-255 struck the stern section at 66°53′N 14°10′W which sank at 22:03. The rest of the crew of nine officers, 32 crewmen and 28 Armed guards were forced to abandon ship in the two remaining lifeboats. Due to the boats being overcrowded and rough seas, men that had to cling to the sides of the boats lost strength and drowned, while the boat that the captain was on was believed to have been swamped and not seen again.

HMS Impulsive (D11) was able to pick up 27 survivors in the remaining lifeboat on 11 March, with the two lifeboats, containing 4 crewmen each, being picked up later in the morning. The captain, along with five officers, 13 crewmen, and 15 Armed guards were lost. The forward section was later taken in tow and brought to Akureyri, Iceland, where she was declared a Constructive Total Loss.

== Bibliography ==
- "Bethlehem-Fairfield, Baltimore MD". www.ShipbuildingHistory.com. 14 August 2008.
- Maritime Administration. "Richard Bland". Ship History Database Vessel Status Card. U.S. Department of Transportation, Maritime Administration.
- Davies, James (May 2004). "Specifications (As-Built)" (PDF). p. 23.
- "SS Richard Bland".
- "Richard Bland".
