= SS Pan Kraft =

Cargo ship

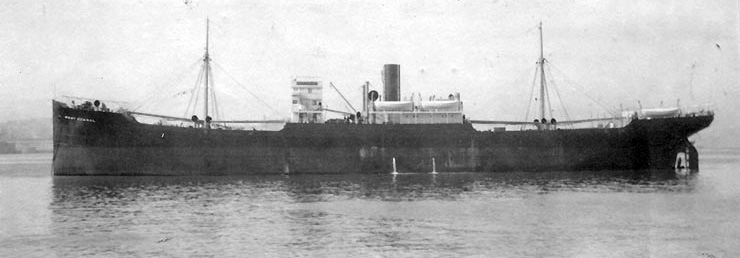
- West Avenal, sister ship to Pan Kraft

History
- Name: Pan Kraft
- Operator: Waterman Steamship Company
- Builder: Western Pipe & Steel
- Yard number: WPS Hull No. 11
- Launched: July 2, 1919
- Christened: West Kader
- Acquired: December 31, 1919
- Home port: Wilmington, Delaware
- Fate: Sunk by bombing, July 7, 1942

General characteristics
- Tonnage: 5,570 GRT; 3,468 NRT; 8,800 DWT
- Length: 410 ft 6 in (125.12 m)
- Beam: 54 ft 0 in (16.46 m)
- Draft: 24 ft 1 1/2 in (7.353 m)
- Propulsion: Joshua Hendy 3-cylinder triple expansion, 2,800 ihp (2,100 kW)
- Speed: 11 knots (20 km/h)
- Crew: 44

Pan Kraft was a cargo ship built in 1919 by the Western Pipe and Steel Company of California. She was one of eighteen ships built by the company for the U.S. Shipping Board. After merchant service between the wars, she was to become one of the victims of Great Britain's disastrous Convoy PQ 17 to Russia during World War II.

== Operational history ==
Pan Kraft was launched as West Kader on July 2, 1919, and delivered to the Shipping Board on December 31, 1919. She made her maiden voyage between Portland, Oregon, and the Far East on January 8, 1920, and in August 1920 made a trip to Cork, Ireland. From April 1920 to April 1928, West Kader continued to operate from Portland, Oregon, to China, Japan, Russia, the Philippines, and Hong Kong.

On June 4, 1928, West Kader was sold by the U.S. Shipping Board to the States Steamship Company of Portland, Oregon, who renamed her New York. On September 10, 1936, the U.S.-flag cargo liner Romance collided with New York at Boston, Massachusetts, and sank without loss of life.

New York's home port remained Portland until 1937 when she was sold to the Everett Steamship Company of Mobile, Alabama, who renamed her Pan Kraft and home-ported her in Mobile.

Pan Kraft was acquired by Pan Atlantic Steamship Corporation in 1939. Her home port remained Mobile, but after Waterman Steamship Company became manager of the vessel, her home port was changed to Wilmington, Delaware.

=== Convoy PQ 17 ===
Following the outbreak of World War II and the entry of the United States into the war, Pan Kraft was assigned a delivery of military equipment to the Soviet Union under the US-Soviet lend-lease agreement. With a deck full of planes and cargo holds full of crated aircraft, Pan Kraft made the first leg of her journey from New York City to Hvalfjordur, Iceland, where she joined with other merchant vessels and a Royal Navy escort to form Convoy PQ 17. The convoy departed for the Soviet port of Arkhangelsk on June 24, 1942.

On July 4, the commander of PQ 17's naval escort was informed that the German battleship Tirpitz was on course to intercept. He made the fateful decision to scatter the convoy, with disastrous results. German U-boats and aircraft were able to pick off the isolated ships with ease, sinking 25 of the convoy's 36 merchant vessels and putting PQ 17 into the record books as the greatest Russia-bound convoy loss of the war.

Pan Kraft was not to be one of the fortunate few to escape. On July 5 she was attacked in the Barents Sea by Junkers Ju 88 bombers, and though she did not suffer a direct hit, her oil and steam lines were ruptured and she had to be abandoned. The British corvette HMS Lotus then attempted without success to sink the disabled vessel, but at 6:00 am on July 7, 1942, Pan Kraft finally sank after suffering an internal explosion.

Two more of the convoy's ships were sunk on the return journey.
