= SS Hoosier =

Design 1022 cargo ship

History

United States
- Name: Carlecay (1920); Tomalva (1920–1932)
- Owner: United States Shipping Board (USSB)
- Builder: American International Shipbuilding Corp., Hog Island, Philadelphia, Pennsylvania
- Yard number: 1532
- In service: 13 September 1920
- Identification: Official number: 220628; Call sign: MBLV
- Fate: Sold, 1932

United States
- Name: Black Eagle
- Owner: Black Diamond Lines, Inc.
- Fate: Sold, 1941

United States
- Name: Hoosier
- Namesake: Hoosier
- Owner: Hoosier Marine Corp.
- Operator: War Shipping Administration (WSA)
- Fate: Sold, 20 December 1941

United States
- Name: Hoosier
- Owner: War Shipping Administration (WSA)
- Operator: States Marine Corp.
- Identification: Call sign: KDFH
- Fate: Sunk 10 July 1942

General characteristics
- Type: Design 1022 cargo ship
- Tonnage: 5,036 GRT (1920-1934); 5,060 GRT (1933-1942); 3,101 NRT (1920-1934); 3,123 NRT (1933-1942)
- Length: 390 ft (120 m)
- Beam: 54 ft 2 in (16.51 m)
- Draft: 24 ft 4 in (7.42 m)
- Installed power: 3 × Babcock & Wilcox water tube boilers; 2,500 shp (1,900 kW)
- Propulsion: 1 × Geared steam turbine; 1 × screw propeller
- Speed: 10.9 knots (20.2 km/h; 12.5 mph)

Hoosier was a 5,060-gross register ton (GRT) Design 1022 cargo ship that was built in 1920, by American International Shipbuilding, Hog Island, Philadelphia, Pennsylvania, for the United States Shipping Board (USSB).

== Construction ==
Laid down as Carlecay, she was completed as Tomalva. The ship was a Design 1022 cargo ship built in 1920, by American International Shipbuilding, Hog Island, Philadelphia, Pennsylvania. She was yard number 1532.

The ship was 390 ft (120 m) long, with a beam of 54 ft 2 in (16.51 m). She had a depth of 27 ft 8 in (8.43 m). She was assessed at 5,036 grt (14,260 m^{3}).

The ship was propelled by a double reduction geared steam turbine, driving a single screw propeller. The turbine was made by General Electric Co., Inc., Schenectady, New York.

== Ship history ==
Tomalva was put into service on 13 September 1920. In 1932, she was sold to Black Diamond Lines, Inc., and renamed Black Eagle. He tonnage was increased to 5,060 GRT.

In 1941, Black Eagle was sold to Hoosier Marine Corp., and renamed Hoosier.

On 20 December 1941, Hoosier was purchased by the War Shipping Administration (WSA).

On 27 June 1942, Hoosier departed Hvalfjordur, Iceland, en route to Reykjavík and then Arkhangelsk, with convoy PQ-17. She was carrying 5,029 t (4,950 long tons; 5,544 short tons) of machinery and explosives, along with tanks on her deck.

=== Sinking ===
On 4 July 1942, while part of convoy PQ-17, she was ordered by the Admiralty to disperse while in the Barents Sea, due to the threat of the German battleship Tirpitz, sailing from Norway. Upon reaching Novaya Zemlya, she met up with five other merchant ships and eight escorts from the convoy, in the Matochkin Strait. Commodore John Dowding, the commander of convoy PQ-17, was able to assemble a small convoy and proceeded to sail for Murmansk and Archangel, on 7 July.

The small convoy was attacked at 21:45, by Junkers Ju 88 aircraft from Kampfgeschwader 2 and 3, on July 9, 65 mi (105 km) north of Iokanka. The first run on Hoosier missed, but the second run landed 5 ft (1.5 m) from the boat deck, and the third run landed 60 ft (18 m) away. The explosions caused damage to steam pipes and oil lines, along with springing some hull plates and disabling the engines. With the ship disabled and taking on water, the order was given to abandon ship. At 00:30, Hoosier, which had sailed with eight officers, one radioman, and thirty-three Merchant Marines, along with her Armed Guard of one officer and ten sailors, climbed into the four lifeboats that she carried. HMS Poppy picked up the crew after 30 minutes, with no loss of life or injuries.

The commander of HMS La Malouine attempted to tow Hoosier to port by embarking a salvage crew, which included Hoosier's engineers. U-255 was spotted four mi (6.4 km) astern of the corvette, so it was decided to release the tow line and disembark the salvage crew. Poppy then attempted to sink Hoosier with gunfire, but was unsuccessful.

U-376 hit Hoosier with a torpedo at 02:56, on 10 July, but failed to sink the burning and drifting wreck. At 03:02, she again fired a torpedo, but this one missed. At 03:07, U-376 hit the engine room with a final torpedo and Hoosier sank by the bow.

Wreck location: 69°45′N 39°35′E

== Bibliography ==
- "EFC Design 1022 (Standard Fabricated Hog Island Type A): Notes & Illustrations".
- Mitchell, W.H.; Sawyer, L.A. (1995). The Empire Ships. London, New York, Hamburg, Hong Kong: Lloyd's of London Press Ltd. p. not cited. ISBN 1-85044-275-4.
- "American International Shipbuilding (AISC) Hog Island Shipyard, Philadelphia, PA". Shipbuilding History. 24 August 2021.
- "Lloyd's Register of Shipping 1923 Steamers". Lloyd's. 1923.
- Helgason, Guðmundur. "Hoosier".
- "Lloyd's Register of Shipping 1933 Steamers". Lloyd's. 1933.
- "Lloyd's Register of Shipping 1942 Steamers". Lloyd's. 1942.
- Maritime Administration. "Hoosier". Ship History Database Vessel Status Card. U.S. Department of Transportation, Maritime Administration.
