= HMS Poppy (K213) =

Flower-class corvette

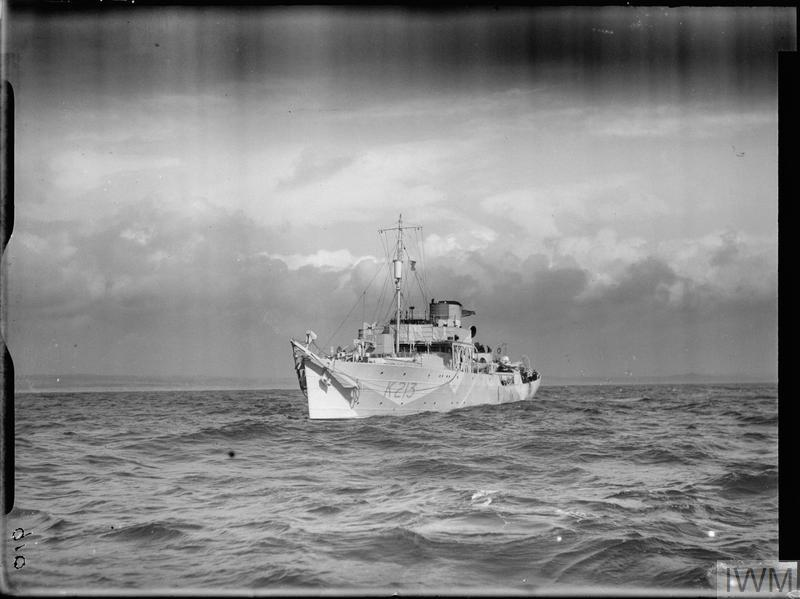
- HMS Poppy underway

History

United Kingdom
- Name: Poppy
- Namesake: Poppy
- Ordered: 3 August 1940
- Builder: Alexander Hall & Co., Ltd., Aberdeen, Scotland
- Laid down: 6 March 1941
- Launched: 20 November 1941
- Commissioned: 12 May 1942
- Decommissioned: June 1945
- Identification: Pennant number: K213
- Fate: Sold as merchant ship 1946. Scrapped 1956.

General characteristics
- Class & type: Flower-class corvette
- Displacement: 925 long tons (940 t)
- Length: 205 ft (62 m) o/a
- Beam: 33 ft (10 m)
- Draught: 11 ft 6 in (3.51 m)
- Installed power: 2 × water tube boilers; 2,750 ihp (2,050 kW)
- Propulsion: 1 × double acting triple-expansion reciprocating steam engine; 1 × shaft
- Speed: 16 knots (30 km/h; 18 mph)
- Range: 3,500 nmi (6,500 km; 4,000 mi) at 12 kn (22 km/h; 14 mph)
- Complement: 85
- Sensors & processing systems: 1 × SW1C or 2C radar; 1 × Type 123A or Type 127DV sonar
- Armament: 1 × BL 4 in (102 mm) Mk.IX gun; 2 × Vickers .50 mm (0 in) cal machine gun (twin); 2 × Lewis .303 mm (0 in) cal machine gun (twin); 2 × Mk.II Depth charge throwers; 2 × Depth charge rails with 40 depth charges

HMS Poppy was a Flower-class corvette that served in the Royal Navy as a convoy escort during World War II.

== Design and construction ==
The Flower class arose as a result of the Royal Navy's realisation in the late 1930s that it had a shortage of escort vessels, particularly coastal escorts for use on the East coast of Britain, as the likelihood of war with Germany increased. To meet this urgent requirement, a design developed based on the whale-catcher Southern Pride - this design was much more capable than naval trawlers, but cheaper and quicker to build than the Hunt-class destroyers or Kingfisher-class sloops that were alternatives for the coastal escort role.

The early Flowers, such as Aubrietia were 205 feet 0 inches (62.48 m) long overall, 196 feet 0 inches (59.74 m) at the waterline and 190 feet 0 inches (57.91 m) between perpendiculars. Beam was 33 feet 0 inches (10.06 m) and draught was 14 feet 10 inches (4.52 m) aft. Displacement was about 940 long tons (960 t) standard and 1,170 long tons (1,190 t) full load. Two Admiralty three-drum water tube boilers fed steam to a vertical triple-expansion engine rated at 2,750 indicated horsepower (2,050 kW) which drove a single propeller shaft. This gave a speed of 16 knots (30 km/h; 18 mph). 200 tons of oil were carried, giving a range of 4,000 nautical miles (7,400 km; 4,600 mi) at 12 knots (22 km/h; 14 mph).

Poppy was one of six Flowers ordered on 3 August 1940. The ship was laid down on 6 March 1941, by Alexander Hall & Co., Ltd., at their Aberdeen, Scotland shipyard. She was launched on 20 November 1941, and commissioned on 12 May 1942.

== Service history ==
On 27 June 1942, Poppy departed Reykjavík, Iceland, escorting convoy PQ-17, bound for Arkhangelsk, Russia. On 4 July 1942, the Admiralty ordered the convoy to disperse. Poppy rescued 53 survivors from the United States cargo ship SS Hoosier, at 69°45′N 39°35′E. Efforts were made by the captain of HMS La Malouine to repair Hoosier and take her under tow, but when the German submarine U-255 was spotted 4 nmi (7.4 km; 4.6 mi) astern she was again abandoned and Poppy tried to sink Hoosier with gun fire, but was unsuccessful.

Poppy escorted 51 convoys during the war, along with anti-submarine exercises with Royal Navy submarines off of Lough Foyle, and once each off Derry and Campbeltown.

== Sources ==
- Elliott, Peter (1977). Allied Escort Ships of World War II: A complete survey. London: Macdonald and Jane's Publishers. ISBN 0-356-08401-9.
- Friedman, Norman (2008). British Destroyers and Frigates: The Second World War and After. Barnsley, UK: Seaforth Publishing. ISBN 978-1-84832-015-4.
- Lambert, John; Brown, Les (2008). Flower-Class Corvettes. St. Catharines, Ontario, Canada: Vanwall Publishing. ISBN 978-1-55068-986-0.
- Helgason, Guðmundur. "Allied Warships – HMS Poppy (K213)". www.uboat.net.
- Helgason, Guðmundur. "Ships hit by U-boats – Hoosier". www.uboat.net.
- "Convoy Web". www.convoyweb.org.uk.
