= Belvoir =

Belvoir (French: beautiful view; and counterpart of fairview) may refer to:

== France ==
- Belvoir, Doubs, France, a commune
  - Belvoir castle (Château de Belvoir in French; 12th-17th century) in the commune

== Israel ==
- Belvoir Castle (Israel), a Crusader (Hospitaller) castle in the Jordan Valley
  - Battle of Belvoir Castle, a military campaign involving that castle
- Belveer/Beauverium, a Crusader castle near Jerusalem: see Al-Qastal, Jerusalem

== United Kingdom ==
- Belvoir Park Golf Club, Belfast, Northern Ireland
- Belvoir F.C., a football club in Northern Ireland
- HMS Belvoir, Royal Navy ships
- Vale of Belvoir, England
  - Belvoir, Leicestershire, a village in England
  - Belvoir Castle, Belvoir village
  - Belvoir Priory, near the castle
  - Belvoir Hunt, a fox hunt in the Vale of Belvoir
  - Belvoir High School, in the Vale of Belvoir
  - Belvoir Rural District (1894–1935)
  - Belvoir Farm, soft drinks company

== United States ==
- Belvoir (Saffold Plantation), Alabama
- Belvoir, Kansas, a ghost town
- Belvoir (Crownsville, Maryland), a historic home
- Belvoir Township, Pitt County, North Carolina
  - Belvoir, North Carolina, a community in the township
- Belvoir (RTA Rapid Transit station), Cleveland, Ohio
- Belvoir (plantation), Virginia
  - Fort Belvoir, on the plantation site

== Other places ==
- Belvoir St Theatre, Sydney, Australia
  - Belvoir (theatre company)
- Villa Belvoir and Belvoirpark, Zürich, Switzerland
- Wodonga, a regional city in Victoria, Australia, previously named Belvoir,

== See also ==
- Beauvais (disambiguation)
- Beauvoir (disambiguation)
