= USS S-25 =

S-class submarine of the United States

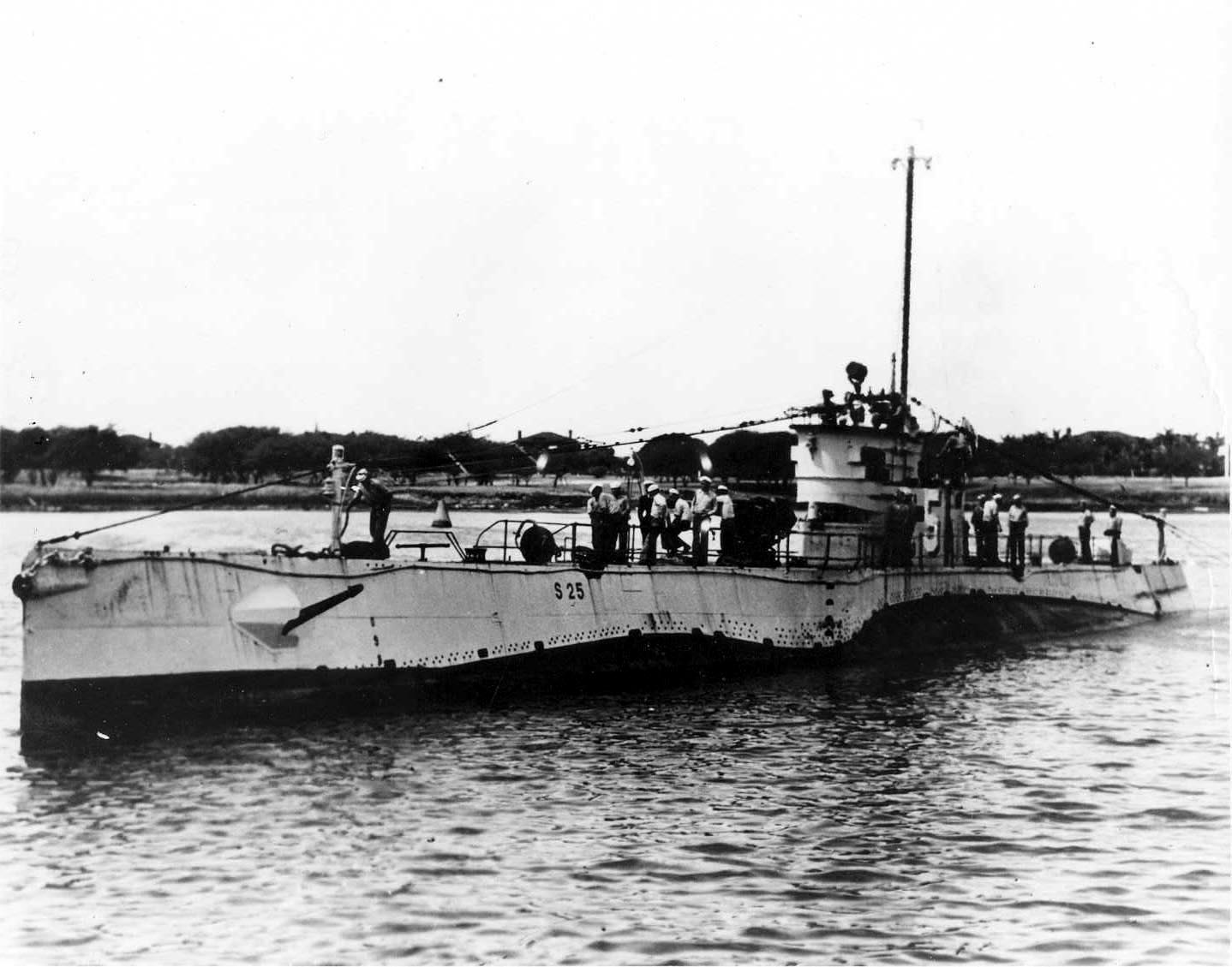
- USS S-25 (SS-130) possibly off New London, Connecticut], c. 1923 or 1924

History

United States
- Name: S-25
- Builder: Fore River Shipyard, Quincy, Massachusetts
- Cost: $677,622.76 (hull and machinery)
- Laid down: 16 October 1918
- Launched: 29 May 1922
- Sponsored by: Mrs. Vera Schlabach
- Commissioned: 9 July 1923
- Decommissioned: 4 November 1941
- Identification: Hull symbol: SS-130; Call sign: NINP
- Fate: Transferred to United Kingdom, 4 November 1941

Royal NavyUnited Kingdom
- Name: P.551
- Acquired: 4 November 1941
- Fate: Loaned to Poland, 4 November 1941
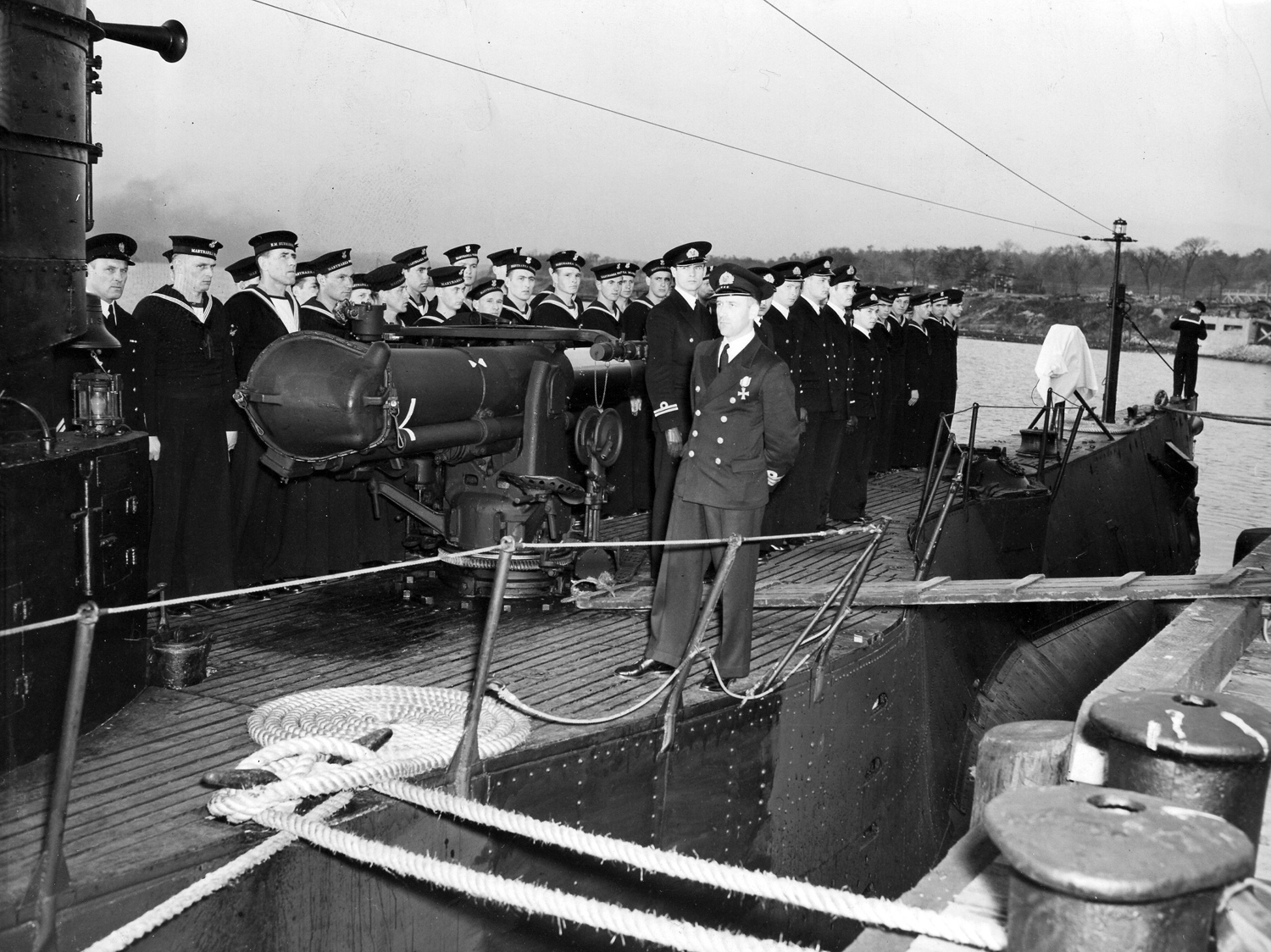
- The ceremony to rename the US S-class submarine as Polish submarine ORP Jastrząb. Lt.Cmdr. Boleslaw Romanowski waits for officials in front of the crew.

Polish NavyPoland
- Name: Jastrząb
- Namesake: Hawk
- Acquired: 4 November 1941
- Commissioned: 4 November 1941
- Fate: Sunk, 2 May 1942

General characteristics
- Class & type: S-18-class submarine
- Displacement: 930 long tons (945 t) surfaced; 1,094 long tons (1,112 t) submerged
- Length: 219 feet 3 inches (66.83 m)
- Beam: 20 ft 8 in (6.30 m)
- Draft: 17 ft 3 in (5.26 m)
- Installed power: 1,200 brake horsepower (895 kW) diesel; 2,375 hp (1,771 kW) electric
- Propulsion: 2 × NELSECO diesel engines; 2 × Ridgway Dynamo & Engine Company electric motors; 2 × 60-cell batteries; 2 × Propellers
- Speed: 14.5 knots (26.9 km/h; 16.7 mph) surfaced; 11 kn (20 km/h; 13 mph) submerged
- Range: 3,420 nmi (6,330 km; 3,940 mi) at 6.5 kn (12.0 km/h; 7.5 mph) surfaced; 8,950 nmi (16,580 km; 10,300 mi) at 9.5 kn (17.6 km/h; 10.9 mph) surfaced with fuel in main ballast tanks; 20 hours at 5 knots (9 km/h; 6 mph) submerged
- Test depth: 200 ft (61 m)
- Capacity: 41,921 US gallons (158,690 L; 34,907 imp gal) fuel oil
- Complement: 4 officers; 34 enlisted
- Armament: 4 × 21-inch (533 mm) torpedo tubes (12 torpedoes); 1 × 4-inch (102 mm)/50-caliber

USS S-25 (SS-130) was an S-18-class submarine, also referred to as an S-1-class or "Holland"-type, of the United States Navy. During World War II, she was transferred to the Royal Navy as P.551, and subsequently transferred to Poland as Jastrząb. She was sunk in a friendly fire incident, on 2 May 1942.

== Design ==
The S-18-class had a length of 219 feet 3 inches (66.8 m) overall, a beam of 20 ft 8 in (6.3 m), and a mean draft of 17 ft 3 in (5.3 m). They displaced 930 long tons (940 t) on the surface and 1,094 long tons (1,112 t) submerged. All S-class submarines had a crew of 4 officers and 34 enlisted men, when first commissioned. They had a diving depth of 200 ft (61.0 m).

For surface running, the S-18-class were powered by two 600-brake-horsepower (447 kW) NELSECO diesel engines, each driving one propeller shaft. When submerged each propeller was driven by a 1,175-horsepower (876 kW) Ridgway Dynamo & Engine Company electric motor. They could reach 14.5 knots (26.9 km/h; 16.7 mph) on the surface and 11 kn (20 km/h; 13 mph) underwater.

The boats were armed with four 21-inch (533 mm) torpedo tubes in the bow. They carried eight reloads, for a total of twelve torpedoes. The S-18-class submarines were also armed with a single 4 in (100 mm)/50 caliber deck gun.

== Construction ==
S-25's keel was laid down on 26 October 1918, by the Bethlehem Shipbuilding Corporation's Fore River Shipyard, in Quincy, Massachusetts. She was launched on 29 May 1922, sponsored by Mrs. Vera Schlabach, and commissioned on 9 July 1923.

== Service history ==
=== US Navy ===
Operating from New London, Connecticut, in 1923, S-25 participated in winter maneuvers in the Caribbean Sea, and the Panama Canal Zone area, from January to April 1924. She then transferred to the West Coast, where she operated primarily in the waters off Southern California, until 1931. S-25 participated in Fleet Problems and division exercises, during that period, that took her back to the Panama Canal area, from March to May 1927, to Hawaii in 1927 and 1928, to the Panama Canal area again in February 1929, and to Hawaii, again in 1930.

S-25 departed San Diego, California, on 15 April 1931, and arrived at Pearl Harbor, in the Territory of Hawaii, on 25 April 1931. She operated in Hawaiian waters until 1939.

S-25 cleared Pearl Harbor, to return to the East Coast, on 16 June 1939, and arrived at New London, on 25 August 1939. Voyage repairs followed, and in February 1940, she was assigned to a test and evaluation division, at New London. In December 1940, she was detached and ordered to Key West, Florida, where she provided training services until May 1941. She then returned to New London, to prepare for transfer to the United Kingdom, under the terms of the Lend-Lease agreement. She was decommissioned on 4 November 1941.

=== Royal Navy ===
S-25 was transferred to the United Kingdom, on 4 November 1941, at Groton, Connecticut, and was renamed HMS P.551. Later the same day the Royal Navy loaned her to the Polish Navy.

=== Polish Navy ===
Polish Navy Lieutenant Commander Bolesław Romanowski accepted P.551, on behalf of the Polish government-in-exile, and she was commissioned as ORP Jastrząb.

Jastrząb sailed from New London, on 11 November 1941, along with P.511, for Portsmouth, New Hampshire, and continued on for St. John's, Newfoundland, arriving on 18 November 1941. She departed St. John's, on 18 November 1941, for the UK, where she rendezvoused with the trawler HMS Daneman, near Barra Head.

On 21 March 1942, Jastrząb began a training period at Holy Loch, in Scotland, before she could be deployed operationally.

She departed Lerwick, on 25 April 1942, to provide cover for Convoy PQ 15, sailing for Russia, on her first patrol.

On May 2, at 20:09, the destroyer HNoMS St. Albans and minesweeper HMS Seagull (J85), attacked a submerged contact at 73°01′N 17°32′E where German U-boats had been expected to be operating, with depth charges. Jastrząb had strayed 100 nmi (190 km; 120 mi) off her proper course and was mistakenly sunk by friendly fire. Five of her crew were killed, with the rest being picked up. Some accounts claim that it was the convoy that was out of position, having sailed off course to avoid icebergs, and that the crew was killed when they were strafed, even after showing the proper yellow smoke candles.

The crew of Jastrząb was awarded with the Cross of Valour, in September 1942, and on 13 July 1943, the commanders of St. Albans and Seagull were found guilty of sinking an Allied unit that was not in their assigned section of operation, by a Royal Navy Court.

She was scuttled at: 71°30′N 12°32′E

== Awards ==
- American Defense Service Medal

== Bibliography ==
- "Table 21 - Ships on Navy List June 30, 1919". Congressional Serial Set. U.S. Government Printing Office: 770. 1921.
- Friedman, Norman (1995). U.S. Submarines Through 1945: An Illustrated Design History. Annapolis, Maryland: Naval Institute Press. ISBN 1-55750-263-3.
- Priolo, Gary. "S-25 (SS-130)". Navsource.net.
- "S-25". Dictionary of American Naval Fighting Ships. Navy Department, Naval History and Heritage Command. 1 September 2015. This article incorporates text from this source, which is in the public domain.
- Hall, Anne Martin (1925). Ships of the United States navy and their sponsors, 1913-1923.
- Helgason, Guðmundur (August 2023). "ORP Jastrzab (P 551)". uboat.net.
- Helgason, Guðmundur. "S-25 (SS-130)". uboat.net.
