= Bolesław Romanowski =

Polish officer and submariner (1910–1968)

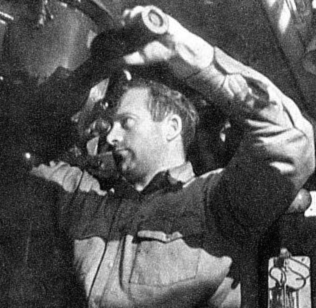
- kapitan Romanowski aboard ORP Dzik
- Born: 21 March 1910; Varakļāni, Russian Empire
- Died: 12 August 1968 (aged 58); Gdańsk
- Military career
- Allegiance: Poland
- Branch: Polish Navy
- Service years: 1929–1964
- Rank: Komandor captain
- Commands: ORP Sokół; ORP Jastrząb; ORP Dzik; ORP Błyskawica; ORP Sęp
- Conflicts: World War II
- Awards: Wound Decoration; Virtuti Militari (Silver Cross); Cross of Valour; Cross of Merit; Navy Medal; Medal for the Oder, the Nissa and the Baltic; Medal of Victory and Freedom 1945; Distinguished Service Cross; 1939–1945 Star; Atlantic Star; Africa Star; Italy Star; Defence Medal; War Medal 1939–1945

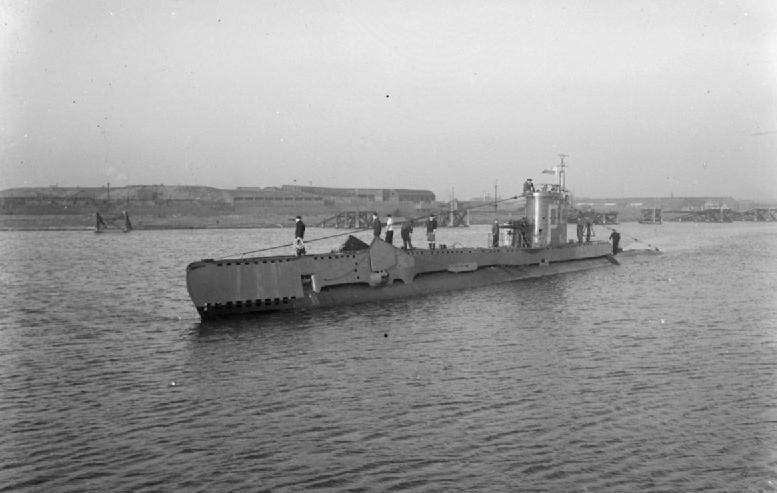
ORP Dzik

Bolesław Romanowski (21 March 1910 – 12 August 1968) was a submarine commander of the Polish Navy during World War II.

== Biography ==
Bolesław Szymon Romanowski was born in Varakļāni in Livonia. In 1920 he moved with his family to Grabówno in Greater Poland. In 1929 he graduated and entered the Polish Navy Academy. He completed the submarine navigation course then the underwater weapons training. He began his career on the torpedo boat ORP Kujawiak, in 1934 he became the executive officer of this ship. One year later he was transferred to the submarine ORP Żbik. He also served on ORP Wilia and ORP Wicher. Shortly before the start of World War II, he was transferred to the submarine ORP Wilk.

During the Invasion of Poland the Wilk operated in Gdańsk Bay, deployed her mines then left the Polish coast, successfully passing the Danish Straits (Øresund) on September 14/15, escaping from the Baltic Sea and arriving in Great Britain on September 20. In 1941 he became the executive officer on ORP Sokół, then he assumed command of ORP Jastrząb ex USS S-25 loaned to Polish Navy. Romanowski is the only Polish submarine commander to lead his vessel through the Atlantic Ocean.

During the passage of convoy PQ-15 to Murmansk, Jastrząb on 2 May 1942 was mistakenly engaged by the destroyer HNoMS St. Albans and the minesweeper HMS Seagull. She was attacked with depth charges and made to surface, there she was strafed with the loss of five crew (including British liaison officer) and six injured, including the commander. The ship was badly damaged and had to be scuttled, near 71°30′N 12°32′E. Romanowski was shot in both legs and hospitalized in Soviet Union. Then he came back to United Kingdom. In late 1942 he became commander of the submarine ORP Dzik. He sank five ships in the Mediterranean Sea and Aegean Sea. On 12 December 1944 he took command of ORP Sokół.

After the war ended Romanowski decided to come back to Poland. In 1947 he was designated commander of the destroyer ORP Błyskawica and brought the ship to Gdynia. After his comeback he was made commander of ORP Sęp then of the submarine flotilla. In 1950, during the Stalin repressions he was dismissed and arrested. After the Polish October he was incorporated in the Polish Navy. Between 1957 and 1961 he served in the General Staff of the Navy before becoming the deputy commander of the Polish Naval Academy. He was transferred to the reserve due to bad health in 1964.

Bolesław Romanowski died suddenly on 12 August 1968.

== Awards and decorations ==
Wound Decoration (Poland)
Virtuti Militari, Silver Cross (Poland)
Cross of Valour (Poland)
Silver Cross of Merit
Naval Medal four times
Medal for the Oder, the Nissa and the Baltic
Medal of Victory and Freedom 1945
Distinguished Service Cross
1939–1945 Star
Atlantic Star with France and Germany Clasp
Africa Star
Italy Star
Defence Medal
War Medal 1939–1945

== Military promotions ==
sub-lieutenant (podporucznik)	1932
lieutenant (porucznik)	1935
lieutenant commander (kapitan)	1940
commander (komandor podporucznik)	1944
captain (komandor porucznik)	1948
commodore (komandor)	1957
