= Beauvoir =

Beauvoir may refer to:

== People ==
- Cheridah de Beauvoir Stocks (1887–1971), British aviator
- Jean Beauvoir, American musician
- Joan de Beauvoir de Havilland, birth name of British actress Joan Fontaine (1917–2013)
- Marie-Louise de Beauvoir (1776–1855), Belgian pioneer educator
- Richard Benyon De Beauvoir (1769–1854), British Member of Parliament
- Roger de Beauvoir (1806–1866), pen name of French writer, Eugène Auguste Roger de Bully
- Simone de Beauvoir (1908–1986), French author, philosopher, and feminist
- Hélène de Beauvoir (1910–2001), French painter and sister of Simone de Beauvoir

== Places ==
=== France ===
- Beauvoir, Manche
- Beauvoir-de-Marc
- Beauvoir-en-Royans
- Beauvoir, Seine-et-Marne
- Beauvoir-Wavans
- Saint-Hilaire-de-Beauvoir
- Beaurevoir (formerly Beauvoir), Aisne

=== United Kingdom ===
- De Beauvoir (ward), a ward in the London Borough of Hackney
- De Beauvoir Town, a district in North London, England

== Other uses ==
- Beauvoir (Biloxi, Mississippi), post-American Civil War home of Jefferson Davis, President of the Confederate States
- Pontikokastro, a castle in southern Greece, known as Beauvoir by the Frankish Crusaders
- Beauvoir, an elementary school in Washington, D.C.; see National Cathedral School

== See also ==
- Belvoir (disambiguation), a synonymous name
- Passerelle Simone-de-Beauvoir, a pedestrian bridge across the Seine River in Paris, France
