= USS Thomas =

Two ships in the United States Navy have been named USS Thomas for Clarence Crase Thomas:

- USS Thomas (DD-182), a Wickes-class destroyer, launched in 1918 and transferred to the Royal Navy as HMS St Albans in 1940.
- USS Thomas (DE-102), a Cannon-class destroyer escort, launched in 1943, and transferred to Taiwan in 1946.

== See also ==
- USAT Thomas, ex-Minnewaska (Atlantic Transport Line) ex Persia (Hamburg-American Packet Company) steamer serving as U.S. Army Transport 1898–1929.
- USS Garfield Thomas
