= Clarence Thomas (disambiguation) =

Clarence Thomas (born 1948) is an Associate Justice on the Supreme Court of the United States.

Clarence Thomas may also refer to:

- Clarence Crase Thomas (1886–1917), U.S. naval officer
- Clarence Smedley Thomas, founder of the American Defense Society
- Clarence Thomas (American football) (1945–2011), American football coach
