= Convoy PQ 15 =

- Part of Arctic Convoys of the Second World War
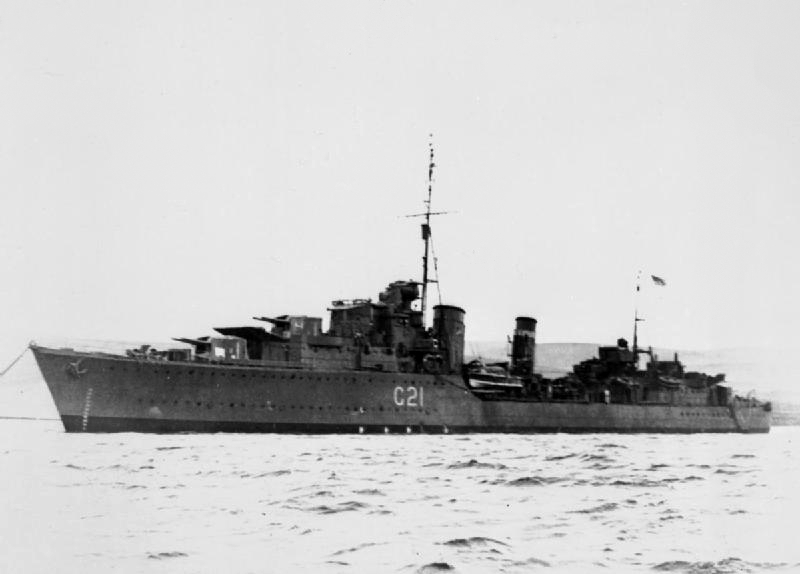
- HMS Punjabi, sunk after a collision
Date	26 April – 5 May 1942
Location	Norwegian Sea and Barents Sea

Belligerents
United Kingdom; United States; Soviet Union	Germany

Commanders and leaders
Convoy Commodore: Herbert Anchor; Close escort: John Crombie; Cruiser cover: Harold Burrough	Hubert Schmundt; Hans-Jürgen Stumpff

Strength
25 merchant ships; 38 escorts; 9 submarines	7 U-boats; Luftflotte 5

Casualties and losses
72 killed; 3 ships sunk	5 aircraft shot down

Convoy PQ 15 (26 April – 5 May 1942) was an Arctic convoy sent from Iceland by the Western Allies to aid the Soviet Union (USSR) during the Second World War. The convoy sailed on 26 April 1942, escorted by the western local escort and rendezvoused with the ocean escort on 28 April. The convoy sailed unknown to the Germans until around midnight on 30 April/1 May when it was spotted by a German reconnaissance aircraft when about 250 nmi (460 km; 290 mi) south-west of Bjørnøya (Bear Island).

Six Junkers Ju 88 bombers attacked the convoy and lost one aircraft for no result. On 2 May the convoy escorts depth-charged a U-boat that turned out to be the Polish submarine ORP Jastrząb, five of the crew being killed and six wounded before the mistake was recognised. The submarine was about 100 nmi (190 km; 120 mi) outside its patrol zone after not gaining a positional fix for a week due to the weather.

On 1 May, about 350 nmi (650 km; 400 mi) off Iceland, to the west,, the heavy cover of the Home Fleet and the US Navy Task Force 99, ran into fog and the destroyer HMS Punjabi received the signal to cease zig-zagging too late. The destroyer was hit amidships by the battleship HMS King George V, cut in two and sunk, 49 of the crew being killed and 206 survivors being rescued. On 3 May the convoy was surprised by six Heinkel He 111 torpedo-bombers that flew below radar cover and sank three ships for the loss of three bombers, a loss of 15,800 GRT of shipping, there being 137 survivors.

On 4 May, the eastern local escort of two Soviet destroyers, two patrol ships and three British minesweepers arrived, the ships and U-boats skirmishing for no result. The last air attack, by Junkers Ju 88 bombers, near-missed Cape Palliser for the loss of one bomber. The convoy arrived at Murmansk having lost three ships to air and U-boat attacks on 5 May. A big German effort against the reciprocal Convoy QP 11 contributed to the relatively untroubled progress of the convoy, despite being laden with supplies for the USSR.

== Background ==
=== Lend-lease ===
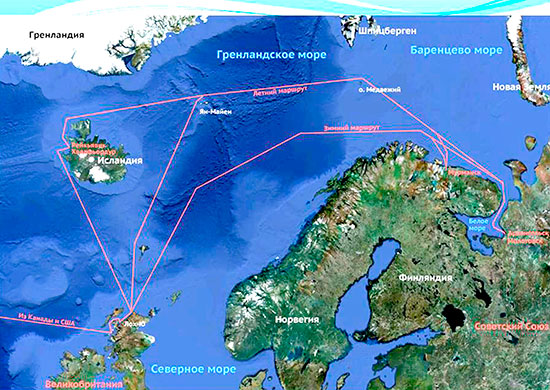
Russian map showing Arctic convoy routes from Britain and Iceland, past Norway to the Barents Sea and northern Russian ports

After Operation Barbarossa, the German invasion of the USSR, began on 22 June 1941, Britain and USSR signed an agreement in July that they would "render each other assistance and support of all kinds in the present war against Hitlerite Germany". Before September 1941 the British had dispatched 450 aircraft, 22,000 long tons (22,000 t) of rubber, 3,000,000 pairs of boots and stocks of tin, aluminium, jute, lead and wool. In September British and US representatives travelled to Moscow to study Soviet requirements and their ability to meet them. The representatives of the three countries drew up a protocol in October 1941 to last until June 1942 and to agree new protocols to operate from 1 July to 30 June of each following year until the end of Lend-Lease. The protocol listed supplies, monthly rates of delivery and totals for the period.

The first protocol specified the supplies to be sent but not the ships to move them. The USSR turned out to lack the ships and escorts and the British and Americans, who had made a commitment to "help with the delivery", undertook to deliver the supplies for want of an alternative. The main Soviet need in 1941 was military equipment to replace losses because, at the time of the negotiations, two large aircraft factories were being moved east from Leningrad and two more from Ukraine. It would take at least eight months to resume production, until when, aircraft output would fall from 80 to 30 aircraft per day. Britain and the US undertook to send 400 aircraft a month, at a ratio of three bombers to one fighter (later reversed), 500 tanks a month and 300 Bren gun carriers. The Anglo-Americans also undertook to send 42,000 long tons (43,000 t) of aluminium and 3, 862 machine tools, along with sundry raw materials, food and medical supplies.

=== British grand strategy ===
The growing German air strength in Norway and increasing losses to convoys and their escorts, led Rear-Admiral Stuart Bonham Carter, commander of the 18th Cruiser Squadron, Admiral sir John Tovey, Commander in Chief Home Fleet and Admiral Sir Dudley Pound the First Sea Lord, the professional head of the Royal Navy, unanimously to advocate the suspension of Arctic convoys during the summer months. The small number of Russian ships available to meet Arctic convoys, losses inflicted by Luftflotte 5 based in Norway and the presence of the German battleship Tirpitz in Norway from early 1942, had led to a large number of ships full of supplies to Russia becoming stranded at the west end and empty and damaged ships waiting at the east end.

Despite the views of the Navy, Churchill came under pressure from the president of the United States, Franklin D. Roosevelt and the Soviet leader, Joseph Stalin, bowed to political reality and ordered the dispatch of a larger convoy to reduce the backlog,

The operation is justified if half gets through. Failure on our part to make the attempt would weaken our influence with both our major allies.

Convoy PQ 13 had been the first convoy to suffer serious casualties, five ships being sunk by submarines, aircraft and surface ships. Tovey asked the Russians for more submarine patrols in the Barents Sea and more destroyer escorts for the final leg of the convoys. More escorts were diverted from Western Approaches Command to increase the close escort to about ten vessels. Bomber Command had sent 33 Halifax heavy bombers to attack Tirpitz on 31 March in exceedingly poor weather, through which few aircraft managed to bomb. No hits were obtained and five of the Halifaxes were shot down. Convoy PQ 14 was considerably larger than earlier convoys.

=== Signals intelligence ===
==== Ultra ====
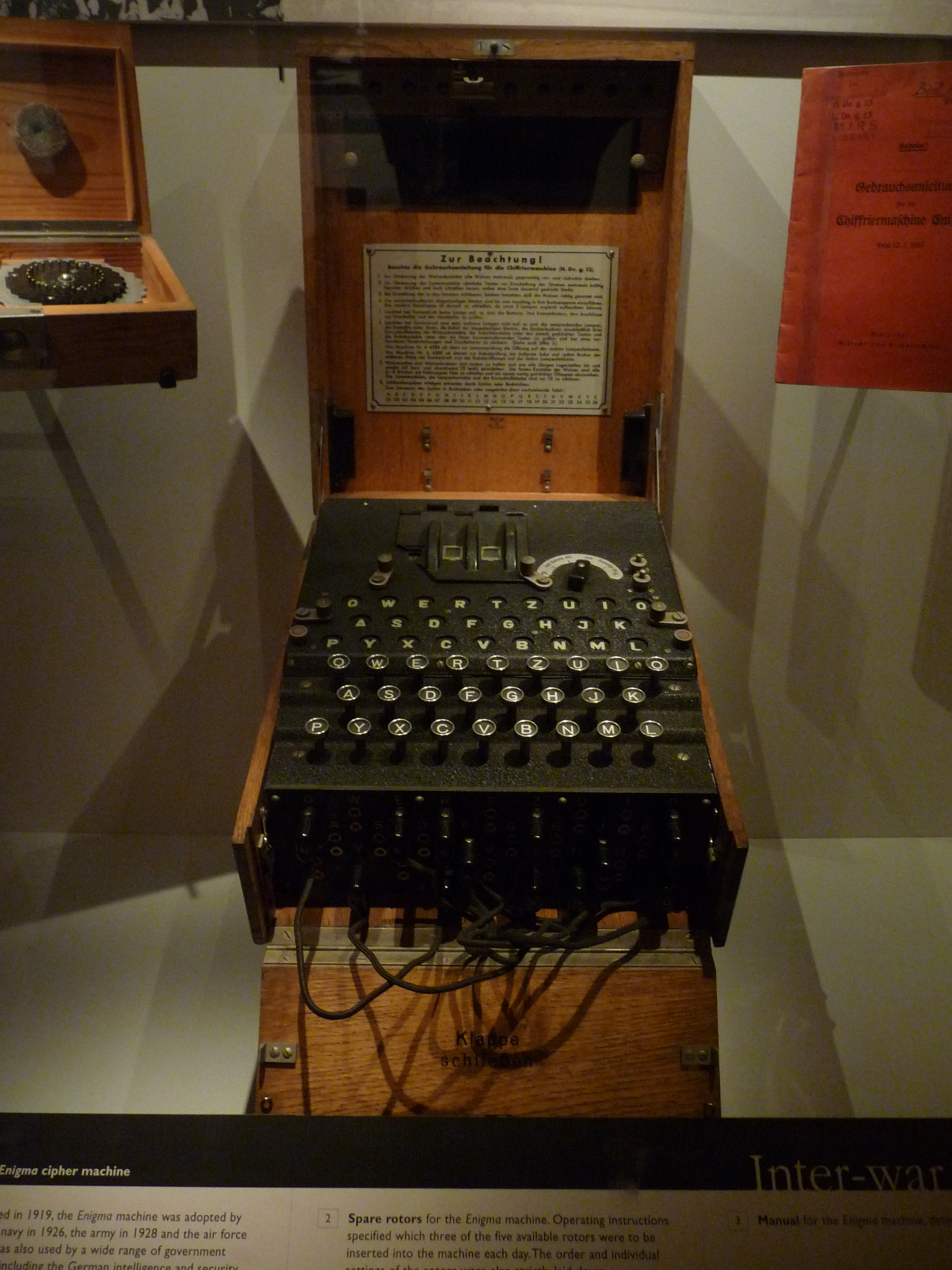
Photograph of a German Enigma coding machine

The British Government Code and Cypher School (GC&CS) based at Bletchley Park housed a small industry of code-breakers and traffic analysts that intercepted and decoded German naval transmissions. By June 1941, the German Enigma machine Home Waters (Heimish) settings used by surface ships and U-boats could quickly be read. On 1 February 1942, the Enigma machines used in U-boats in the Atlantic and Mediterranean were changed but German ships and the U-boats in Arctic waters continued with the older Heimish (Hydra from 1942, code-named Dolphin by the British). By mid-1941, British Y-stations were able to read Luftwaffe wireless telegraphy (W/T) transmissions and give advance warning of Luftwaffe operations. In 1941, interception parties (code-named Headaches) embarked on warships. Enigma decrypts were used twice to tell Convoy PQ 14 that the big German ships had not sailed.

==== B-Dienst ====
The rival German Beobachtungsdienst (B-Dienst, Observation Service) of the Kriegsmarine Marinenachrichtendienst (MND, Naval Intelligence Service) had broken several Admiralty codes and cyphers by 1939, which were used to help Kriegsmarine ships elude British forces and provide opportunities for surprise attacks. From June to August 1940, six British submarines were sunk in the Skaggerak using information gleaned from British wireless signals. In 1941, B-Dienst read signals from the Commander in Chief Western Approaches informing convoys of areas patrolled by U-boats, enabling the submarines to move into "safe" zones. B-Dienst had broken Naval Cypher No 3 in February 1942 and by March was reading up to 80 per cent of the traffic, which continued until 15 December 1943. By coincidence, the British lost access to the Shark cypher and had no information to send in Cypher No 3 which might compromise Ultra.

=== Kriegsmarine ===
Kriegsmarine in red, Luftwaffe in blue, North Cape in green

Two U-boats were based in Norway in July 1941, four in September, five in December and two in January 1942, seven in February, nine in March and one in April, 23 boats in all, a number maintained for the rest of the year. Hitler contemplated establishing a unified command but decided against it. The German battleship Tirpitz arrived at Trondheim on 16 January, the first ship of a general move of surface ships to Norway. British convoys to Russia had received little attention in 1941, since they averaged only eight ships each and the long Arctic winter nights negated even the limited Luftwaffe reconnaissance effort that was available.

Tirpitz had arrived at Trondheim on 16 January, followed on 23 February by the cruisers Prinz Eugen and Admiral Scheer. On 21 March the cruiser Admiral Hipper arrived and on 26 May Lutzow joined the flotilla. The transfer of more U-boats to Norway in 1942 along with the ships allowed the Kriegsmarine to contemplate more ambitious operations against Arctic convoys. In May, despite the increased number of aircraft available to Luftflotte 5, Marine Gruppe Kommando Nord (MGK Nord) was sceptical of the ability to find the British distant escorts, despite the better weather at this time of year, because of the area of sea to be covered. Knowledge of the British dispositions was necessary if the big German ships were to be risked against a convoy.

=== Luftflotte 5 ===
In March 1942, Adolf Hitler issued a directive for a greater anti-convoy effort to weaken the Red Army and prevent Allied troops being transferred to northern Russia, preparatory to a landing on the coast of northern Norway. Luftflotte 5 (Generaloberst Hans-Jürgen Stumpff) was to be reinforced and the Kriegsmarine was ordered to put an end to Arctic convoys and naval incursions. The Luftwaffe and Kriegsmarine were to work together with a simplified command structure, which was implemented after a conference; the Navy had preferred joint command but the Luftwaffe insisted on the exchange of liaison officers. Luftflotte 5 was to be reinforced by 2./Kampfgeschwader 30 (KG 30) which was to increase its readiness for operations. A squadron of Aufklärungsflieger Gruppe 125 (Aufkl.Fl.Gr. 125) was transferred to Norway and more long-range Focke-Wulf Fw 200 Kondor patrol aircraft from Kampfgeschwader 40 (KG 40) were sent from France. At the end of March, the air fleet was divided. Fliegerführer Nord (Ost) [Oberst Alexander Holle], the largest command, was based at Kirkenes with 2./JG 5, 10.(Z)/JG 5, 1./StG 5 (Dive Bomber Wing 5) and 1.Fernaufklärungsgruppe 124 [1./(F) 124] (1 Squadron, Long Range Reconnaissance Wing 124) charged with attacks on Murmansk and Archangelsk as well as attacks on convoys.

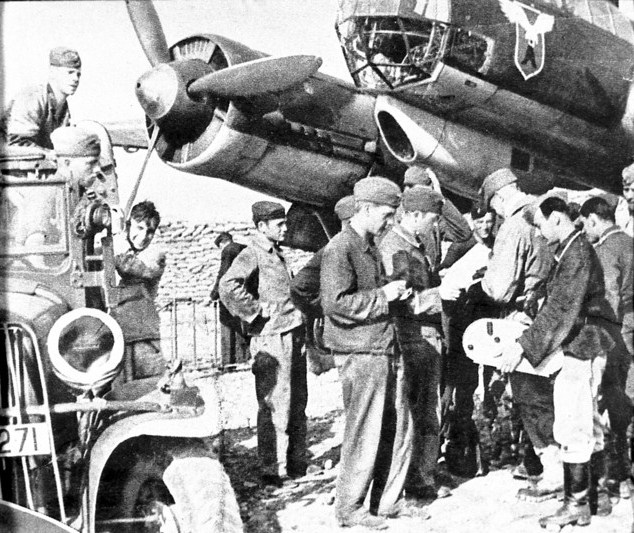
Junkers Ju 88 D-2 of 1. Staffel der Fernaufklärungsgruppe 124 (1.(F)/124, 1st Squadron of Long-Range Reconnaissance Wing 124), presumably in Kirkenes/Northern Norway, 1942. A film cassette is handed over to the photo development and evaluation centre.

Part of Fliegerführer Nord (Ost) was based at Petsamo (5./JG 5, 6./JG 5 and 3./Kampfgeschwader 26 (3./KG 26), Banak (2./KG 30, 3./KG 30 and 1./(F) 22) and Billefjord (1./Kü.Fl.Gr. 125). Fliegerführer Lofoten (Oberst Hans Roth) was based at Bardufoss but had no permanently attached units, which were added according to events. At the start of the anti-shipping campaign only the coastal patrol squadrons 3./Küstenfliegergruppe 906 at Trondheim and 1./1./Kü.Fl.Gr. 123 at Tromsø were attached to Fliegerführer Lofoten. Fliegerführer Nord (West) was based at Sola and was responsible for the early detection of convoys and attacks south of a line from Trondheim westwards to Shetland and Iceland, with 1./(F) 22, the Kondors of 1./KG 40, short-range coastal reconnaissance squadrons 1./Küstenfliegergruppe 406 (1./Kü.Fl.Gr. 406), 2./ Küstenfliegergruppe 406 (2./Kü.Fl.Gr. 406) and a weather reconnaissance squadron.

=== Luftwaffe tactics ===
As soon as information was received about the assembly of a convoy, Fliegerführer Nord (West) would send long-range reconnaissance aircraft to search Iceland and northern Scotland. Once a convoy was spotted aircraft were to keep contact as far as possible in the extreme weather of the area. If contact was lost its course at the last sighting would be extrapolated and overlapping sorties would be flown to regain contact. All three Fliegerführer were to co-operate as the convoy moved through their operational areas. Fliegerführer Lofoten would begin the anti-convoy operation west of a line from the North Cape to Spitzbergen Island, whence Fliegerführer Nord (Ost) would take over further eastwards, using his and Fliegerführer Lofoten's aircraft, which would fly to Kirkenes or Petsamo to stay in range. Fliegerführer Nord (Ost) was not allowed to divert aircraft to ground support during the operation. As soon as the convoy came into range, the aircraft were to keep up a continuous attack until the convoy docked at Murmansk or Arkhangelsk.

==== Air-sea rescue ====
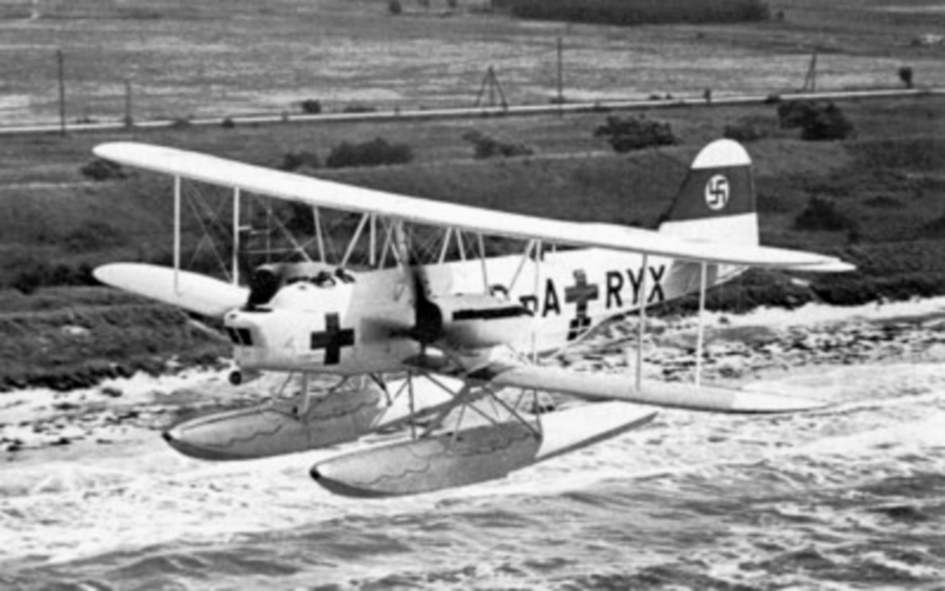
Example of a Heinkel He 59 search and rescue aircraft (1940)

The Luftwaffe Sea Rescue Service (Seenotdienst) along with the Kriegsmarine, the Norwegian Society for Sea Rescue (RS) and ships on passage, recovered aircrew and shipwrecked sailors. The service comprised Seenotbereich VIII at Stavanger covering Stavanger, Bergen and Trondheim and Seenotbereich IX at Kirkenes for Tromsø, Billefjord and Kirkenes. Co-operation was as important in rescues as it was in anti-shipping operations if people were to be saved before they succumbed to the climate and severe weather. The sea rescue aircraft comprised Heinkel He 59 floatplanes, Dornier Do 18 and Dornier Do 24 seaplanes.

Oberkommando der Luftwaffe (OKL, the high command of the Luftwaffe) was not able to increase the number of search and rescue aircraft in Norway, due to a general shortage of aircraft and crews, despite Stumpff pointing out that coming down in such cold waters required extremely swift recovery and that his crews "must be given a chance of rescue" or morale could not be maintained. After the experience of PQ 16, Stumpff gave the task to the coastal reconnaissance squadrons, whose aircraft were not usually engaged in attacks on convoys. They would henceforth stand by to rescue aircrew during anti-shipping operations.

== Prelude ==
=== Arctic Ocean ===
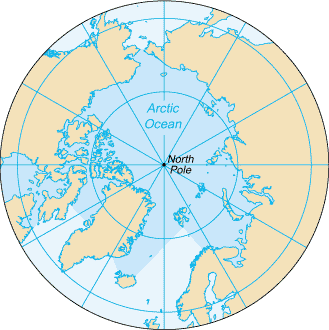
Diagram of the Arctic Ocean

Between Greenland and Norway are some of the most stormy waters of the world's oceans, 890 mi (1,440 km) of water under gales full of snow, sleet and hail. Around the North Cape and the Barents Sea the sea temperature rarely rises above 4° Celsius and a man in the water would probably die unless rescued immediately. The cold water and air made spray freeze on the superstructure of ships, which had to be removed quickly to avoid the ship becoming top-heavy. The cold Arctic water was met by the Gulf Stream, warm water from the Gulf of Mexico, which became the North Atlantic Drift. Arriving at the south-west of England, the drift moves between Scotland and Iceland. north of Norway the drift splits.

A northern stream goes north of Bear Island to Svalbard and the southern stream follows the coast of Murmansk into the Barents Sea. The mingling of cold Arctic water and warmer water of higher salinity generates thick banks of fog for convoys to hide in. The waters drastically reduce the effectiveness of Asdic as U-boats moved in waters of differing temperatures and density. In winter, polar ice can form as far south as 50 mi (80 km) of the North Cape, forcing ships closer to Luftwaffe air bases and in summer it can recede to Svalbard, ships being able to sail further out to sea. The area is in perpetual darkness in winter and permanent daylight in the summer, that makes air reconnaissance almost impossible or easy.

=== Arctic convoys ===
Location of Bjørnøya (Bear Island)

In October 1941, the Prime Minister, Winston Churchill, made a commitment to send a convoy to the Arctic ports of the USSR every ten days and to deliver 1,200 tanks a month from July 1942 to January 1943, followed by 2,000 tanks and another 3,600 aircraft in excess of those already promised. (Note: In October 1941, the unloading capacity of Archangel was 300,000 long tons (300,000 t), Vladivostok (Pacific Route) 140,000 long tons (140,000 t) and 60,000 long tons (61,000 t) in the Persian Gulf (for the Persian Corridor route) ports.) The first convoy was due at Murmansk around 12 October and the next convoy was to depart Iceland on 22 October. A motley of British, Allied and neutral shipping loaded with military stores and raw materials for the Soviet war effort would be assembled at Hvalfjörður in Iceland, convenient for ships from both sides of the Atlantic.

By late 1941, the convoy system used in the Atlantic had been established on the Arctic run; a convoy commodore ensured that the ships' masters and signals officers attended a briefing to make arrangements for the management of the convoy, which sailed in a formation of long rows of short columns. The commodore was usually a retired naval officer or a Royal Naval Reserveist and would be aboard one of the merchant ships (identified by a white pendant with a blue cross). The commodore was assisted by a Naval signals party of four men, who used lamps, semaphore flags and telescopes to pass signals in code.

In large convoys, the commodore was assisted by vice- and rear-commodores with whom he directed the speed, course and zig-zagging of the merchant ships and liaised with the escort commander. (Note: The codebooks were carried in a weighted bag which was to be dumped overboard to prevent capture.) By the end of 1941, 187 Matilda II and 249 Valentine tanks had been delivered, comprising 25 per cent of the medium-heavy tanks in the Red Army and 30 to 40 per cent of the medium-heavy tanks defending Moscow. In December 1941, 16 per cent of the fighters defending Moscow were Hurricanes and Tomahawks from Britain.

75th parallel north (interactive map)

By 1 January 1942, 96 Hurricanes were flying in the Soviet Air Forces (Voyenno-Vozdushnye Sily, VVS). The British supplied radar apparatuses, machine tools, Asdic and other equipment. During the summer months, convoys went as far north as the 75th parallel north, then south into the Barents Sea and to the ports of Murmansk in the Kola Inlet and Archangel in the White Sea. In winter, due to the Polar ice expanding southwards, the convoy route ran closer to Norway. The voyage was between 1,400 and 2,000 nmi (2,600 and 3,700 km; 1,600 and 2,300 mi) each way, taking at least three weeks for a round trip.

== Ships ==
On 10 April, part of Convoy PQ 15 sailed from Oban in Scotland, to Reykjavík in Iceland. The convoy was led by the Convoy Commodore, Captain H. J. Anchor RNR in SS Botavon and consisted of 25 merchant ships, 15 US, 8 British, one Soviet and one Panamanian ship, several of which were early returns from Convoy PQ 14. A CAM ship, SS Empire Morn, joined an Arctic convoy for the first time, with its Hurricane fighter, a wooden mock-up to take its place and a spare, crated below, to be assembled for the return journey. The convoy was accompanied by Force Q, the oiler RFA Gray Ranger and its destroyer escort, HMS Ledbury, to join from Seyðisfjörður on the east coast, on 29 June. The convoy had two icebreakers, the Soviet Krassin and the Canadian Montcalm. Commander John Crombie was the Senior Officer escort and commanded the Halcyon-class minesweepers HMS Bramble, HMS Leda and HMS Seagull and the anti-submarine trawlers HMT Cape Palliser, Chiltern, Northern Pride and Vizalma.

5th meridian east (interactive map)

The ocean escort consisted of the destroyers HMS Boadicea, Matchless, Somali, Venomous, the Norwegian HNoMS St. Albans and the anti-aircraft auxiliary cruiser HMS Ulster Queen, that carried six director-controlled 4-inch anti-aircraft guns, four twin 2-pounder pom-poms and ten Oerlikon 20 mm cannon. For the first time, a submarine, HMS Sturgeon was to accompany an Arctic convoy, to about the 5th meridian east, detach on 1 May and to join the south end of the submarine covering patrols of ORP Jastrząb, HMS Unison, Minerve and HNoMS Uredd off the Norwegian coast. With more hours of daylight, the submarine patrols were to operate about 150 nmi (280 km; 170 mi) off the coast to surface and recharge their batteries beyond the range of Luftwaffe coastal reconnaissance. (Note: From January 1942, after the arrival of Tirpitz, a standing patrol of two submarines had been established at the Frohavet Channel to the north-west of Trondheim, to ambush German ships and where Seawolf saw Tirpitz when it sailed to attack Convoy PQ 12. As daylight hours increased, the submarines were withdrawn from the Norwegian coast and the area to cover increased enormously. The British only had ten submarines available and struggled to keep more than five submarines on Arctic convoy protection operations, leaving many gaps through which German ships could sail.)

Cruiser cover comprised HMS Nigeria (Rear-Admiral Harold Burrough) a Fiji-class cruiser was to join the escorts from 28 April to 1 May and the heavy cruiser HMS London from 30 April to 1 May. The US Task Force 39 (later 99) Rear-Admiral Robert C. Giffen, USN) had joined the Home Fleet on 3 April. A Distant Covering Force (Tovey) comprised the battleships HMS King George V and USS Washington The aircraft carrier HMS Victorious, the heavy cruisers USS Tuscaloosa and Wichita, the light cruiser Kenya and the US destroyers USS Madison, Plunkett, Wainwright and Wilson, with the British destroyers HMS Belvoir, Escapade, Faulknor, Hursley, Inglefield, Lamerton, Marne, Martin, Middleton, Oribi and Punjabi.

== Voyage ==
=== 26 April − 1 May ===
The convoy departed Reykjavík for Murmansk on 26 April 1942 with 25 merchant ships, two of them ice-breakers. The convoy was escorted by the western local escort and rendezvoused with the ocean escort on 28 April. Around midnight on 30 April/1 May, a German reconnaissance aircraft sighted the convoy when it was 250 nmi (460 km; 290 mi) south-west of Bjørnøya (Bear Island) not long before the cruiser cover arrived. There was low cloud, snow and showers that cloaked the ships and no air attacks but there were plenty of U-boat contacts and escorts dropping depth-charges. At 10:00 p.m. on 1 May, six Junkers Ju 88 bombers appeared and bombed, "a ragged and poorly executed attack". The first bomber made for London and was shot down; the wreck being trampled under the bows of Nigeria. Other bombers attacked a trawler on the right flank of the convoy but were deterred by the volume of anti-aircraft fire and sheered off. Later on, Force Q detached to fuel the escorts of the reciprocal Convoy QP 11 and Sturgeon departed to join the coastal patrol. At midnight, London turned westwards.

==== Punjabi ====
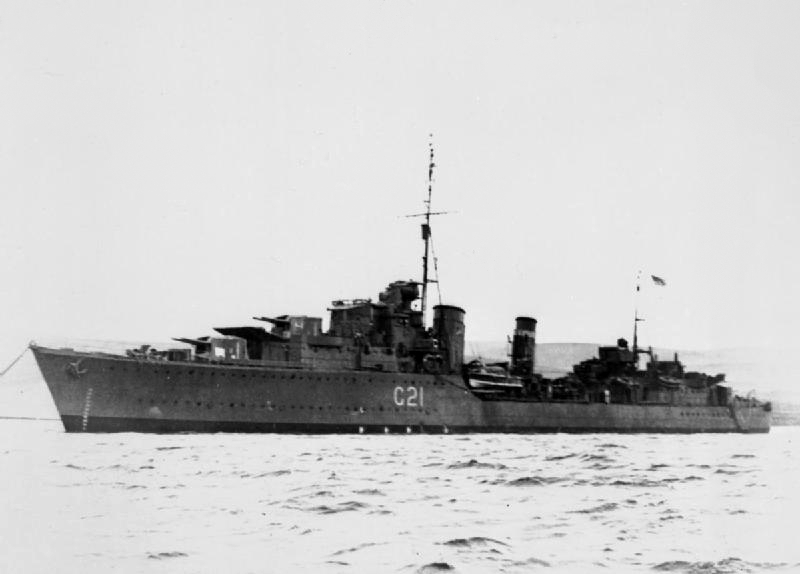
HMS Punjabi early in the war.

As the heavy cover cruised about 350 nmi (650 km; 400 mi) off Iceland, the big ships screened by destroyers the ships ran into fog and King George V (KGV) signalled for zig-zagging to stop. The destroyer Punjabi failed to sail straight quickly enough to avoid crossing the bows of KGV and was cut in half. The disaster was made worse when the depth charges on Punjabi exploded as the rear of the ship sank, killing many members of the Punjabi crew and adding to the damage to the bow of KGV. The front half of Punjabi stayed on the surface for about forty minutes and 206 men were rescued. Vice-Admiral Alban Curteis arrived from Hvalfjörður the next day with HMS Duke of York, another King George V-class battleship, into which the commander of the Home Fleet Admiral John Tovey transferred his flag. Curteis went back to Scapa Flow in KGV, that then went on to Liverpool for repairs.

=== 2 May ===
During the morning, Nigeria detached to join London to wait for Convoy QP 11, west of Bjørnøya. The crews of convoy PQ 15 viewed the departure of the cruiser cover with foreboding, something shared by the crews of the close escort. The diversion of the cruisers was somewhat premature as Convoy QP 11 crossed with the convoy as it headed east-north-east. Somali was sent to meed Convoy QP 11 and leaned that the convoy had been struggling through ice, U-boats, destroyers and torpedo-bombers. The convoy continued eastwards under observation by aircraft and U-boats, turning south to avoid the ice; another storm began that concealed the convoy. During the evening, Seagull and St Albans obtained an Asdic contact and depth-charged a U-boat to the surface. After opening fire, the escorts discovered that the U-boat was the Polish Jastrząb. The convoy continued eastwards into the night through a cold surface mist, visibility varying abruptly from 4 to .5 nmi (7.41 to 0.93 km; 4.60 to 0.58 mi). In such conditions of cold and variable visibility a lookout could remain effective for about an hour, the cold, mist, twilight and snow tending to induce physical rigidity and loss of alertness.

==== Jastrząb ====
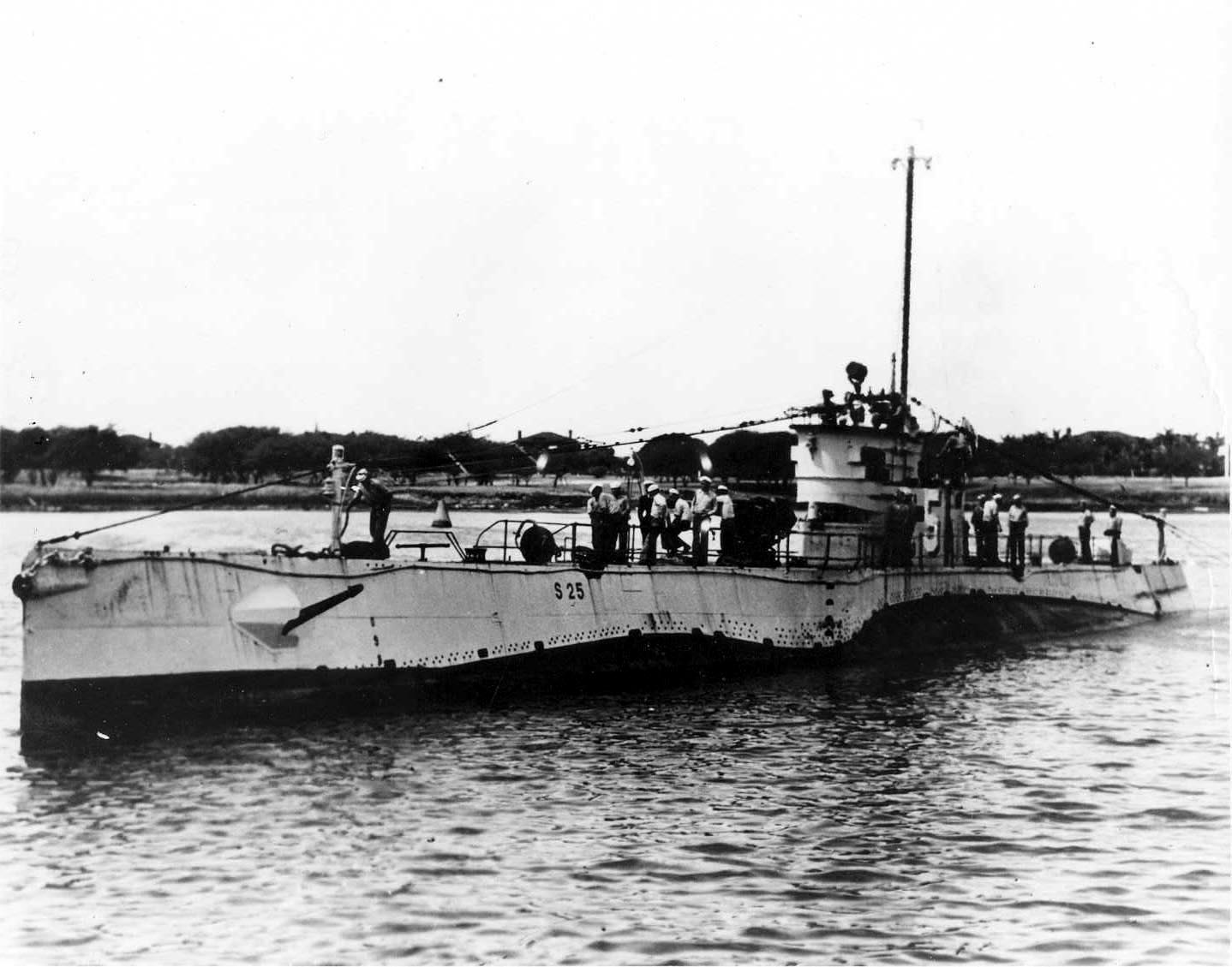
Photograph of USS S-25 before its transfer to the Polish Navy in 1941.

The Polish submarine Jastrząb (Lieutenant-Commander Bolesław Romanowski) had sailed from Holy Loch on 22 April, with a British liaison officer and two signallers for its patrol zone 180 nmi (330 km; 210 mi) to the north-west of Altafjord. Romanowski was a trained and experienced navigator and he patrolled his zone for a week, once crash-diving on spotting an aircraft; a hydroplane jammed, the submarine going deep under water before control was recovered. The aircraft proved friendly and the crew later found that there was a fuel leak. At 4:00 p.m. on 2 May, when at periscope depth, Romanowski spotted a U-boat on the surface but was unable to attack because of more difficulty in trimming the boat. Three hours later, there was another alert and at 7:45 p.m. Romanoswki saw ships approaching through a snowstorm. Having checked the ship recognition books he was satisfied that they were not German, altered course and ordered recognition flares to be released.

Neither Seagull or St Albans saw the recognition flares and began depth-charging, breaching the hull, seawater leaking into its batteries and causing chlorine gas to circulate; Romanowski blew the tanks and surfaced. The submarine rose between Seagull and St Albans, pointing towards St Albans that immediately opened fire. Romanowski, his liaison officer, the signallers and the bridge-crew rushed up into the conning tower and both ships fired with machine-guns, killing the signallers, three crewmen and wounding Romanowski, the liaison officer and four others before observers on Seagull realised the error and got the firing stopped. Boats were launched and the survivors rescued, Romanowski bringing the confidential books with him, despite five gunshot wounds. Jastrząb was scuttled by Seagull and the survivors were later taken on by London An inquiry found that Jastrząb was about 100 nmi (190 km; 120 mi) from its area in the submarine patrol line, no navigational fix having been possible for a week and the convoy had diverted southwards to keep away from the ice reported by Convoy QP 11.

=== 3 May ===
At 1:30 a.m. on 3 May, when the convoy was at 73°00′N, 19°40′E, in the twilight of the midnight sun, six Heinkel He 111 bombers of I./Kampfgeschwader 26, the Luftwaffe's new torpedo bomber force, made the first German torpedo bomber attack of the war. The bombers attacked under the radar coverage of the convoy at the forward right flank and achieved surprise. Despite the lack of warning, a huge volume of fire erupted from the ships that hit three of the Heinkels, two being shot down and one crashing later. Botavon, Cape Corso were torpedoes and sunk, Juland was damaged, 72 crewmen killed with 120 survivors. The cargo lost in the ships included 73 tanks, 21 aircraft, 101 lorries, 2,000,000 rounds of ammunition, 600 long tons (610 t) of tin, 175 long tons (178 t) of machine tools. The hulk of Jutland was later finished off by U-251. After the attack, there were many U-boat sightings and Asdic alarms but the U-boats were kept at bay by the escorts. At 10:30 p.m. there was another air attack, by Junkers Ju 88 bombers, when the convoy was at 73°00′N, 31°15′E, Cape Palliser being near-missed with slight damage for the loss of one Ju 88.

=== 4−5 May ===
On 4 May, the eastern local escort of the Soviet destroyers Gremyashchy and Sokrushitelny, two storoshevoi korabi (SKR, patrol ships) and three British minesweepers joined the convoy. Skirmishing with U-boats continued until late on 4 May when a south-easterly gale began to blow, snow clouds concealing the convoy that put in to the Kola Inlet during the evening of 5 May.

== Aftermath ==
=== Analysis ===
From late March to late May the air effort against Convoy PQ 13, Convoy PQ 14, PQ 15 and Convoy QP 9, Convoy QP 10 and Convoy QP 11 had little effect, twelve sinkings out of 16 lost in PQ convoys and two out of five sinkings from QP convoys being credited to the Luftwaffe; 166 merchant ships had sailed for Russia and 145 had survived the journey. Bad weather had been nearly as dangerous as the Luftwaffe but in April, the spring thaw grounded many Luftwaffe aircraft and in May bad weather led to contact being lost and convoys scattering, being impossible to find in the long Arctic night. When air attacks on convoys had taken place, the formations rarely amounted to more than twelve aircraft, greatly simplifying the task of convoy anti-aircraft gunners, who shot down several aircraft in April and May. Failings in liaison between the Luftwaffe and Kriegsmarine were revealed and tactical co-operation greatly enhanced, Hermann Böhm (Kommandierender Admiral Norwegen) noting that in the operation against Convoy PQ 15 and the reciprocal Convoy QP 11, there were no problems in co-operation between aircraft, submarines and destroyers. From 152 aircraft in January, reinforcements to Luftflotte 5 increased its strength to 221 front-line aircraft by March 1942. (Note: By May Luftflotte 5 had 264 aircraft based around the North Cape in northern Norway, consisting of 108 Junkers Ju 88 long-range bombers, 42 Heinkel He 111 torpedo-bombers, 15 Heinkel He 115 float-plane torpedo-bombers, 30 Junkers Ju 87 dive-bombers and 74 long range Focke Wulf 200s, Junkers 88s and Blohm & Voss BV 138s.)

=== Casualties ===
The ships Botavon, Cape Corso and Jutland were sunk with the loss of 120 members of their crews. No U-boats were sunk and five bombers of Luftflotte 5 were shot down. The lost ships amounted to a 12 per cent loss and the loss from the reciprocal Convoy QP 11 was 8 per cent were not unusually high, relative to Atlantic and Mediterranean convoys.

=== Strategic assessments ===
==== German ====
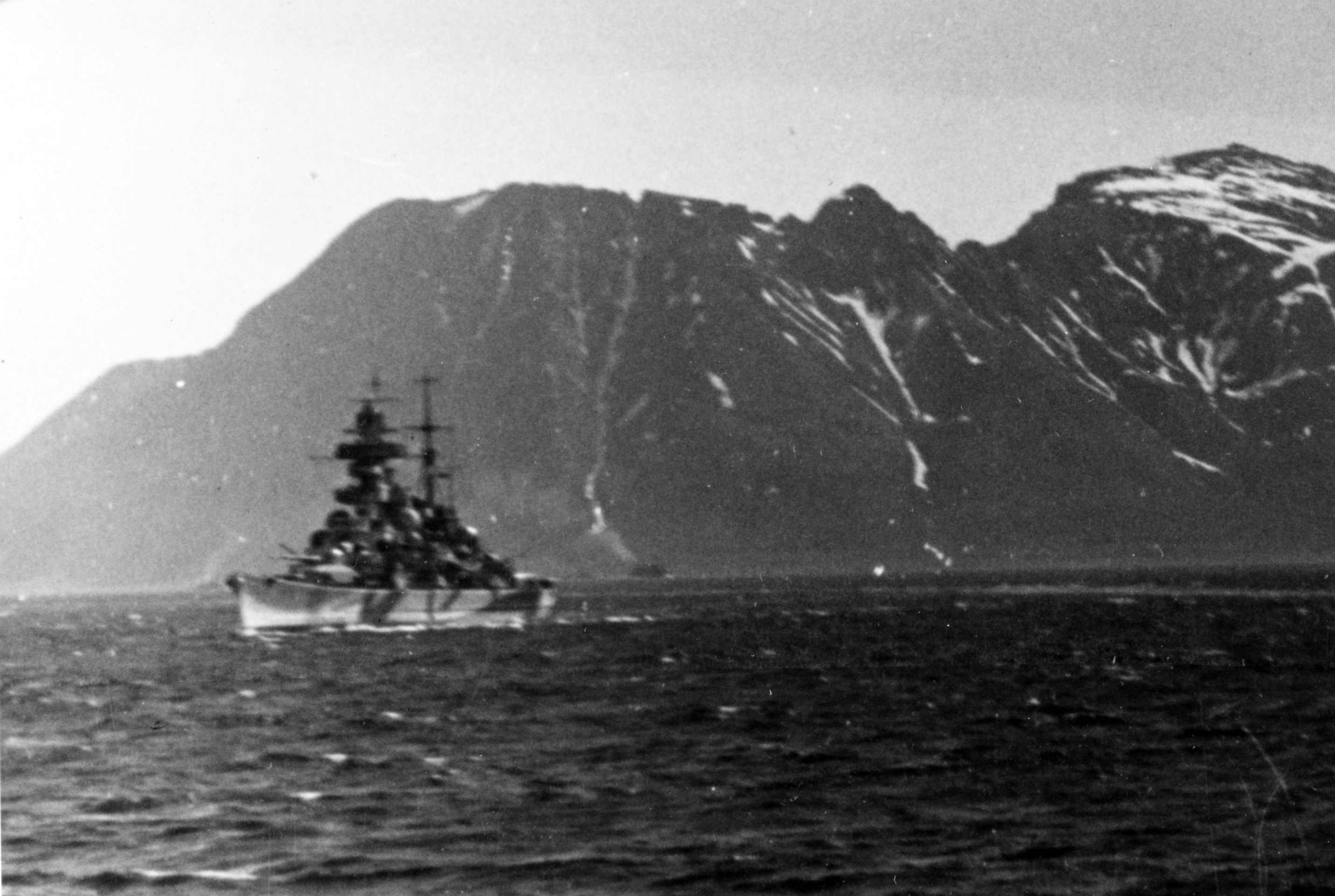
Admiral Hipper in Norway

On 12 May, SKL judged that the British and Americans were well aware of the importance of shipments to the Soviet Union, when Case Blue, the second German attempt to knock the USSR out of the war was due. Intelligence reports referred to much bigger convoys, along with raids and a landing in northern Norway to stop the German forces there from intervening, raids being the more likely threat. From the start of May the big ships that could sortie against a convoy comprised the battleship Tirpitz, the heavy cruisers Admiral Scheer and Admiral Hipper with six destroyers and six torpedo boats (small destroyers). The heavy cruiser Lützow was due at Trondheim in mid-May and the last ten destroyers of the Kriegsmarine would be ready for Norway in June. On 9 May, Admiral Scheer transferred from Trondheim to Narvik, closer to the convoy route, as did Schmundt with Z34 and Z35 to be followed by Lützow and another two destroyers.

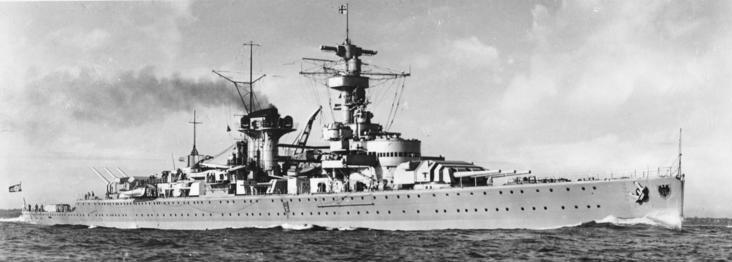
Panzerschiff Lützow at sea

As SKL prepared to for more ambitious use of its ships, the tactical limits it imposed led to some bemusement amongst the senior officers. Less was expected of the U-boat force, because night attacks, so successful in the Atlantic, were impossible in the long daylight hours of the midnight sun when it was difficult to stalk convoys and to evade attacks from escorts that were liable to emerge suddenly from patches of fog and rain. Until August, SKL anticipated only "minor and purely accidental" success and so it would be futile to reinforce the Arctic U-boats. As usual, Rear-Admiral Karl Dönitz, the Befehlshaber der U-Boote, wanted the U-boats back in the Atlantic and equally predictably, SKL took the view that even rare sinkings were worth the diversion of U-boats to the Arctic. In the ten months to the end of April 1942, 32 U-boats operated in the Arctic, when 27 Arctic convoys of 309 ships had been run and two U-boats sunk for the loss of six ships. In North American waters, from January 1942, 25 boats had sunk 336 ships of 1.8 million GRT.

==== British ====
On 29 April, Oliver Lyttleton, the Minister of Production since 12 March, presented a review of the Arctic convoys. The review concluded that the Soviet Union would face the main German effort of 1942 and that Britain must guard against the USSR making a separate peace by making a maximum effort to deliver military equipment. Britain must choose between a Second Front in 1942 or send as much assistance to the Soviet Union, even if this was detrimental to the war economy. Britain should sent the most potent weapons and ensure that they were delivered before the German summer offensive began, that a diminution of deliveries could affect the morale of the industrial workforce in Britain. The last conclusion was that the only way to get British-made tanks into action was through the Red Army (ignoring North Africa and the Far East) and that more tanks mattered more than more aircraft.

The document was rare in its emphasis the relationship between operations on the continent and support for Russia. Despite the significance of this point, discussion concentrated on whether to cut First Protocol April and May aircraft exports by 40 per cent and how to send 50 per cent more tanks and aircraft for the first half of the Second Protocol, due to begin on 1 July. Aircraft deliveries were already 136 short but crises in North Africa and the Far East could not be ignored. The danger of the looming second German attempt to defeat the USSR meant that it was most important that the First Protocol be met. The Air Ministry should meet the shortage by other means than cutting the supply of aircraft to Russia and Lyttleton thought that British tank production would fund a 50% increase in exports to the USSR and that this would placate the Russians for not increasing the number aircraft supplied but a decision was postponed. The Second Protocol (1 July 1942 to 1 July 1943) requirements from the Russians were for about 10.5 million tons of supplies, with 8.3 million tons coming from the US.

The American authorities calculated that the Russians could only import about 3,000,000 long tons (3,000,000 t) in Arctic convoys. The Admiralty considered that no more than 25 ships could be escorted in one convoy and that only three convoys could be run in eight weeks. Even if some British commitments could be met by the US the British would need 10 per cent more ships and that the prospect for a big increase in Arctic deliveries above the 320,000 long tons (330,000 t) delivered offered no certainty that Soviet port facilities could handle 3,000,000 long tons (3,000,000 t). Ships had been carrying an average of 3,000 long tons (3,000 t) and US assumptions were based on double this and the burden of protecting Arctic and Persian Gulf convoys carrying mainly US supplies would fall on the Royal Navy, against the increasing intensity of German counter-operations, Arctic convoys had three times the number of anti-submarine escorts than comparable Atlantic convoys. The loss of Trinidad concentrated minds in the British government and Admiralty about the feasibility of convoys during the summer months. With the loss of HMS Fiji during the Battle of Crete in 1941, it was clear that even fast, manoeuvrable and well-armed warships were doomed in waters where the Germans had air supremacy.

==== Soviet ====
Josef Stalin was influenced by reports from Admiral Arseny Golovko and the Soviet Naval Command that inflated the achievements of the Navy in the far north, Golovko claiming that in the first year of the war, 135 ships of 583,000 GRT had been sunk and 412 aircraft shot down. The real figures were 28 ships of around 40,000 GRT; two U-boats being sunk before the end of the war, of 44 U-boats sunk in the Arctic, 38 were due to the British. About ten per cent of the claim for aircraft was realistic, Luftflotte V not having anything like that many aircraft until mid-1942. On 5 May, Rear-Admiral Geoffrey Miles, the leader of the British Military Mission to Russia, reported that Soviet naval personnel were young, disciplined and determined fighters but had no naval tradition and a top-down command structure that stifled initiative and sneered at advice from Allied navies. During operations spectaculars were preferred to useful sailing, convoy escort being looked down on. Seamanship and navigation were poor and naval weapons were only effective in good weather. Ships spent too much time in harbour and destroyers neglected to refuel on return to base, readiness being a matter of little interest.

== Allied order of battle ==
=== Merchant ships ===
Ships convoyed
Name	Year	Flag	GRT	Notes
Alcoa Cadet	1919	United States	4,823	Lost in N. Russia after arrival
Alcoa Rambler	1919	United States	5,500	At Reykjavik 15–26 April
Bayou Chico	1920	United States	5,401	
Botavon	1912	Merchant Navy	5,848	Convoy Commodore H. J. Anchor; torpedo hit, scuttled 3 May, 21† 52 surv
Cape Corso	1929	Merchant Navy	3,807	2 May, sunk, torpedo-bomber, 72°03′N, 19°46′E, 50† 6 surv
Cape Race	1930	Merchant Navy	3,807	Vice-convoy Commodore (ship captain) at Reykjavik 15–26 April
Capira	1920	Panama	5,625	
Deer Lodge	1919	United States	6,187	At Reykjavik 16–26 April
Empire Bard	1942	Merchant Navy	3,114	Joined from Reykjavik. Heavy-lift crane ship N. Russia
Empire Morn	1941	Merchant Navy	7,117	CAM ship at Reykjavik 16–26 April
Expositor	1919	United States	4,959	Reykjavik 15–26 April
Francis Scott Key	1941	United States	7,191	
Hegira	1919	United States	7,588	
Jutland	1928	Merchant Navy	6,153	2 May, torpedo, I./KG26, 73°02′N,19°46′E, sunk, U-251 3 May, 1† 62 surv.
Krassin	1917	Soviet Union	4,902	Icebreaker on passage
Lancaster	1918	United States	7,516	
Montcalm	1904	Merchant Navy	1,432	Icebreaker on passage
Mormacrey	1919	United States	5,946	
Mormacrio	1919	United States	5,940	
Paul Luckenbach	1913	United States	6,606	
Seattle Spirit	1919	United States	5,627	
Southgate	1926	Merchant Navy	4,862	At Reykjavik 16–26 April
Texas	1919	United States	5,638	
Topa Topa	1920	United States	5,356	
Zebulon B Vance	1942	United States	7,177	

=== Fuelling force ===
Convoy escorts
Name	Flag	Type	Notes
HMS Ledbury	Royal Navy	Hunt-class destroyer	26 April – 27 May, det. Gray Ranger, Lerwick 8 May
RFA Gray Ranger	Royal Navy	Ranger-class tanker	6,700 GRT, det. arr. Lerwick 8 May, with Ledbury

=== Escort forces ===
Convoy escorts
Name	Flag	Type	Notes
Iceland local escorts
HMT Cape Palliser	Royal Navy	ASW Trawler	26 April – 5 May
HMS Chiltern	Royal Navy	ASW Trawler	26 April – 5 May
HMT Northern Pride	Royal Navy	ASW Trawler	26 Apr – 5 May
HMT Vizalma	Royal Navy	ASW Trawler	26 April – 5 May
Oceanic escorts
HMS London	Royal Navy	County-class cruiser	30 April – 1 May
HMS Nigeria	Royal Navy	Fiji-class cruiser	28 April – 2 May
HMS Ulster Queen	Royal Navy	Auxiliary AA Cruiser	28 April – 5 May
HMS Somali	Royal Navy	Tribal-class destroyer	28 April – 5 May
HMS Boadicea	Royal Navy	B-class destroyer	28 April – 5 May
HMS Matchless	Royal Navy	M-class destroyer	28 April – 5 May
HNoMS St. Albans	Royal Norwegian Navy	Wickes-class destroyer	28 April – 5 May
HMS Venomous	Royal Navy	Modified W-class destroyer	28 April – 5 May
HMS Badsworth	Royal Navy	Hunt-class destroyer	28 April – 27 May
HMS Middleton	Royal Navy	Hunt-class destroyer	28 April – 4 May
HMS Bramble	Royal Navy	Halcyon-class minesweeper	26 April – 5 May
HMS Leda	Royal Navy	Halcyon-class minesweeper	26 April – 5 May
HMS Seagull	Royal Navy	Halcyon-class minesweeper	26 April – 5 May
Home fleet (heavy cover)
HMS Victorious	Royal Navy	Illustrious-class aircraft carrier	28 April – 5 May
HMS Duke of York	Royal Navy	King George V-class battleship	2–5 May
HMS King George V	Royal Navy	King George V-class battleship	28 April – 2 May, 1 May, Rammed Punjabi, damaged
USS Washington	United States	North Carolina-class battleship	28 April – 6 May
USS Tuscaloosa	United States	New Orleans-class cruiser	28 April – 6 May
USS Wichita	United States	Heavy cruiser	28 April – 6 May
HMS Kenya	Royal Navy	Fiji-class cruiser	28 April – 5 May
HMS Punjabi	Royal Navy	Tribal-class destroyer	29 April – 1 May, sunk, KG V, 66°00′N, 08°00′W 1†
USS Wilson	United States	Benham-class destroyer	28 April – 6 May
USS Madison	United States	Benson-class destroyer	28 April – 6 May
HMS Escapade	Royal Navy	E-class destroyer	2–5 May
HMS Faulknor	Royal Navy	F-class destroyers	2–5 May
USS Plunkett	United States	Gleaves-class destroyer	28 April – 6 May
HMS Inglefield	Royal Navy	I-class destroyer	28 April – 5 May
HMS Marne	Royal Navy	M-class destroyer	29 April – 5 May
HMS Martin	Royal Navy	M-class destroyer	29 April – 5 May
HMS Oribi	Royal Navy	O-class destroyer	29 April – 5 May
USS Wainwright	United States	Sims-class destroyer	28 April – 6 May
HMS Belvoir	Royal Navy	Hunt-class destroyer	28 April
HMS Hursley	Royal Navy	Hunt-class destroyer	28 April
HMS Lamerton	Royal Navy	Hunt-class destroyer	28 April – 4 May
British submarine patrols
ORP Jastrząb	Polish Navy	S-class submarine	2 May, sunk by St. Albans, Seagull, 5† 6 injured
Minerve	Free French Naval Forces	Minerve-class submarine	1–5 May
HMS Sturgeon	Royal Navy	S-class submarine	28 April – 1 May with convoy, then covering patrol
HMS Unison	Royal Navy	U-class submarine	1–5 May
HNoMS Uredd	Royal Norwegian Navy	U-class submarine	1–5 May
Soviet submarine patrols
D-3	Soviet Navy	Dekabrist-class submarine	
K-2	Soviet Navy	Soviet K-class submarine	
K-22	Soviet Navy	Soviet K-class submarine	
K-23	Soviet Navy	Soviet K-class submarine	

== German order of battle ==
=== Kriegsmarine ===
U-boats
Name	Flag	Class	Notes
U-88	Kriegsmarine	Type VIIC submarine	2 May, rescued 57 survivors of Hermann Schoemann
U-251	Kriegsmarine	Type VIIC submarine	Finished off Jutland, 3 May
U-405	Kriegsmarine	Type VIIC submarine	
U-436	Kriegsmarine	Type VIIC submarine	
U-456	Kriegsmarine	Type VIIC submarine	
U-589	Kriegsmarine	Type VIIC submarine	
U-703	Kriegsmarine	Type VIIC submarine	

=== Luftflotte 5 ===
Anti-shipping aircraft
Unit	Flag	Type	Notes
I./Kampfgeschwader 26	Luftwaffe	Heinkel He 111 H6	Torpedo-bomber, 2 × LT F5b torpedoes each
Kampfgeschwader 30	Luftwaffe	Junkers Ju 88	Bomber/dive-bomber

== See also ==
- List of shipwrecks in May 1942

== Bibliography ==
- Boog, H.; Rahn, W.; Stumpf, R.; Wegner, B. (2001). The Global War: Widening of the Conflict into a World War and the Shift of the Initiative 1941–1943. Germany in the Second World War. Vol. VI. Translated by Osers, E.; Brownjohn, J.; Crampton, P.; Willmot, L. (Eng trans. Oxford University Press, London ed.). Potsdam: Militärgeschichtliches Forschungsamt (Research Institute for Military History). ISBN 0-19-822888-0.
  - Rahn, W. "Part III, the War at Sea in the Atlantic and in the Arctic Ocean. III. The Conduct of the War in the Atlantic and the Coastal Area (b) The Third Phase, April–December 1941: The Extension of the Areas of Operations". In Boog et al. (2001).
- Boyd, Andrew (2024). Arms for Russia & the Naval War in the Arctic 1941–1945. Barnsley: Seaforth (Pen & Sword). ISBN 978-1-3990-3886-7.
- British Vessels lost at Sea 1939–45 (2nd facs. repr. Patrick Stephens, Cambridge ed.). London: HMSO. 1976 [1947]. ISBN 978-0-85-059267-2. original titles, Ships of the Royal Navy: Statement of Losses during the Second World War and British Merchant Vessels lost of Damaged by enemy Action during Second World War
- Brown, David (1995) [1990]. Warship Losses of World War Two (2nd rev. ed.). London: Arms and Armour Press. ISBN 1-85409-278-2.
- Budiansky, S. (2000). Battle of Wits: The Complete Story of Codebreaking in World War II. New York: The Free Press (Simon & Schuster). ISBN 0-684-85932-7 – via Archive Foundation.
- Butler, J. R. M. (1964). Grand Strategy: June 1941 – August 1942 (Part II). History of the Second World War, United Kingdom Military Series. Vol. III. London: HMSO. OCLC 504770038.
- Claasen, A. R. A. (2001). Hitler's Northern War: The Luftwaffe's Ill-fated Campaign, 1940–1945. Lawrence, KS: University Press of Kansas. ISBN 0-7006-1050-2.
- Edgerton, D. (2011). Britain's War Machine: Weapons, Resources and Experts in the Second World War. London: Allen Lane. ISBN 978-0-7139-9918-1.
- Hancock, W. K.; Gowing, M. M. (1949). Hancock, W. K. (ed.). British War Economy. History of the Second World War, United Kingdom Civil Series. London: HMSO. OCLC 630191560.
- Hinsley, F. H. (1981). British Intelligence in the Second World War: Its Influence on Strategy and Operations. History of the Second World War, United Kingdom Military Series. Vol. II. London: HMSO. ISBN 978-0-521-24290-5.
- Hinsley, F. H. (1994) [1993]. British Intelligence in the Second World War: Its Influence on Strategy and Operations. History of the Second World War, United Kingdom Military Series (2nd rev. abr. ed.). London: HMSO. ISBN 978-0-11-630961-7.
- Howard, M. (1972). Grand Strategy: August 1942 – September 1943. History of the Second World War United Kingdom Military Series. Vol. IV. London: HMSO. ISBN 978-0-11-630075-1 – via Archive Foundation.
- Jordan, Roger W. (2006) [1999]. The World's Merchant Fleets 1939: The Particulars and Wartime Fates of 6,000 Ships (2nd ed.). London: Chatham/Lionel Leventhal. ISBN 978-1-86176-293-1.
- Kahn, D. (1973) [1967]. The Codebreakers: The Story of Secret Writing (10th abr. Signet, Chicago ed.). New York: Macmillan. LCCN 63-16109. OCLC 78083316.
- Macintyre, Donald (1971). The Naval War Against Hitler. New York: Charles Scribner's Sons. ISBN 978-0-684-12375-2.
- Mitchell, W. H.; Sawyer, L. A. (1990) [1965]. The Empire Ships: A Record of British-built and acquired Merchant Ships during the Second World War (2nd ed.). London (New York, Hamburg, Hong Kong): Lloyd's of London Press. ISBN 1-85044-275-4.
- Rohwer, Jürgen; Hümmelchen, Gerhard (2005) [1972]. Chronology of the War at Sea, 1939–1945: The Naval History of World War Two (3rd rev. ed.). London: Chatham Publishing. ISBN 1-86176-257-7.
- Roskill, S. W. (1962) [1956]. The Period of Balance. History of the Second World War: The War at Sea 1939–1945. Vol. II (3rd impr. ed.). London: HMSO. OCLC 174453986 – via Hyperwar.
- Ruegg, Bob; Hague, Arnold (1993) [1992]. Convoys to Russia (2nd rev. exp. pbk. ed.). Kendal: World Ship Society. ISBN 978-0-905617-66-4.
- Sharpe, Peter (1998). U-Boat Fact File: Detailed Service Histories of the Submarines Operated by the Kriegsmarine 1935–1945. Leicester: Midland Publishing. ISBN 978-1-85-780072-2.
- Woodman, Richard (1994). Arctic Convoys 1941–1945 (hbk. ed.). London: John Murray. ISBN 0-7195-5079-3.
- Woodman, Richard (2004) [1994]. Arctic Convoys 1941–1945. London: John Murray. ISBN 978-0-7195-5752-1.
