= ORP Dzik (P52) =

Coordinates: 39°37′N 25°43′E

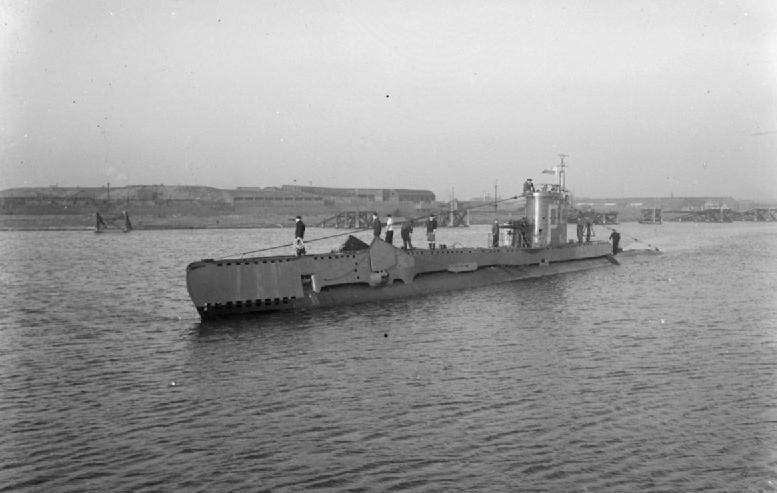

History

United Kingdom
- Name: HMS P52
- Builder: Vickers Armstrong, Barrow-in-Furness
- Laid down: 30 December 1941
- Launched: 11 October 1942
- Fate: Transferred to Polish Navy; Scrapped April 1958

Poland
- Name: ORP Dzik
- Commissioned: 16 December 1942
- Decommissioned: 25 July 1947
- Fate: Returned to Royal Navy, transferred to Danish Navy July 1947

Denmark
- Name: HDMS U 1
- In service: July 1947
- Out of service: 1957
- Renamed: HDMS Springeren in 1950
- Fate: Returned to UK 1957

General characteristics
- Class & type: U-class submarine
- Displacement: Surfaced - 540 tons standard, 630 tons full load; Submerged - 730 tons
- Length: 58.22 m (191 ft)
- Beam: 4.90 m (16 ft 1 in)
- Draught: 4.62 m (15 ft 2 in)
- Propulsion: 2 shaft diesel-electric; 2 Paxman Ricardo diesel generators + electric motors; 615 / 825 hp
- Speed: 11.25 knots max surfaced; 10 knots (20 km/h) max submerged
- Range: 4,300 nautical miles (8,000 km) at 11.5 knots; 5,203 nautical miles (9,636 km) at 8.5 knots submerged
- Complement: 37
- Armament: 4 bow internal 21 inch (533 mm) torpedo tubes - 8 - 10 torpedoes; 1 - 3-inch (76 mm) gun

ORP Dzik (Boar) was a U-class submarine built by Vickers-Armstrong at Barrow-in-Furness. She was laid down on 30 December 1941 as P-52 for the Royal Navy but was transferred to the Polish Navy during construction. Launched on 11 November 1942, ORP Dzik was commissioned into the Polish Navy on 12 December 1942. Her name meant "Wild Boar" in Polish.

24 May 1943 Near Cape Spartivento, ORP Dzik fired a 4-torpedo salvo and damaged the Italian oil tanker Carnaro (8357 Gross Register Tonnage). After the attack, two Italian corvettes dropped over 60 depth charges.

21 Sep 1943 ORP Dzik fired torpedoes in Bastia harbour, Corsica, France and sank the German tanker Nikolaus (6397, former Greek Nikolaou Ourania) and the German tug Kraft (333 Gross Register Tonnage).

8 Jan 1944 ORP Dzik sank the Greek sailing vessel Eleni (200 Gross Register Tonnage) with gunfire off Lesbos Island, Greece in position 39.37N, 25.43E.

The Jolly Roger flag flown by ORP "Dzik". The strips indicate sunk enemy ships.

ORP Dzik destroyed or damaged 18 surface ships both German and Italian with a total tonnage of 45,080 tons. She participated in Operation Husky, the Allied invasion of Sicily, and also engaged enemy surface ships with her 76 mm cannon three times and the crew boarded two enemy ships. The ORP Dzik earned the Jolly Roger.

In July 1946, the Polish Navy decommissioned her and returned her to the Royal Navy.

In 1947, the ship was transferred to the Royal Danish Navy. She sailed as HDMS U-1 and was later renamed to HDMS Springeren. She was returned to the Royal Navy in April 1958 and scrapped.

== Commanding officers ==
- 28 August 1942 - November 1944: Capt. Bolesław Romanowski
- November 1944 - 31 December 1944: Lt. Tadeusz Noworol
- 1 January 1945 – 25 August 1946: Capt. Andrzej Kłopotowski
