= ORP Jastrząb =

Former S-Class submarine of the US Navy

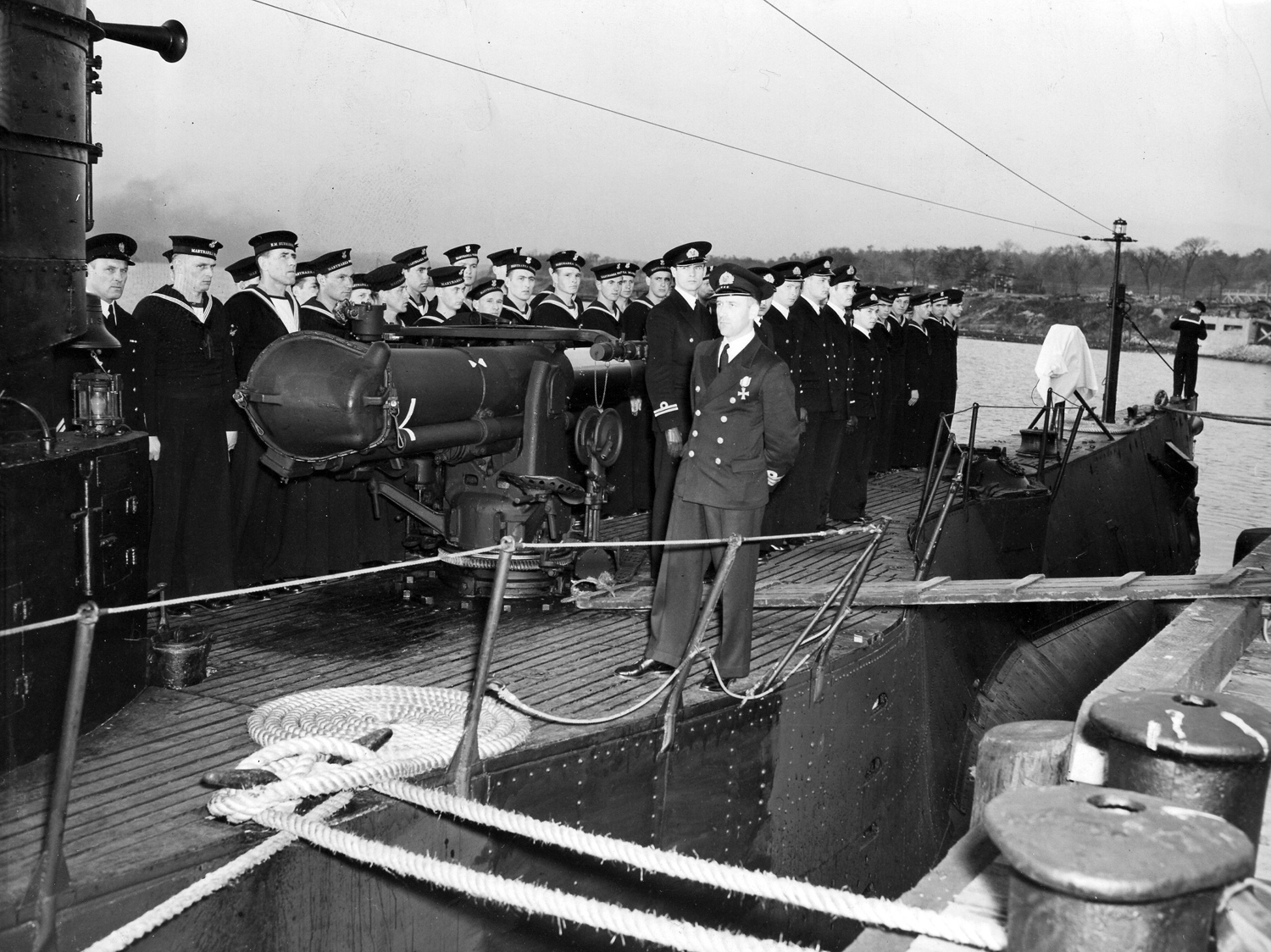
- The ceremony to rename the US S-class submarine as Polish submarine ORP Jastrząb. Lt.Cmdr. Boleslaw Romanowski waits for officials in front of the crew.

History

Poland
- Name: Jastrząb
- Namesake: Hawk
- Builder: Fore River Shipyard, Quincy, Massachusetts
- Laid down: 26 October 1918
- Launched: 29 May 1922
- Acquired: On loan from the Royal Navy
- Commissioned: 4 November 1941
- Fate: Sunk by friendly fire, 2 May 1942

General characteristics
- Class & type: S-class submarine
- Displacement: 854 long tons (868 t) surfaced; 1,062 long tons (1,079 t) submerged
- Length: 219 ft 3 in (66.83 m)
- Beam: 20 ft 8 in (6.30 m)
- Draft: 15 ft 11 in (4.85 m)
- Speed: 14.5 knots (26.9 km/h; 16.7 mph) surfaced; 11 kn (20 km/h; 13 mph) submerged
- Complement: 42 officers and men
- Armament: 1 × 4 in (102 mm) deck gun; 4 × 21 inch (533 mm) torpedo tubes

ORP Jastrząb (Note: ORP stands for Okręt Rzeczypospolitej Polskiej) ("Hawk") was a former S-class submarine, originally of the United States Navy, in Polish service between 1941 and 1942, when she was lost to friendly fire.

== Ship history ==
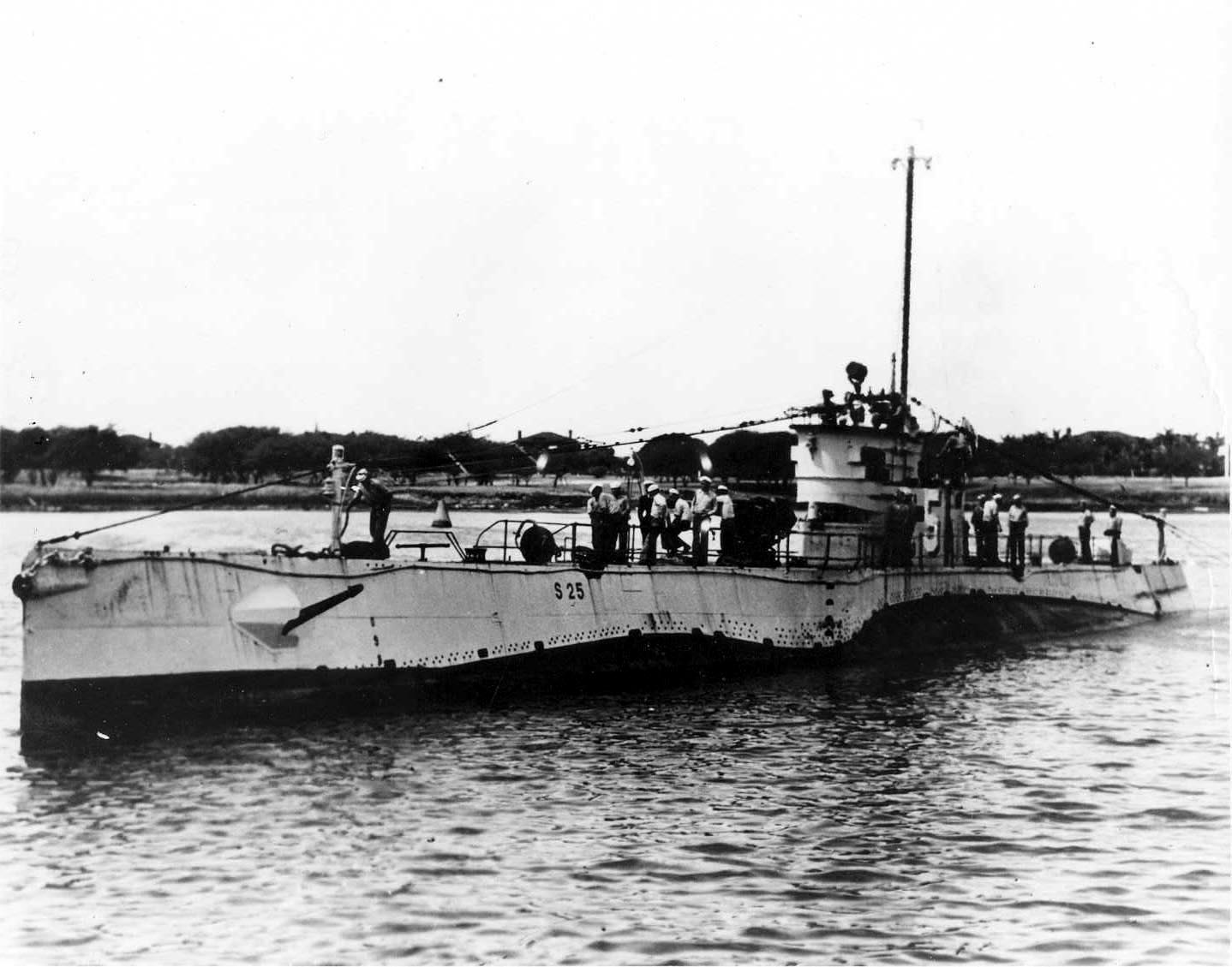
USS S-25 about 1923/1924

She was laid down in October 1918 as USS S-25, and launched in 1922. In 1940 she was set aside as a training vessel, and then earmarked for transfer to the Royal Navy under Lend-Lease.

She was decommissioned from the U.S. Navy on 4 November 1941, and simultaneously transferred to the Royal Navy as HMS P551; shortly thereafter she was loaned to the exiled Polish government, and entered service with the Polish Navy under Lieutenant Commander Bolesław Romanowski, due to a lack of trained submarine crews in the Royal Navy at the time.

Jastrząb entered the history of the Polish Navy as its only submarine ever to cross the Atlantic Ocean from the West to the East, as she came from the US to Europe.

During the passage of convoy PQ-15 to Murmansk, Jastrząb on 2 May 1942 was mistakenly engaged by the destroyer HNoMS St. Albans and the minesweeper HMS Seagull. She was attacked with depth charges and made to surface, there she was strafed with the loss of five crew (including the British liaison officer) and six injured, including the commander. The ship was badly damaged and had to be scuttled, near 71°30′N 12°32′E.

The incident is a matter of some controversy. One source states Jastrząb was escorting PQ 15, i.e. travelling with the convoy. Others however state she was covering PQ 15's passage by patrolling the Norwegian coast against a sortie by German capital ships, one of five submarines so assigned. These sources state Jastrząb was out of position; Pertek however states that it was the convoy which was out of position, and other sources confirm the convoy had altered course to avoid ice. The position of the incident, 200 miles from the Norwegian coast is inconsistent with a mission to patrol that coast, typically no more than 10 to 20 miles out.

Pertek also (after Romanowski's testimony) states Jastrząb was fired upon despite showing yellow recognition smoke candles; however other sources do not confirm this. Finally Pertek states the commanders of St Albans and Seagull were found guilty at a court martial over the incident; Kemp states that the court of enquiry (a normal procedure following the loss of a ship, though not of friendly fire cases) found no blame could be attributed to either commander. It is not possible to reconcile these accounts.

On 5 May 1942, the convoy reached Murmansk, where the Polish crew remained resting for two and a half months, then returned to Great Britain on board the Polish destroyer ORP Garland.

== See also ==
- ORP Orzeł, another Polish submarine lost during World War II
