= Beauvais (disambiguation) =

Beauvais is a city in Picardy, France.

Beauvais may also refer to:

- AS Beauvais Oise, French football club
- Arrondissement of Beauvais, arrondissement of France
- Beauvais Cathedral
- Beauvais (surname)
- Beauvais Lake (Alberta), lake in Alberta, Canada
- Beauvais-sur-Matha, Charente-Maritime department, Frane
- Beauvais-sur-Tescou, Tarn department, France
- Beauvais Township, Ste. Genevieve County, Missouri

== See also ==
- Beauvais tapestry, French tapestry
