= Beauvais (surname) =

Beauvais is a French surname. Notable people with the surname include:

- Armand Beauvais (1783–1843), American politician
- Bernadette Beauvais (born 1949), French politician
- Denis Beauvais (born 1962), Canadian artist
- Garcelle Beauvais (born 1966), Haitian actress and model
- Laurent Beauvais (born 1952), French politician
- René Beauvais (1795–1837), Canadian carpenter and woodcarver
- Robert Beauvais (1911–1982), French writer and journalist
- Tammy Beauvais, Indigenous Canadian fashion designer
- William Beauvais (born 1956), Canadian classical guitarist and composer
