= Louis Quévillon =

Canadian tradesman and contractor

- Born: October 14, 1749
- Died: March 9, 1823 (aged 73)
- Known for: Sculptor wood-carving gilding, silvering, and painting
- Movement: NeoClassical

Louis Quévillon (October 14, 1749 – March 9, 1823) was a tradesman and contractor.

== Biography ==
Quévillon was active in the wood carving and contracting of many religious architectural projects. The Montreal region was largely where he was active and he dominated this market for over 20 years. His large workshop often had 15 or more apprentices and master craftsmen who work on clearly defined tasks. The work included wood-carving gilding, silvering, and painting for the churches. The work was both new and restorative and reflected an ability to reproduce motifs and forms in an inexpensive and aesthetically pleasing manner. Collaborations with other master carvers were part of the production method. Over the years he partnered or collaborated with Amable Charron, Joseph Pépin, Urbain Desrochers and René Beauvais.

In his workshop Louis Quévillon set the standards for religious wood-carving in the 19th century.
