= Belvoir (Crownsville, Maryland) =

Historic house in Maryland

- U.S. National Register of Historic Places
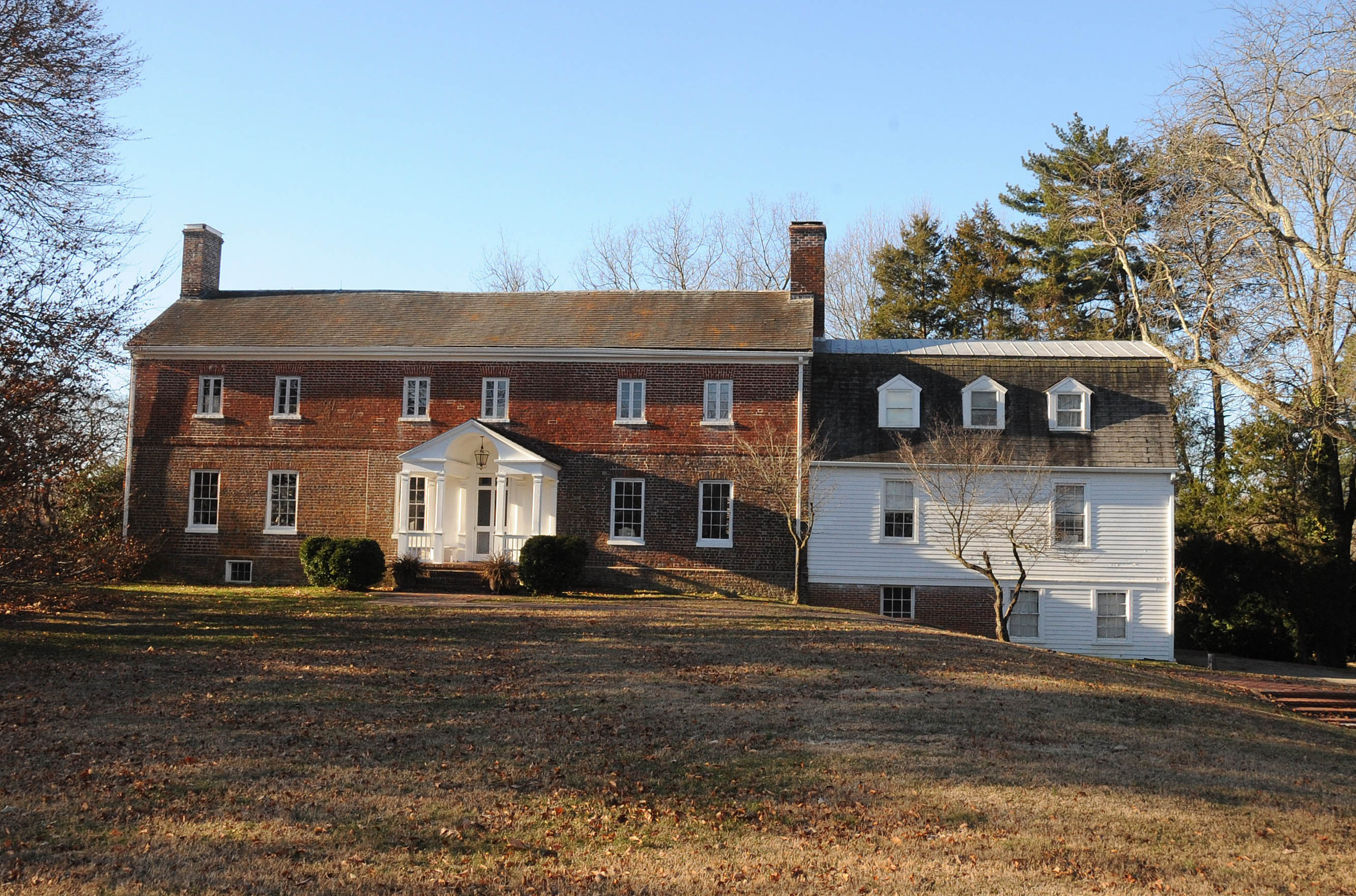

- Location within Maryland Location within the United States
- Nearest city: Crownsville, Maryland
- Coordinates: 39°1′25″N 76°34′57″W
- NRHP reference No.: 71000366
- Added to NRHP: November 19, 1971

Belvoir is a historic house at Crownsville, Anne Arundel County, Maryland. It is a two-story, T-shaped building, constructed of brick, stone, and wood. The home is a product of building evolution spanning the 18th, 19th, and 20th centuries. The earliest portion was probably built about 1736, but could date to the 17th century. It was the home of the grandmother of Francis Scott Key, who composed the United States' national anthem, Star Spangled Banner. Key visited in the summer in 1789.

Archaeological research is being performed on the plantation site to document the lives of slaves during the 18th and 19th centuries. A foundation from the slave quarters made of stone from the last quarter of the 18th century was found, with many artifacts from the period when slaves lived in the building.

It was listed on the National Register of Historic Places in 1971.
