= René Beauvais =

Canadian carpenter and master woodcarver

René Beauvais (commonly known as René Saint-James) (October 8, 1795 – September 4, 1837) was a carpenter and master woodcarver from Lower Canada.

Little is known about Beauvais's apprenticeship but it was most likely with Louis Quévillon or possibly one of his associates. We do know that he became a master woodcarver by 1812 and did extensive work in the church at Sainte-Thérèse-de-Blainville which included some carpentry, woodcarving, and gilding as well as the structure housing the altar, rood-loft, cornice, and vaulting of this building.

By 1815, Beauvais was in partnership with Quévillon and two other partners working on many important projects. Because of the collaborative nature of the craft at the time, it is difficult to individually identify his own work but he had an important influence on woodcarving in the Montreal region. He is sometimes referred to as an architect in connection with his extensive work with the churches of the area.
