= Marie-Louise de Beauvoir =

Belgian feminist and educator

Marie-Louise de Beauvoir née Cousin (17 August 1776, in Pas-de-Calais – 1855), was a Belgian pioneer educator. She was the founder of the first secular school for girls in Belgium, the «Maison d’éducation de demoiselles» in Liège, which was to be regarded as the perhaps most fashionable girls school in the country, and was its manager in 1816–1852. One of her students was the pioneer educator Léonie de Waha, who founded a college for girls, l'école supérieure de demoiselles .

Born in France, she was married to the French politician Louis-Etienne Beffroy de Beauvoir, and followed him to Liège, Belgium, when he was exiled during the Bourbon Restoration for having voted for the execution of Louis XVI during the French Revolution.
