= USS Thomas (DD-182) =

Wickes-class destroyer

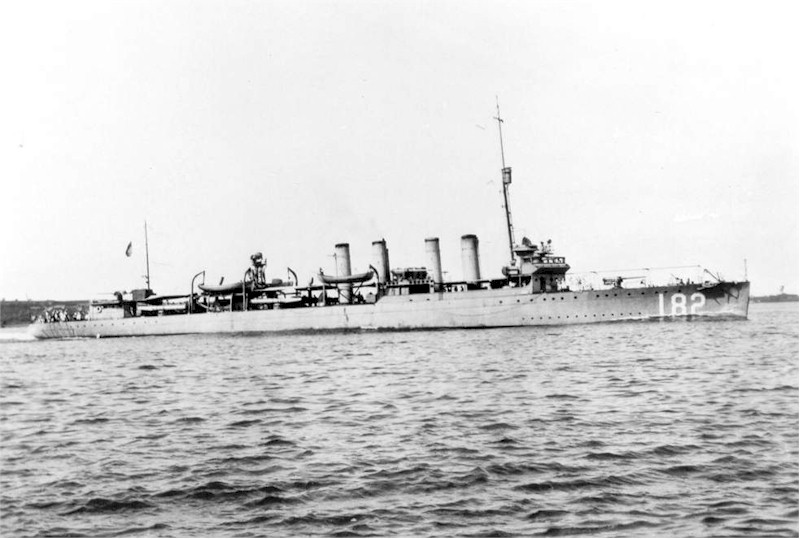
- USS Thomas (DD-182)

History

United States
- Name: USS Thomas
- Namesake: Clarence Crase Thomas
- Builder: Newport News Shipbuilding and Dry Dock Company
- Laid down: 23 March 1918
- Launched: 4 July 1918
- Commissioned: 25 April 1919
- Decommissioned: 30 June 1922
- Recommissioned: 17 June 1940
- Decommissioned: 23 September 1940
- Stricken: 8 January 1941
- Identification: DD-182
- Fate: Transferred to United Kingdom, 23 September 1940

United Kingdom
- Name: HMS St Albans
- Namesake: St Albans
- Commissioned: 23 September 1940
- Fate: Transferred to Royal Norwegian Navy in April 1941

Norway
- Name: HNoMS St Albans
- Commissioned: 14 April 1941
- Fate: Returned to United Kingdom, 4 May 1944

Soviet Union
- Name: Dostoyny (Worthy)
- Acquired: 16 July 1944
- Fate: Transferred to UK for scrapping, 28 February 1949

General characteristics
- Class & type: Wickes-class destroyer
- Displacement: 1,213 tons
- Length: 314 ft 4 1/2 in (95.822 m)
- Beam: 31 ft 8 in (9.65 m)
- Draft: 9 ft 4 in (2.84 m)
- Speed: 35 knots (65 km/h)
- Complement: 101 officers and enlisted
- Armament: Initial; 4 × 4 in (102 mm)/50 guns; 1 x 3 in (76 mm)/23 gun; 12 x 21 inch (533 mm) torpedo tubes; 1941–44; 3 × 4 in (102 mm) guns; 2 x 3 in (76 mm) guns; 4 DC throwers

The first USS Thomas (DD–182) was a Wickes-class destroyer of the United States Navy that entered service just after World War I.

She was transferred to the Royal Navy becoming the Town-class destroyer, HMS St Albans (I15) and was used for convoy escort work.

In April 1941 St Albans was transferred to the exiled Royal Norwegian Navy retaining her name as HNoMS St Albans

In mid-1944, St Albans was transferred to the Soviet Navy as Dostoyny.

== Service history ==
=== As USS Thomas ===
Named after Clarence Crase Thomas, she was laid down on 23 March 1918 by the Newport News Shipbuilding and Dry Dock Company; Virginia. It was launched on 4 July 1918; sponsored by Mrs. Evelyn M. Thomas, widow of the namesake; and commissioned on 25 April 1919.

Thomas operated off the east coast on training cruises and exercises until decommissioned at Philadelphia on 30 June 1922. In the Navy-wide assignment of alphanumeric hull numbers on 17 July 1920 she was as classified as DD-182. After leaving service she lay in reserve in the Philadelphia Navy Yard's back channel for the next 18 years.

Recommissioned on 17 June 1940 – as the United States Navy expanded to meet the demands imposed by Neutrality Patrols off American coastlines – Thomas was assigned to Destroyer Division 79 of the Atlantic Squadron and operated briefly in training and exercises off the eastern seaboard.

The "destroyer-for-bases" agreement was made between the UK and the US at the start of September 1940 - under it 50 WWI-era destroyers were transferred to the British in exchange for eases on strategic base sites in the western hemisphere.

She arrived at Halifax, Nova Scotia, on 18 September 1940 and officially turned over to the Royal Navy on 23 September 1940. Her name was subsequently struck from the United States Navy list on 8 January 1941.

=== As HMS St Albans ===
Simultaneously renamed HMS St Albans (I15) and commissioned the same day for service in the Royal Navy, the destroyer sailed for the British Isles on 29 September. After calling at St. John's, Newfoundland, en route, she arrived at Belfast, Northern Ireland, on 9 October.

St Albans and three sister ships – HMS St Mary's, HMS Bath, and HMS Charlestown – were attached to the 1st Minelaying Squadron as permanent escort force. Operating off the west coast of Scotland, the destroyers participated in some of the earliest minelaying operations in the Denmark Strait which separates Iceland from Greenland.

Between these escort missions, St Albans escorted convoys. On 17 and 18 January 1941, the destroyer searched for survivors from SS Almeda Star, torpedoed by U-96 on 17 January. St Albans underwent repairs at Chatham in February to prepare for her transfer to the Royal Norwegian Navy-in-exile on 14 April.

=== As HNoMS St Albans ===
St Albans had no sooner entered service with the Norwegians than she collided with the minesweeping trawler HMS Alberic, sinking the trawler and sustaining enough damage herself to necessitate repairs in the dockyard.

When again ready for action, HNoMS St Albans joined the 7th Escort Group, operating out of Liverpool. On 12 June, she picked up the survivors from the sunken steamship SS Empire Dew – torpedoed that day by the German submarine U-48 – and brought them safely to Liverpool.

On 3 August 1941, while bound from Sierra Leone to the United Kingdom in the screen of convoy SL 81, St Albans joined the destroyer HMS Wanderer and the Flower-class corvette HMS Hydrangea in sinking U-401. During subsequent operations screening convoys in shipping lanes between West Africa and the British Isles, St Albans made a score of attacks on U-boats but did not achieve another kill.

During the following autumn, a heavy gale severely damaged St Albans while she was escorting convoy ON 22 on 8 October. Despite the high seas and strong winds, St Albans's Norwegian reached Reykjavík, Iceland safely. The destroyer's seaworthiness and the seamanship exhibited by her Norwegian crew elicited a warm commendatory signal from the Commander-in-Chief, Western Approaches (C-in-C WA). In this message of 12 October 1941, he also praised the destroyer's exemplary steaming performance during the previous three months.

St Albans, meanwhile, continued her escort duties with the 7th Escort Group into 1942. In March, she escorted the damaged aircraft carrier HMS Illustrious from Liverpool to the Clyde and, in the following month, helped to screen convoy PQ 15 as it carried materiel to northern Russia. During the operation, heavy German air and submarine attacks sank three Allied ships.

Due to an error in identification St Albans and the minesweeper HMS Seagull sank the Polish submarine ORP Jastrząb on 2 May. Five crewmen were killed. The court of Enquiry found that Jastrząb was 100 miles out of position, in an area where U-boats were expected to operate, and no blame could be attached to either commander. However this conclusion is disputed by other sources.

Later that month, St Albans joined the Liverpool Special Escort Division. Among the vessels escorted early in June was the Cunard-White Star liner RMS Queen Elizabeth, operating as troopship travelling to the Middle East via the Cape of Good Hope After refitting at Falmouth between July and October 1942, St Albans again operated with the Special Escort Division until the end of 1942. In January 1943, she served as a target vessel for training RAF Coastal Command aircraft.

Late in February, she got underway and steamed into the North Sea toward the Scandinavian coast to search for a Norwegian merchantman which was reportedly attempting to escape to sea from German-controlled waters. During this mission, the destroyer was attacked by German aircraft but emerged unharmed.

Shifted to the Western Local Escort Force soon thereafter, St Albans was based at Halifax and operated in convoy escort missions in the western Atlantic for the remainder of 1943. Departing Halifax four days after Christmas 1943, St Albans arrived in the Tyne on 10 January 1944, where she was soon laid up in reserve. St Albans was returned to the Royal Navy on 4 February 1944

=== As Dostoyny ===
On 16 July 1944, the British transferred St Albans to the Soviet Navy, who renamed her Dostoyny (rus. Достойный, "Worthy"). (Note: Alternatively transliterated "Dostojnyj") She was returned to the British on 28 February 1949 at Rosyth, Scotland. It was eventually broken up for scrap at Charlestown in April 1949.

== Battle honours ==
For service in World War II, St Albans was awarded the battle honours Atlantic 1941-43, English Channel 1942, Arctic 1942 and North Sea 1943

== Bibliography ==
- Destroyers for Great Britain: A History of 50 Town Class Ships Transferred From the United States to Great Britain in 1940 (Rev. and expanded ed.). Annapolis, Maryland: Naval Institute Press. 1988. ISBN 0-87021-782-8.
- Mason, Lt Cdr Geoffrey B (6 June 2011). "HMS, later Norwegian HNorMS ST ALBANS (I 15), also Russian DOSTOINY - ex-US Destroyer". Service Histories of Royal Navy Warships in World War 2. naval-history.net.
