= HMS Seagull (J85) =

Minesweeper of the Royal Navy

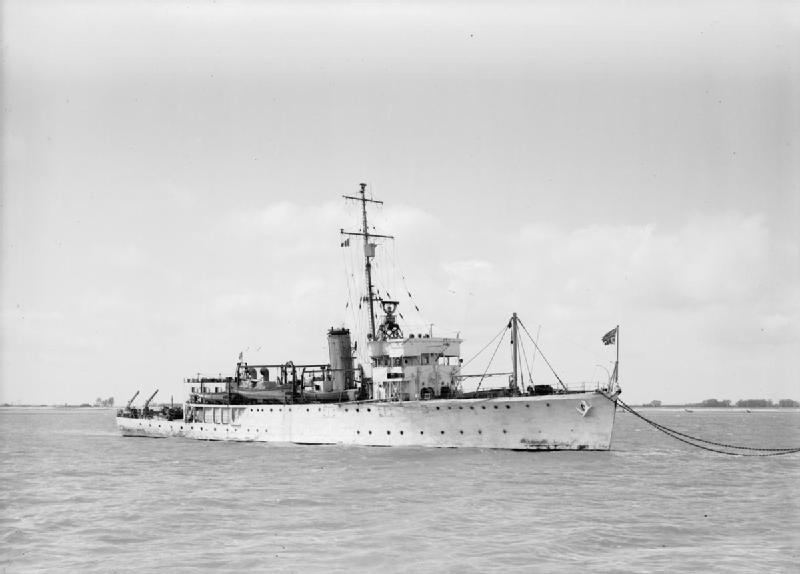
- Seagull in May 1946

History

United Kingdom
- Name: HMS Seagull
- Operator: Royal Navy
- Builder: HMNB Devonport
- Laid down: 15 February 1937
- Launched: 28 October 1937
- Commissioned: 30 May 1938
- Fate: Scrapped in May/July 1956.

General characteristics
- Class & type: Halcyon-class minesweeper
- Displacement: 815–835 long tons (828–848 t); 1,310–1,372 long tons (1,331–1,394 t), full load
- Length: 245 ft 3 in (74.75 m)
- Beam: 33 ft 6 in (10.21 m)
- Draught: 9 ft (2.7 m)
- Propulsion: Vertical triple-expansion, 2,000 ihp
- Speed: 17 kn (20 mph; 31 km/h)
- Range: 7,200 nmi (8,290 mi; 13,330 km) at 10 kn (12 mph; 19 km/h)
- Complement: 80
- Armament: 2 × QF 4 in Mk.V (L/45 102 mm) guns, single mounts HA Mk.III; 4 × QF 0.5-inch Mk.III (12.7 mm) Vickers machine guns, quad mount HA Mk.I; 8 × .303-inch (7.7 mm) Lewis machine guns

HMS Seagull was a Halcyon-class minesweeper, and the first all-welded Royal Navy ship, built entirely without rivets. The design was ahead of its time, using longitudinal framing and flush butt joints in the hull plating. This gave a substantial improvement in costs and build time, the comparison being the half-sister ship built using rivetted construction on another slipway in the same dockyard. She was designed by Rowland Baker, the influential naval architect who worked on many naval vessels used in World War 2 and into the cold war. She was completed on 30 March 1938.

She was adopted by the civil community of Christchurch, Hampshire after a successful Warship Week National Savings campaign in February 1942

During the Second World War she helped escort 21 Arctic convoys, and participated in Operation Neptune. She was also involved in the accidental sinking of the Polish submarine ORP Jastrząb, along with HNoMS St Albans, during the passage of Arctic Convoy PQ 15. Five crewmen were killed. A court of Enquiry found that Jastrząb was 100 nmi (190 km; 120 mi) out of position, in an area where U-boats were expected to operate, and no blame could be attached to either commander. Other sources maintain the convoy changed course and entered Jastrząb's patrol sector. Also that the Allied ships ignored identification marks, while on the surface and that Seagull's commander was later found guilty by the Admiralty. These accounts are not reconcilable.

In late 1945 she was converted in Rotterdam to a Survey Ship. Until 1950 she operated in home waters, after which she was paid off into the reserve. She became the naval drill ship at Leith in 1955 before being scrapped by Demmelweek and Redding in Plymouth in 1956.
