= Clarence Crase Thomas =

American naval officer (1886–1917)

- Born: December 26, 1886; Grass Valley, California
- Died: April 28, 1917
- Military career
- Allegiance: United States of America
- Branch: United States Navy
- Service years: 1904-1917
- Conflicts: World War I
- Awards: Navy Cross

Clarence Crase Thomas (December 26, 1886 – April 28, 1917) was an officer in the United States Navy during World War I. Thomas became the first U.S. naval officer to die in the war, after his ship was torpedoed by a German submarine. He was posthumously awarded the Navy Cross.

== Early life and career ==
Born in Grass Valley, California, Thomas was appointed midshipman on July 7, 1904 and graduated from the United States Naval Academy on June 5, 1908. After service in armored cruiser USS Maryland (ACR-8) and gunboat USS Yorktown (PG-1), he was commissioned ensign on June 29, 1910.

In the next few years, Thomas served on USS Denver (C-14), USS Cleveland (C-19), and USS West Virginia (ACR-5).

Appointed lieutenant (j.g.) on June 26, 1913, he was detached from West Virginia in the summer of 1914 to attend a post-graduate course in steam engineering at the Naval Academy. He attended Columbia University in late 1915 and, on June 24, 1916, reported on board USS Florida (BM-9) as her electrical officer.

== World War I ==
Thomas was commissioned lieutenant on January 8, 1917 and was placed in charge of the naval armed guard on the merchant steamship SS Vacuum in April. On the 28th, when a lookout reported sighting a German submarine, some 120 miles west of the Hebrides Islands, Lt. Thomas went to the ship's after gun. A few moments later, a torpedo from U-21 struck Vacuum, and exploded, throwing Thomas and the gun's crew into the water. The ship sank within two minutes. Picked up by a boat, Thomas soon died of cold and exposure.

He was the first United States naval officer to lose his life in the war with Germany and was posthumously awarded the Navy Cross "for distinguished service in the line of his profession as commander of the armed guard crew of the ... Vacuum."

Two ships were named USS Thomas for him.
