= HMS Belvoir =

Belvoir has been the name of two Royal Navy warships:

- HMS Belvoir (1917) was a Hunt-class minesweeper built by Ailsa Shipbuilding Co. Ltd in Troon, Scotland in 1917. She served under the command of Lt. R. B. Roberts RNR until 1919
- HMS Belvoir (L32) was a Hunt-class destroyer built by Cammell Laird & Co Ltd in Birkenhead in 1942. She served mainly in the Mediterranean, taking part in Operation Husky, the Salerno landings and landings in the South of France
