= HMS Lion (C34) =

1960 Tiger-class cruiser of the Royal Navy

- HMS Lion underway

History

United Kingdom
- Name: HMS Lion
- Ordered: 1942 Additional Naval Programme
- Builder: Scotts Shipbuilding and Engineering Company, Greenock; Swan Hunter and Wigham Richardson, Wallsend
- Laid down: 6 June 1942
- Launched: 2 September 1944
- Commissioned: 20 July 1960
- Decommissioned: December 1972
- Out of service: Used as a parts hulk for sister ships from 1973
- Fate: Sold for scrap 12 February 1975

General characteristics
- Class & type: Tiger-class light cruiser
- Displacement: 11,560 tons as built; 12,080 tons after conversion
- Length: 555.5 ft (169.3 m) overall; 538 ft (166 m) between perpendiculars
- Beam: 64 ft (20 m)
- Draught: 21 ft (6.4 m)
- Propulsion: Four Admiralty-type three drum boilers (400 psi); Four shaft Parsons steam turbines; 80,000 shp
- Speed: 31.5 knots (58 km/h)
- Range: 8,000 nautical miles (14,816 km) at 16 kn (30 km/h)
- Complement: 716
- Armament: Four × QF 6 inch Mark N5 guns (2 × 2); Six × QF 3-inch Mark N1 guns (3 × 2)

HMS Lion was a Tiger-class light cruiser of the British Royal Navy, originally ordered in 1942 as one of the Minotaur class and laid down that same year as Defence by Scotts Shipbuilding and Engineering Company at Greenock in Scotland on 6 June 1942.

Work was stopped and not begun again until the mid-1950s for completion as an air-defence cruiser pending the introduction of guided missile-equipped County-class destroyers into the navy. She was commissioned in 1960. All three Tigers were to be converted into helicopter carriers but Lion was placed into reserve in 1965 and served as a supply of spares for the other two until decommissioned in 1972 followed by selling for scrap in 1975.

== Design and construction ==
Partially complete, the ship was launched on 2 September 1944 by Lady Edelson, but work was suspended in 1946. The cruiser was further advanced than the two other Tigers and its completion as HMS Defence in 1947 was anticipated. New Mk 24 triple six-inch turrets for four Tiger-class ships were 75-80% complete. but the decision was made in 1954 to fit the more advanced fully automatic Mk 26 twin 6-inch turrets. Lion was fitted with one hydraulic and one electric powered turret in A and Y positions, The three Mk 24 turrets in A, B and Y would have given more reliable all angle surface cover against multiple targets (Note: The new turrets were slightly improved, 60 degree elevation for Dual Purpose, Remote Power Control, power rammed and with a powered breech, versions of the standard RN triple 6-inch fitted, from Belfast in 1939 to Superb in 1945, with a rate of fire of 5-8 rpm.) Still named Defence, she was laid up at Gareloch in Scotland for eight years in dehumidified sealed state in the RN Reserve Fleet, while the other incomplete Tigers remained with their builders. By 1954 the condition of Defence "was not so good", but it was felt Defence, Blake, and Tiger could still be completed, with new armament in three years at a cost of 6 million pounds while construction of equivalent new cruisers would cost 12 million pounds and take 5 years. Construction of Defence and two other cruisers was resumed to a revised Tiger-class design. Defence was renamed Lion in 1957 and construction continued at the Swan Hunter and Wigham Richardson yards at Wallsend on the Tyne. Its final cost was 13 million pounds.

== Service history ==
She was finally commissioned in July 1960, having been rushed into service with some shortcuts in the engineering department, due to political pressure to get her to sea. Initial trials were disrupted by severe rotor, turbine and vibration problems and a further three months in Portsmouth dockyard were required before she became fully operational in February 1961.

Lion's first commission included a Mediterranean leg covering some 20,500 miles in 1961. In the latter part of that year she headed to South America and returned to Plymouth in 1962.

Lion recommissioned at Devonport for service in the Home Fleet and Far East on 31 July 1962 and sailed to the Mediterranean for work-up at the end of November. She reached the Far East in March 1963 and was present at the Malaya independence celebrations in September. She subsequently visited Australia before returning to the UK via the Suez Canal. In early 1964, Lion took part in major NATO and other national exercises; she then visited Spain and Portugal before returning to the UK.

In September 1964 Lion was present at the Maltese independence celebrations. Earlier that year she had been rammed under the Forth Road Bridge by the frigate Lowestoft. Emergency repairs were carried out in Rosyth dockyard before she sailed for Malta with only hours to spare. Early in 1965, Lion was present at the Gambian independence ceremony on Bathurst, now Banjul. Later that year, she was flagship of a small force for an official visit to Sweden. The ship was present at Portsmouth Navy Days in August 1965, before being decommissioned into the reserve at Devonport until 1972, when she was placed on the disposal list.

Plans to convert Lion along the lines of her sisters Tiger and Blake were rejected as too costly. On 15 May 1973, she arrived at Rosyth and was subsequently stripped of parts and equipment for use in Tiger and Blake. Lion was sold for breaking up on 12 February 1975 for £262,500. On 24 April 1975 she arrived at Inverkeithing where she was scrapped by ship breakers Thos. W. Ward. Some equipment from her was salvaged and sold to Peru for use in their former BritishFiji-class cruisers.
