= HMS Swiftsure (08) =

Minotaur-class cruiser

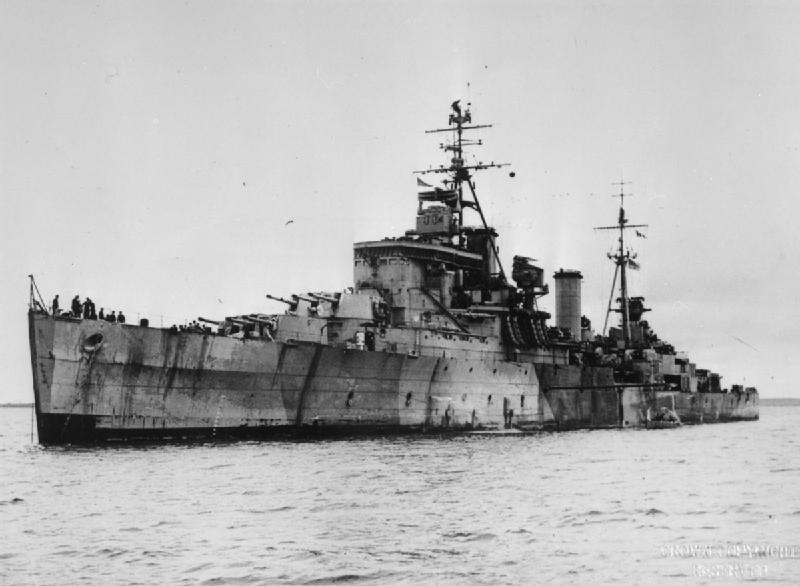

History

United Kingdom
- Name: Swiftsure
- Builder: Vickers Armstrong, Newcastle upon Tyne
- Laid down: 22 September 1941
- Launched: 4 February 1943
- Commissioned: 22 June 1944
- Decommissioned: 1958
- Identification: Pennant number: 08
- Fate: Scrapped, 1962

General characteristics
- Class & type: Minotaur-class light cruiser
- Displacement: 8,800 tons standard; 11,130 tons full
- Length: 555.5 ft (169.3 m)
- Beam: 63 ft (19 m)
- Draught: 17.25 ft (5.26 m)
- Propulsion: Four Admiralty-type three drum boilers; Four shaft Parsons steam turbines; 72,500 shp (54,100 kW)
- Speed: 31.5 kn (58.3 km/h; 36.2 mph)
- Range: 2,000 nmi (3,700 km; 2,300 mi) at 30 kn (56 km/h; 35 mph); 8,000 nmi (15,000 km; 9,200 mi) at 16 kn (30 km/h; 18 mph); 1,850 tons fuel oil
- Complement: 867
- Armament: 3 x triple BL 6 inch Mk XXIII naval guns; 5 x dual QF 4 inch Mark XVI guns HA; 4 x quad 2 pdr (40 mm) guns; 6 x single 40 mm AA cannons; 2 x triple 21 inch (533 mm) torpedo tubes.
- Armour: Belt 3.25–3.5 in (83–89 mm); Deck 2 in (51 mm); Turrets 1–2 in (25–51 mm); Bulkheads 1.5–2 in (38–51 mm)

HMS Swiftsure was one of three Minotaur-class light cruisers built for the Royal Navy during the Second World War. She was laid down by Vickers Armstrong at Newcastle upon Tyne on 22 September 1941, launched on 4 February 1943 by Lady Wake-Walker, and commissioned on 22 June 1944. She was the first of the new Minotaur class, a development of the later Colony-class cruisers, featuring increased beam and an additional fifth twin 4-inch turret.

Swiftsure was the last Royal Navy cruiser to be completed during the war and the first British cruiser to be designed with an operations room and modern radar systems. Her sensor displays and communications were arranged for improved operational efficiency. During her service in the Pacific in 1945, she was regarded as the most effective anti-aircraft cruiser in the fleet, and was the first Royal Navy cruiser equipped with the Type 274 lock-and-follow radar targeting system for her main armament.

== Service history ==
=== Second World War ===
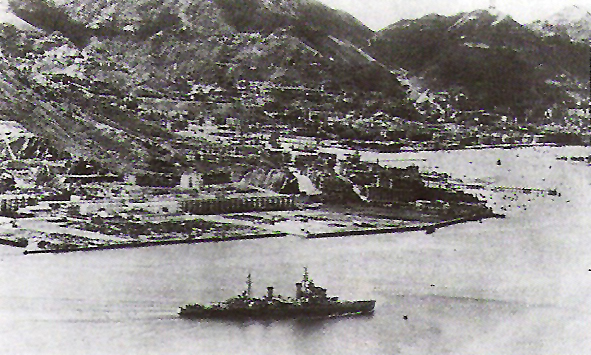
HMS Swiftsure, entering Victoria Harbour past North Point on 30 August 1945.

HMS Swiftsure joined the Home Fleet upon commissioning and, in 1944, was assigned to the Eastern Fleet. In November 1944, she became a unit of the newly formed British Pacific Fleet. While operating in the Pacific, she participated in the Okinawa campaign from March to May 1945, and in June took part in a the carrier raid on Truk. During this operation, the British Pacific Fleet was operating as part of Task Group 111.2, with the cruisers conducting shore bombardments.

On 30 August 1945, Swiftsure entered Hong Kong as part of this group and took part in the formal acceptance of the Japanese surrender. At that time, she was serving as the flagship of the British Pacific Cruiser Squadron and was selected by Admiral Sir Cecil Harcourt to hoist his flag for the surrender ceremony.

In October 1945 HMS Swiftsure and its crew were filmed by British journalist (Sunday Times, Sunday Chronicle, Daily Graphic) William Courtenay visiting the ruined cities of Sasebo, Nagasaki and Kagoshima. (see William Courtney Film Archive at IWM Film Collections)

=== Post-war service ===
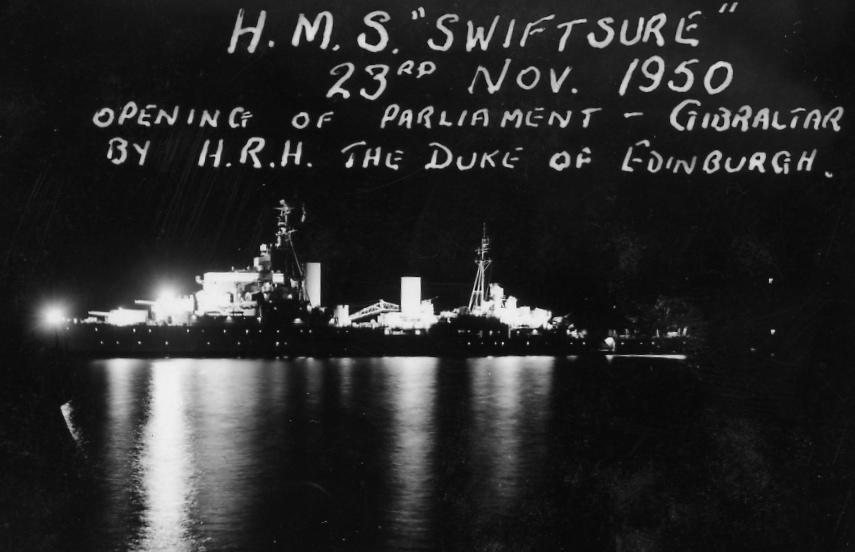
HMS Swiftsure at Opening of Parliament - Gibraltar. 23 November 1950 by H.R.H. The Duke of Edinburgh.

HMS Swiftsure served as the flagship of the 4th Cruiser Squadron in 1946, and in 1951 became the flagship of the 2nd Cruiser Squadron. (Note: Future Formula One world champion Graham Hill served aboard the ship as an engine room artificer around this time.) She was refitted to align with HMS Superb, receiving three 'Glasshouse' directors with Type 275 radar for the 4-inch guns, Type 960M long-range air warning radar, and a more powerful 40 mm light anti-aircraft armament mounted on "Boffin" and "Buster" mountings.

In 1953, she took part in the Fleet Review to celebrate the Coronation of Queen Elizabeth II. On 29 September 1953, she collided with the destroyer Diamond, causing a major fire in the bridge cable trunk, which housed vital electrical wiring for the bridge, operations room, foremast, and director control tower. The ship remained inactive until February 1957, when a major refit commenced at Chatham Dockyard, intended to bring her up to a standard comparable to the later Tiger class. Plans included the installation of six twin 40 mm L/70 Bofors mounts. (Note: The RN had planned to adopt AA guns smaller than 3 inch (76 mm) as soon as proximity fuses could be fitted to smaller shells as the higher rate of fire was more effective and the solid shell 40mm was ineffective at more than a mile range. Swiftsure would have retained her original triple 6-inch turrets.)

However, in August 1959, midway through the conversion—with a new bridge and lattice masts already installed—the refit was cancelled. According to official statements and reports to Parliament in 1962, the cost of refitting an increasingly obsolete vessel was no longer justifiable. Original estimates from 1956 had placed the refit cost at £4 million. Damage from the 1953 collision had not been fully assessed at the time and only became evident during the modernisation, contributing to delays and increased costs. (Note: Originally scheduled for completion in December 1959)

After spending over £1 million, with costs continuing to rise due to dockyard labour and material expenses, the refit was abandoned. A 1960 photograph taken at Chatham Dockyard shows Swiftsure with three turrets reinstalled and structural work nearing completion, indicating that the rebuilt hull retained sufficient strength. Nonetheless, despite planned enhancements such as a six-channel anti-aircraft fire control system, (Note: It combined 40 mm and 4-inch fire against specific targets) the existing twin 4-inch turrets, even with roof-mounted tracking radar, (Note: As on the cruiser Bermuda and the aircraft carrier Victorious twin 3-inch gun turrets) were considered outdated when compared to the faster-firing US Navy twin 3"/50 mounts (fitted on HMS Victorious) or the British 3-inch/70 guns installed on the Tiger-class cruisers.

Efforts to retrofit Swiftsure and Superb with 3-inch/70 turrets were abandoned in 1951. The planned 40 mm L/70 rearmament was similarly discontinued due to the need for a costly (£0.5 million) conversion from DC to AC electrical systems and the broader impact of the 1957 Defence Review, which led to the cancellation of remaining orders for single and twin 40 mm L/70 mounts. While updated versions of the RN Mk 19 twin 4-inch AA guns continued to be installed through the 1950s—most recently on HMS Bermuda (1957) and HMS Belfast (1959)—they were already obsolete compared with newer 4.5-inch guns fitted to the Ca-class destroyers and Type 81 (Tribal) class frigates.

Although some Mk 5 and Mk 7/9 40 mm Bofors mounts remained effective against early jet aircraft, by 1959, these systems were increasingly regarded as outdated, particularly in light of emerging threats from missile and high-altitude aerial attacks. The last installations of multiple Type 262 radar-controlled Mk 5 mounts were made in 1959 aboard HMS Hermes and Belfast.

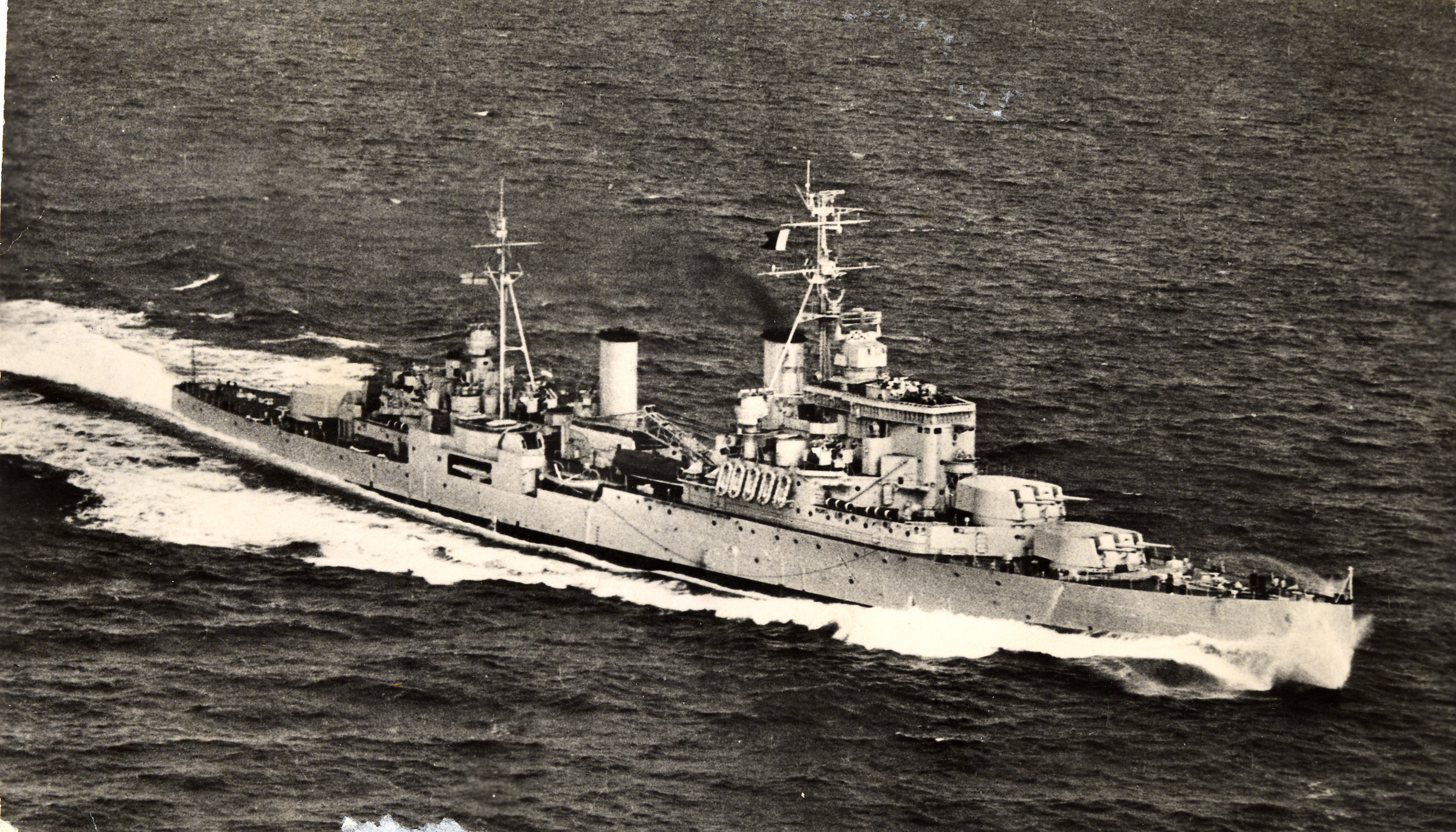
Swiftsure, 10 September 1950

In early 1958, structural issues further delayed progress when it was discovered that Swiftsure's hull had compressed by more than 18 inches (46 cm) under the weight of the new bridge structure. Internal stanchions were added to prevent further deformation. This structure, similar to that fitted on Belfast, was intended to house data links for carriers and an operations room equipped with screens for the Type 965 radar and Type 184 sonar, as proposed by the Admiralty in 1957. Although the hull reconstruction was largely completed by early 1959, the old armament was deemed too obsolete to reinstall.

While a new configuration with 3-inch/70 turrets in 'A', 'B', 'X', and 'Y' positions was considered, converting the electrical system to AC added another £0.5 million to the estimated cost. Slow progress in developing the 3-inch/70 calibre guns further complicated the situation. Instead, Victorious was fitted with less capable US 3-inch/50 mounts. Ultimately, the RN ordered only 25 of the 3-inch/70 mounts—destined for the Tiger-class cruisers, Type 41 AA frigates, and GWS missile-cruiser projects—all of which were cancelled in 1957. The surplus mounts were sold to the Royal Canadian Navy that year.

In the United States, the US Navy also encountered problems with these mounts, ultimately fitting them on USS Norfolk, four Mitscher-class DDLs, and several Gearing-class destroyers—though they were never operationally used.

Growing criticism in the press and Parliament regarding the rising costs and outdated capabilities of modernised cruisers led to the early sale of HMS Ceylon and HMS Newfoundland to Peru, the abandonment of Swiftsure's refit, and attempts to expedite HMS Lion's return to service via shortcut refits. The large order for proximity-fused 40 mm L/70 mounts was also cancelled to redirect funding towards completing the two partially finished Tiger-class ships.

HMS Superb, Swiftsure's sister ship, was paid off into reserve in late 1957 after just 12 years of service. Her similar modernisation plans were abandoned in April 1957, and she was sold for scrap in early 1960, making her one of the first Fiji- or Improved Minotaur-class cruisers to be dismantled.

Alternative proposals for converting Swiftsure into a helicopter carrier were under serious consideration as early as 1958. In November 1960, the ship was still being reviewed for possible conversion—either to a missile-armed ship with Seaslug systems or a helicopter carrier capable of operating 10–12 helicopters. A full conversion with a flat deck was estimated to cost approximately £7 million. Less extensive proposals involved removing the 'Y' 6-inch turret while retaining the forward Mk 23 turret, but none were pursued.

Swiftsure was eventually sold for scrapping, arriving at the Inverkeithing yard of Thos. W. Ward on 17 October 1962. Prior to her final voyage, her three 6-inch triple turrets were removed to reduce top weight for the tow from Chatham to Scotland. Although the helicopter carrier concept was not implemented on Swiftsure, it was later realised in the 1960s with conversions of the Tiger-class cruisers HMS Blake and HMS Tiger.

== Publications ==
- Brown, D. K. & Moore, George (2003). Rebuilding the Royal Navy: Warship Design Since 1945. Annapolis, Maryland: Naval Institute Press. ISBN 1-59114-705-0.
- Colledge, J. J.; Wardlow, Ben & Bush, Steve (2020). Ships of the Royal Navy: The Complete Record of All Fighting Ships of the Royal Navy from the 15th Century to the Present (5th ed.). Barnsley, UK: Seaforth Publishing. ISBN 978-1-5267-9327-0.
- Friedman, Norman (2010). British Cruisers: Two World Wars and After. Barnsley, UK: Seaforth Publishing. ISBN 978-1-59114-078-8.
- Friedman, Norman (2013). Naval Anti-Aircraft Guns And Gunnery. Barnsley, UK: Seaforth Publishing. ISBN 978-1-84832-177-9.
- Raven, Alan & Roberts, John (1980). British Cruisers of World War Two. Annapolis, Maryland: Naval Institute Press. ISBN 0-87021-922-7.
- Friedman, Norman (2013). Naval Anti-Aircraft Guns And Gunnery. Barnsley, UK: Seaforth Publishing. ISBN 978-1-84832-177-9.
- Murfin, David (2010). "AA to AA: The Fijis Turn Full Circle". In Jordan, John (ed.). Warship 2010. Naval Institute Press. ISBN 978-1-84486-110-1.
- Whitley, M. J. (1995). Cruisers of World War Two: An International Encyclopedia. London: Cassell. ISBN 1-86019-874-0.
