= Minotaur-class cruiser (1947) =

Proposed class of Royal Navy cruisers

Class overview
- Name: Design Z (Minotaur)
- Operators: Royal Navy
- Preceded by: Neptune class (planned)
- Succeeded by: Tiger class (actual)
- Planned: 6
- Cancelled: 6

General characteristics Design Z, Version D
- Type: Light cruiser
- Displacement: 15,280 long tons (15,525 t) standard 18,415 long tons (18,711 t) deep load
- Length: 645 ft (197 m) pp
- Beam: 75 ft (23 m)
- Draught: 24 ft 0 in (7.32 m)
- Installed power: 100,000 shp (75 MW)
- Propulsion: Four Admiralty-type three drum boilers; Four shaft Parsons steam turbines
- Speed: 33.5 kn (62.0 km/h; 38.6 mph) (light) 31.5 kn (58.3 km/h; 36.2 mph) (deep load)
- Range: 6,000 nmi (11,000 km; 6,900 mi) at 20 knots (37 km/h)
- Complement: 1,090
- Armament: 5 × dual 6 in QF Mk V guns; 8 × twin 3 in QF Mk VI AA guns; 4× quadruple 21 in (533 mm) torpedo tubes
- Armour: Belt 3.5 in (89 mm); Bulkheads 3.5–2 in (89–51 mm); Turrets 4–1.5 in (102–38 mm); Decks 1.5 in (38 mm)

General characteristics Design ZA alternative
- Class & type: Light cruiser
- Displacement: 13,870 long tons (14,093 t) standard 16,760 long tons (17,029 t) deep load
- Length: 616 ft (188 m) pp
- Beam: 73 ft (22 m)
- Draught: 23 ft 6 in (7.16 m)
- Installed power: 110,000 shp (82 MW)
- Propulsion: Four Admiralty-type three drum boilers; Four shaft Parsons steam turbines
- Speed: 33.5 kn (62.0 km/h; 38.6 mph) (light) 31.5 kn (58.3 km/h; 36.2 mph) (deep load)
- Range: 6,000 nmi (11,000 km; 6,900 mi) at 20 knots (37 km/h)
- Complement: 1,090
- Armament: 5 × dual 6 in QF Mk V guns; 8 × twin 3 in QF Mk VI AA guns; 4× quadruple 21 in (533 mm) torpedo tubes
- Armour: Belt 3.5 in (89 mm); Bulkheads 3.5–2 in (89–51 mm); Turrets 4–1.5 in (102–38 mm); Decks 1.5 in (38 mm)
- Notes: Smaller alternative of main Minotaur design

The Minotaur class, or Design Z, was a proposed class of light cruisers planned for the British Royal Navy shortly after the Second World War. Design Z had several proposed configurations with differing armament and propulsion arrangements. The designs were large ships that were planned to be armed with ten 6 in (152 mm) dual purpose guns and an extensive array of 3 in (76 mm) secondary guns. Six ships of the class were planned in 1947 but they were ultimately cancelled before construction could begin, owing to the post-war economic difficulties of the United Kingdom and shifting naval priorities.

== Development ==
The Design Z proposals for light cruisers were evolutions of the Design Y ( Neptune class) that were planned during the final years of the Second World War. It was intended to take advantage of improved hull subdivision, maximise commonality with the United States Navy and more advanced AA/DP automatic 3-inch and 6-inch twin gun designs of 1945 than the more incremental guns and turrets and design for the Neptunes. Like the 1944 N2, the Minotaur, Design Z was borne from increased crew size and the serious habitability problems with the modern but cramped Fiji (Crown Colony)-class cruiser the derived 1943 Minotaur-class and the Dido-class cruiser (and improved Dido) anti-aircraft classes post war, This demanded either much smaller gun turrets and smaller higher performance guns as in N2 or much larger cruiser designs - Neptune or Minotaur and its 1947 Z derivative. The Director Gunnery and Anti-Air Division (DGD) further proposed that future cruisers should be armed with dual-purpose 6 in (150 mm) and 3 in (76 mm) guns as on the American Worcester class then under construction. In 1946, following orders from the Deputy First Sea Lord to rework existing cruiser designs for improved habitability, the Director of Naval Construction (DNC) developed a series of designs that would mount the new twin 6-inch Mk 26 mounts; these designs were designated as different versions of Design Z.

In a June 1946 meeting that compared the Neptune design with the various Design Z versions, the First Sea Lord deemed version D with five twin 6-inch Mk 26 mounts and eight twin 3-inch mounts to be acceptable; the design had three superfiring Mk 26 mounts forward and two aft. This design was given the name Minotaur (the previous HMS Minotaur, lead ship of the 1943 9,000 ton class, had been transferred before completion to Canada and renamed HMCS Ontario and the class were named after HMS Swiftsure instead), to distinguish it from the Neptune designs and replaced the latter in the building programme. The Minotaur design would displace 15,280 long tons (15,530 t) standard and 18,415 long tons (18,711 t) deep load.

In 1947, the DNC compared the Minotaur design with USS Worcester; the comparison file also included several Design Z alternatives and refinements to Minotaur. Design Z4C combined engine and boiler rooms, while designs ZA and ZB were two smaller alternatives with the same general characteristics of armament, protection, and speed, but with reduced space. Design ZA also had the front two turrets mounted at the same level and reduced the overall length, which then required an increase in propulsive power from 100,000 shp (75 MW) to 110,000 shp (82 MW) to make the required 31.5 knots (58.3 km/h; 36.2 mph).

=== Suspension ===
The cruiser programme, which consisted of the new Minotaur class and completion of the Tiger-class (third group of the previous Minotaur class), was suspended in 1947 due to lack of immediate threat, the austerity budget imposed by the Labour government as a consequence of Britain's war debts and to allow reconsideration of cruiser design. The comparable Worcester design was really being completed as design prototypes; much USN opinion being it was of little value as it had been ordered for a supposed threat of bombers operating 6–9 mi (9,700–14,500 m) high, and to counter the wartime threat of the first German anti-ship missiles. (Note: The German remotely controlled Fritz X glide bomb first came to Allies notice when used against ships at Salerno in 1943) But in the 1940s high level bombing had remained far too inaccurate to hit large warships, and the actual high level threat was reconnaissance planes and shadowers and potential launches (of Fritz X type missiles) from outside any possible gun range. US opinion therefore generally supposed further development of large AA cruisers and guns of larger than 5 inches and the Worcesters - built on a similar hull to Salem class with autoloading 8-inch guns - were nearly converted to mount the same 8-inch turrets. The Royal Navy thought that a RN 'cruiser/destroyer', similar to and derived from the US Mitscher-class Destroyer Leaders of about 3,750 tons (Note: a concept which, in 1949–51, the RN envisaged as potentially armed with three US Mk 54 single 5-inch and two twin 3-inch 50-cals) might be sufficient to meet the limited interim threat perceived from Soviet gun cruisers. A substantial legacy aircraft carrier programme of Eagle, Ark Royal and the four intermediate Centaur-class carriers was under construction and the immediate cruiser need was provided by the structural reconstruction of two Town-class cruisers (HMS Newcastle and Birmingham) and two Fiji-class (Kenya and Newfoundland ) with new Type 274, 275 and 262 fire control. Design work, however, continued on the Minotaur class in the meantime.

The Korean War, along with the arrival of the 20,000 ton Soviet Sverdlov design, saw the Naval staff once again put cruiser options before the British Cabinet in 1951. The options were; (1) A fully designed Minotaur (1951) cruiser with five twin Mk 26 6 inch turrets but only four twin 3-inch/70 AA armament; (2) Mk 3 broad beam Dido cruiser with four twin Mk 6 4.5 turrets and; (3) Immediate restarted Tiger class with Mk 24 turrets in A & B and Mk 6 4.5 twins in X and Y positions - probably similar to the final offer to complete the class for the RAN in mid 1945. The decision was, however, to complete the Tiger to a 1948-9 design, with Mk 26 twin 6-inch and 3-inch/70 armament.

The options for a new cruiser alternative to the Tiger in November 1954 were; the C17, a small cruiser of 10,000 ton light with three twin Mk 26 6 inch and four Mk 11 L/70 or; a new Tiger sized cruiser with a 'cruiser/destroyer' armament of two twin 5/56 (in large turrets sized for the cruiser) two twin L70, and a sextriple 'Vanguard' Bofors in Y position (in the turret design dev into the twin 3/70) with cruiser armour and AD/AW processing. The evident difficulty of developing rapid fire 5-inch guns of acceptable weight and reliability meant however that in 1955 it was decided to limit gun options for missile cruisers to the new twin 6 inch and 3-inch/70. This resulted in the several missile cruiser designs that received staff approval in 1956/7 being similar in dimensions to the proposals of 1947 and 1951 for the Minotaur, with two twin 6-inch gun turrets in A and B position, two-four twin 3-inch turrets and 40 mm light anti-aircraft guns.

A Minotaur size hull and armour was seen by naval staff as necessary for major Pacific and Indian Ocean carrier escorts with long range endurance, stores and workshops, as well as modern guns and missiles combining surface and AA guns, 3D Type 984 radar and a viable large armoured magazine for 48 Seaslug missiles with 16 of these as nuclear missiles (Note: RAF Bristol Bloodhound and USN Terrier AA missiles had special variants) However, Mountbatten, following the Suez Crisis in 1956, saw "no use" for cruisers and closed the RN cruiser design department in April 1957 Mountbatten had always favoured smaller guided missile destroyers to carry Seaslug and vetoed nuclear weapons as impractical for anti-aircraft duties on political and escalation grounds. The cruiser department became the new nuclear submarine design unit.

== Design ==
=== Armament ===
The main gun armament was to be ten Quick-Firing (QF) 6 in (152 mm) Mark V dual-purpose guns in Mk 26 dual mounts. The new Mk 26 mounts had full remote power control (RPC) and featured automatic loading that gave each gun a designed rate of fire of 15-20 rounds per minute, considerably faster than the 6-8 rounds per minute of the older Mk 24 mounts. The guns were individually sleeved and fired a 129.75 lb (58.9 kg) shell out to 25,000 yd (23 km). While the Minotaur-class cruisers were cancelled, the guns and mountings were eventually fitted onto the Tiger class, whose hulls were laid down during the Second World War and was later redesigned to accommodate these mounts.

The secondary armament consisted of rapid fire 3 in (76 mm) guns in eight twin mountings that would replace the QF 4.5-inch secondary guns as well as the Bofors 40 mm gun and 20 mm Oerlikon anti-aircraft guns of previous cruiser designs. The DNC considered the 3-inch shell to be the smallest that could accommodate a proximity fuse which made it more ideal for high angle anti-aircraft fire. The Director Naval Ordnance (DNO) also adopted this calibre in order to achieve commonality with the United States Navy which developing the 3"/70 gun with UK but on a different mount.

== Planned construction ==
Six Minotaur-class cruisers were planned over a ten-year period by the Royal Navy, with the same names as planned for the Neptune-class cruiser design: Minotaur, Neptune, Centurion, Edgar, Mars, and Bellerophon. The plan involved laying down two cruisers in 1951, 1952, and 1953 with completion in 1954, 1955, and 1956 respectively. Due to cost and the emphasis on aircraft carriers and anti-submarine warfare after the Second World War this plan ultimately never materialized.

== Sources ==
- Brown, David K.; Moore, George (2012). Rebuilding the Royal Navy: Warship Design Since 1945. Barnsley, UK: Seaforth Publishing. ISBN 978-1-84832-150-2.
- Friedman, Norman (2010). British Cruisers: Two World Wars and After. Barnsley, UK: Seaforth Publishing. ISBN 978-1-84832-078-9.
- Raven, Alan; Roberts, John (1980). British Cruisers of World War Two. Arms & Armour Press. ISBN 0853683042.
