= QF 6-inch Mark N5 gun =

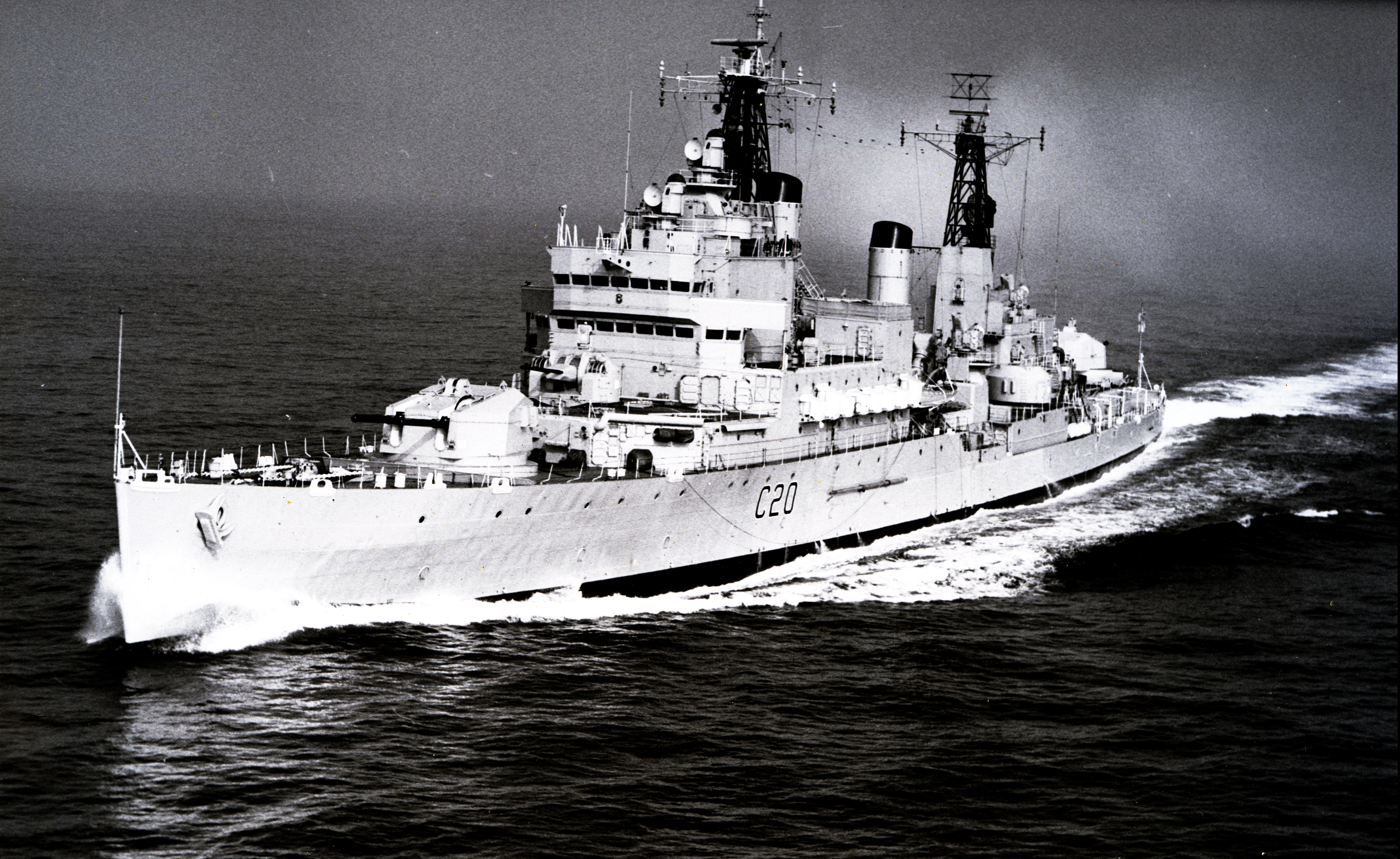
- HMS Tiger at sea in 1965, showing the large twin 6 inch gun mounting
- Type: Naval gun
- Place of origin: United Kingdom

Service history
- In service: 1959–1979
- Used by: Royal Navy

Production history
- Designed: 1944 (suspended and resumed, 1948)

Specifications
- Mass: 15,344 lb (6.960 t)
- Length: 315 in (8.0 m)
- Barrel length: 300 in (7.62 m) (50 calibres)
- Shell: AP: 129.75 lb (58.85 kg); HE: 132 lb (60 kg)
- Calibre: 6-inch (152 mm)
- Breech: Horizontally sliding breech block (hydraulic operation)
- Carriage: Modified Mark XXVI (Mark 26)
- Elevation: -5 to +78.5 degrees
- Rate of fire: 15 to 20 rounds per minute
- Muzzle velocity: 2,520 ft/s (770 m/s)
- Maximum firing range: 25,000 yd (23,000 m) at 45 degrees elevation (firing AP shot)

The QF 6-inch Gun Mark N5 (initially designated QF 6-inch Mk V) was a British naval gun, which was developed in the post-war period. It was the last large gun to be operational with the Royal Navy.

== Development ==
The development of the Mark V gun started during the Second World War and was intended for triple Mark 25 mountings on the projected Neptune-class cruisers. When the Neptune-class ships were cancelled in 1946, the gun was redesigned to be mounted in pairs on the new and complex Mark 26 dual purpose mounting and gun turret designed for rapid automatic fire on the projected Design Z (Minotaur-class) cruiser. These were to be the first British 6-inch guns in over sixty years to use brass cartridges instead of bagged charges. By the time the first two experimental weapons had been completed in 1949, the Minotaur-class had been cancelled, and after some time it was decided to use the N5 gun (as the Mark V had been redesignated) with the Mark 26 mounting on the Tiger-class cruisers, whose hulls had been built during the war and had since been totally redesigned. Initial trials were undertaken at the Shoeburyness ranges on the Essex coast.

A prototype of the complete gun, mounting and turret system was mounted on the County-class cruiser HMS Cumberland which had been converted to a trials ship in 1949–1951. The turret was mounted in the "B" (forward, upper) position, while mounted on the "X" position (aft, upper) was a twin Vickers QF 3-inch Mark N1 gun which was also under development for the Tiger-class. In April 1957, Cumberland sailed for the Mediterranean for firing trials in the course of which she expended 645 6-inch rounds.

The guns were operated in conjunction with the Gun Direction System (GDS1) and a Type 992 radar. The cruisers were to carry two twin 6-inch mounts (one fore and one aft). Together with the 3-inch guns they were intended to be able to fire a barrage of 800 shells per minute.

== Service ==
The guns entered service with the Royal Navy when HMS Tiger was commissioned in 1959. The weapon system gained a reputation for unreliability and difficult maintenance, however the main problem was the number of technicians required to keep the guns operational. This was especially true of the earlier hydraulically actuated mountings while later versions were electrically operated. Two of the ships, HMS Blake in 1969 and HMS Tiger in 1972, underwent a radical conversion which replaced the aft 6-inch turret with a helicopter flight deck and hangar. These two ships remained in service until December 1979 when Blake fired her guns for the last time in the English Channel; they were the last 6-inch guns ever to be fired from a British warship.
