= HMS Blake (C99) =

1961 Tiger-class cruiser of the Royal Navy

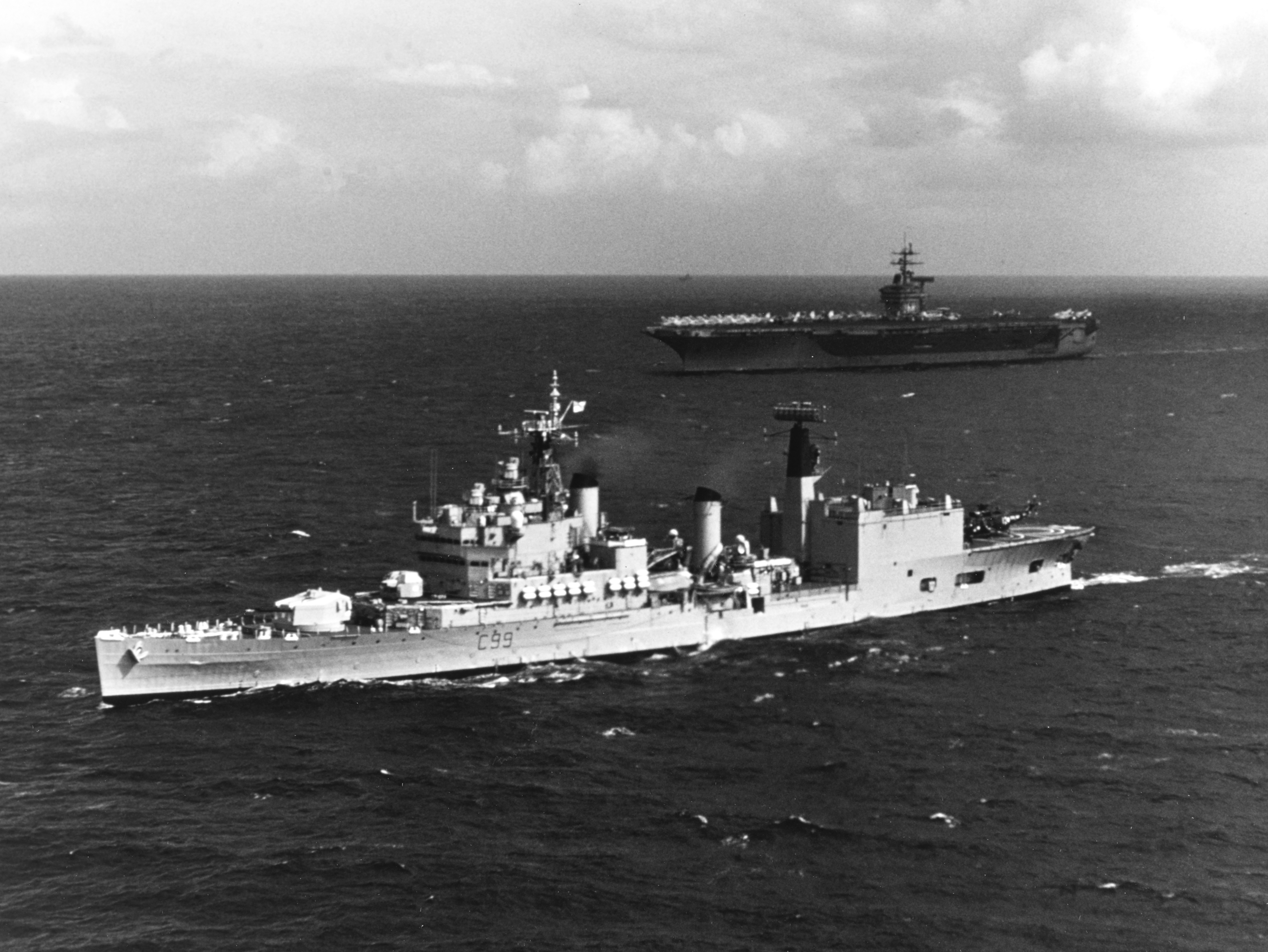
- Blake in 1975 with the US carrier Nimitz

History

United Kingdom
- Name: HMS Blake
- Namesake: Robert Blake
- Ordered: 1942 Additional Naval Programme
- Builder: Fairfield Shipbuilding and Engineering Company, Govan
- Laid down: 17 August 1942
- Launched: 20 December 1945
- Commissioned: 18 March 1961
- Decommissioned: December 1979
- Identification: Pennant number: C99
- Nickname(s): 'Snakey Blakey'
- Fate: Sold for scrap August 1982

General characteristics
- Class & type: Tiger-class light cruiser
- Displacement: 11,560 tons as built; 12,080 tons after conversion
- Length: 555 ft 6 in (169.32 m) overall; 538 ft (164 m) between perpendiculars
- Beam: 64 ft (20 m)
- Draught: 21 ft (6.4 m)
- Propulsion: HuFour Admiralty-type three drum boilers (400 psi); Four shaft Parsons steam turbines; 80,000 shp
- Speed: 31.5 knots (58.3 km/h)
- Range: 8,000 nautical miles (15,000 km) at 16 knots (30 km/h)
- Complement: 716 (885 after conversion)
- Armament: As built: Four × QF 6 inch Mark N5 guns (2 × 2); Six × QF 3-inch Mark N1 guns (3 × 2); After conversion: Two × 6 in (1 × 2); Two × 3 in (1 × 2); Two × Seacat quad missile launchers
- Aircraft carried: After conversion: Four helicopters (originally Westland Wessex, then Sea King)

HMS Blake was a light cruiser of the Tiger class of the British Royal Navy, the last (traditional) Royal Navy gun-armed cruiser of the 20th century. She was named after Robert Blake, a 17th-century admiral who was the "Father of the Royal Navy".

== Construction and commissioning ==
She was ordered and laid down in 1942 as one of the Minotaur class of light cruisers. They had a low construction priority due to more pressing requirements for other ship types during World War II, particularly anti-submarine craft. In 1944, she was renamed Tiger, then back to Blake again in 1945, the year she was launched partially constructed at the Fairfield Shipbuilding and Engineering Company at Govan, by Lady Jean Blake, wife of Vice Admiral Sir Geoffrey Blake. Construction was suspended in 1946 and she was laid up at Gareloch.

In 1954, construction of Blake resumed, but to a new design which had been approved in 1951. She would have fully automatic 6 inch guns in twin high-angle mounts with each gun capable of shooting 20 rounds per minute, and a secondary battery of fully automatic 3 inch guns which delivered 90 rounds per minute per gun. She would have no lighter anti-aircraft armament or torpedo tubes. Air conditioning was fitted throughout the ship, and a 200-line automatic telephone exchange was installed. Each 6 inch and 3 inch mounting had its own director, linked to a dedicated radar on the director. On 10 September 1957, an on-board explosion occurred whilst she was fitting-out at Govan; twenty people were injured. On 18 March 1961, Blake finally commissioned into the Royal Navy, to date the last (traditional) cruiser to do so. Just two years later, she was placed in reserve.

== Conversion ==
From 1965 to 1969, she underwent a conversion to become a helicopter and command cruiser. This reconstruction included replacing the aft 6 inch and 3-inch mounts with a flight deck and hangar. She also had new radars and taller funnels. She had command, control, and communications facilities installed, and found use as a flagship to task groups. The refit was expensive; during the conversion, a major fire broke out causing damage and raising the cost further. There were concerns that the money used to convert Blake and her sister ship Tiger to helicopter cruisers drained resources better used elsewhere.

== Later career ==
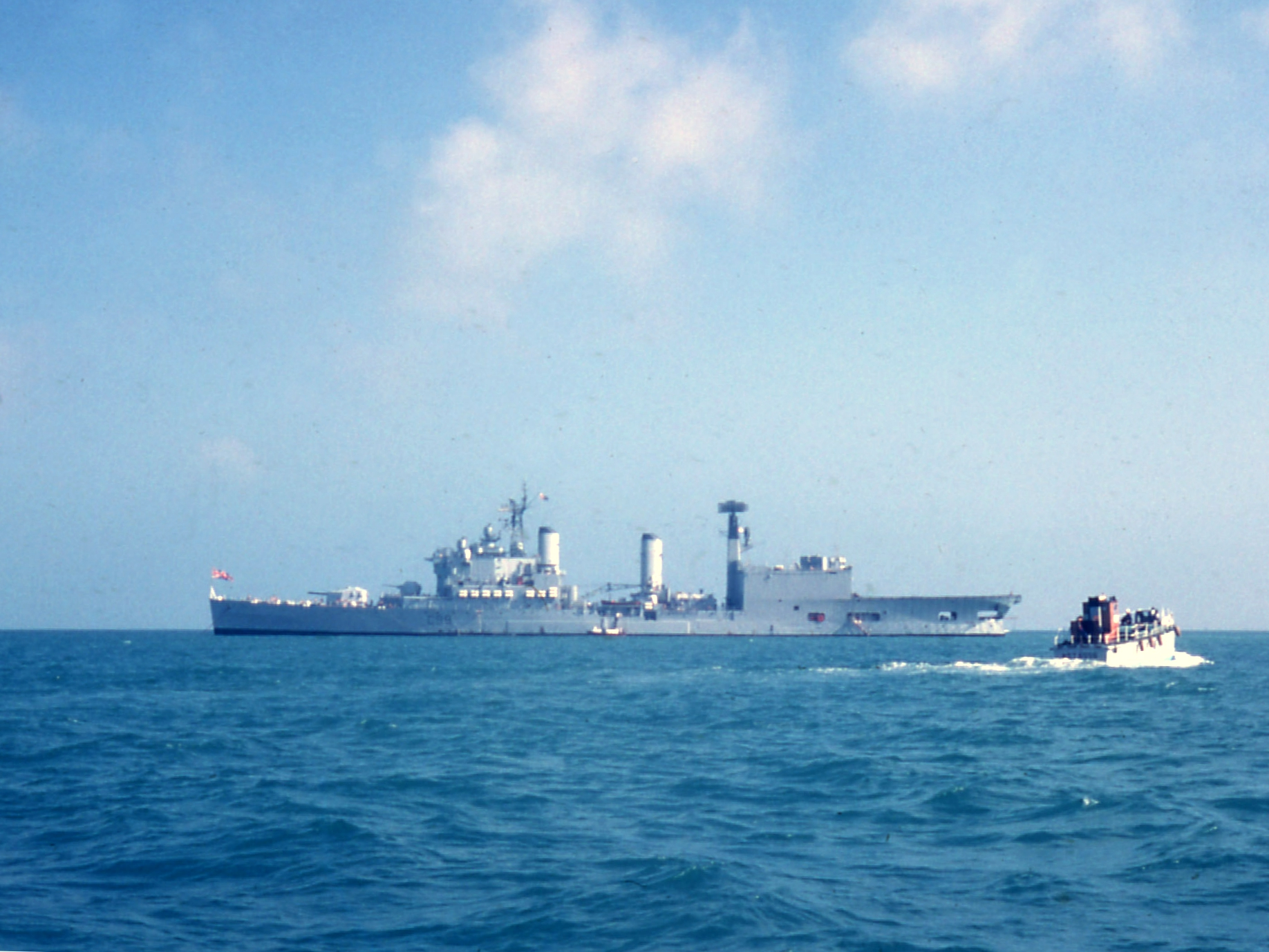
Blake off Key West in November 1978.

In 1969 Blake deployed to Gibraltar along with other Royal Navy units in order to ‘fly the flag’ in response to Spanish hostility following the closure of the Gibraltar-Spain border by General Franco. On 2 August 1969, a Royal Air Force Harrier GR.1 XV742 made an experimental landing on Blake . In 1971, she was present during the emotional withdrawal from Malta, supporting the commando carrier Bulwark. In 1977 she took part in the Fleet Review of the Royal Navy during the Silver Jubilee celebrations for Queen Elizabeth II, which took place off Spithead, site of many Fleet Reviews.

The cruiser carried Westland Wessex HAS.3 helicopters of 820 Naval Air Squadron from June 1969; these were replaced by the Westland Sea King HAS.1 helicopter in December 1972, continuing until Blake was withdrawn from service in 1979. Blake was the last ship to fire a six-inch gun in the Royal Navy. Her large crew made her an expensive ship to operate and maintain.

== Decommissioning ==
Blake was refitted in 1980, and due to a defence manpower drawdown that resulted in manpower shortages, became part of the Standby Squadron in HMNB Chatham. The advent of the Falklands War led to a rapid ship survey in early April 1982 and work was immediately begun to recommission her and sister ship Tiger for service in the conflict, but work was stopped on both in late May when it was clear neither could be ready in time to be deployed. Chile showed some interest in acquiring both her, and Tiger in June–July, but a proposed deal did not go through for the ships, despite both being in good shape and that a good deal of reactivation work had been accomplished the past April–May. She was sold for scrap on 25 August 1982 to Shipbreaking (Queenborough) Ltd for £210,000. She was the last cruiser serving with the Royal Navy upon her decommissioning. She was sold for breaking up in August 1982 and on 29 October 1982, she was towed from Chatham for Cairnryan, near Stranraer in Scotland, arriving 7 November 1982.

The 1961-1963 ship's bell of Blake has been preserved and was on display in Saint Mary's Church, Bridgwater, until 2016. Following the reordering of the church it was transferred to Blake Museum, Bridgwater where it forms part of the display about Robert Blake.

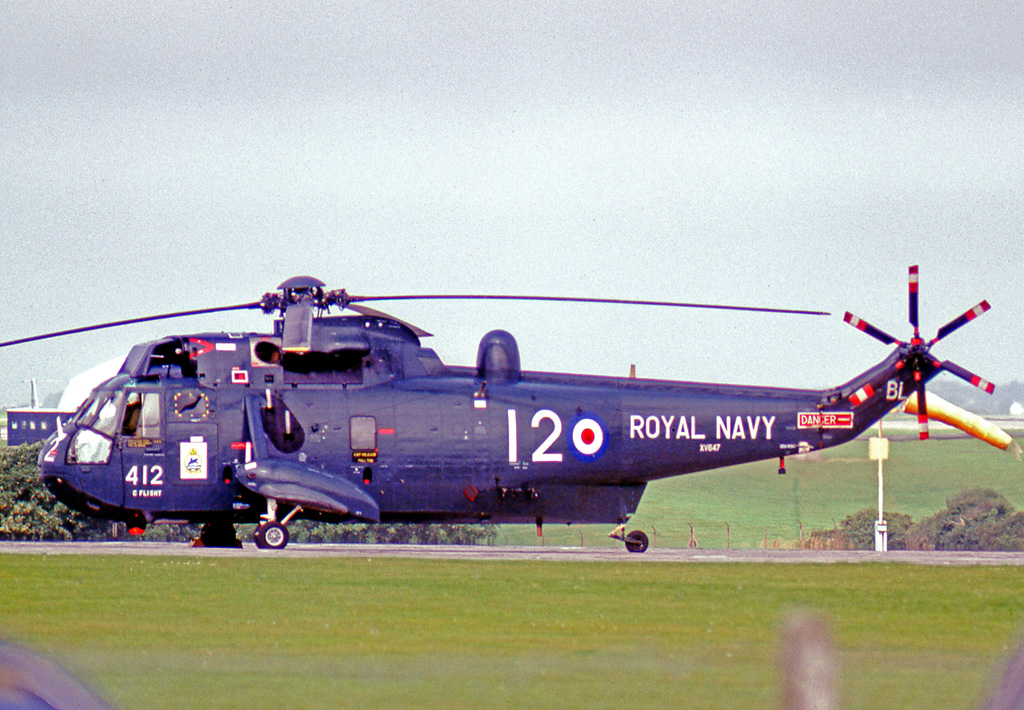
A Westland Sea King HAS.2 of 820 Naval Squadron wearing the 'BL' code of HMS Blake in 1977

== Sources ==
- Colledge, J. J.; Warlow, Ben (2006) [1969]. Ships of the Royal Navy: The Complete Record of All Fighting Ships of the Royal Navy from the 15th Century to the Present (3rd Rev ed.). London: Chatham Publishing. ISBN 978-1-86176-281-8. OCLC 67375475.
- Gardiner, Robert, ed. (1980). Conway's All the World's Fighting Ships 1922 - 1946. London: Conway Maritime Press.
- Gardiner, Robert, ed. (1983). Conway's All the World's Fighting Ships 1947 - 1982. London: Conway Maritime Press.
- Jane's Fighting Ships 1950-51. London: Janes Publishing. 1950.
- Raven, Alan; Roberts, John (1980). British Cruisers of World War Two. London: Arms and Armour Press.
- Sturtivant, Ray; Ballance, Theo (1994). The Squadrons of the Fleet Air Arm. Tonbridge, Kent: Air-Britain (Historians) Ltd. ISBN 0-85130-223-8.
- Whitley, M J (1905). Cruisers of World War Two: An Illustrated Encyclopedia. London: Arms and Armour Press.
- HMS Blake at Uboat.net
- A history of the Tiger class
