= Neptune-class cruiser =

Unbuilt class of late WW2 naval ships

Class overview
- Name: Neptune class
- Operators: Royal Navy
- Preceded by: Minotaur class (1943)
- Succeeded by: Tiger class; Minotaur class (1947)
- Planned: 5
- Cancelled: 5

General characteristics (as designed)
- Class & type: Light cruiser
- Displacement: 18,700 long tons (19,000 t) deep load
- Length: 662 ft (202 m) o/a
- Beam: 76 ft (23 m)
- Draught: 24 ft 9 in (7.54 m)
- Installed power: 108,000 shp (81 MW)
- Propulsion: Four Admiralty-type three drum boilers; Four shaft Parsons steam turbines
- Speed: 33 kn (61 km/h; 38 mph)
- Range: 7,500 nmi (13,900 km; 8,600 mi) at 20 knots (37 km/h)
- Complement: 1351
- Armament: 4 × triple QF 6-inch Mark V; 6 × twin QF 4.5-inch Mk V; 10 × twin Bofors 40 mm gun; 14 × twin Oerlikon 20 mm cannon; 4 × quadruple 21 in (533 mm) torpedo tubes
- Armour: Belt 4–1.5 in (102–38 mm); Bulkheads 4 in (100 mm); Turrets 2–1 in (51–25 mm)

The Neptune class was a proposed class of cruisers planned for the British Royal Navy in the latter years of the Second World War. They were large ships which were to be armed with twelve 6-inch (152 mm) dual-purpose guns and with a heavy secondary armament. Although five ships of the class were planned in 1944, they were cancelled following the end of the war and before construction could begin.

== Development and design ==
In 1942, work began at the British Admiralty as to the requirements for the next class of cruisers to be built for the Royal Navy as a follow-on to the Minotaur class (Note: later renamed Swiftsure class when HMS Minotaur was transferred to the Royal Canadian Navy and entered service as Ontario) which were based on the pre-war Fiji class. A small anti-aircraft (AA) cruiser design with six or eight 5.25 in (133 mm) dual-purpose guns (i.e. capable of both anti-ship and anti-aircraft fire) was developed into the July 1943 N2 design, armed with four twin 5.25-inch turrets of a new design and displacing 8,650 long tons (8,790 t) standard, and this was approved for inclusion in the 1944 construction programme. In October 1943, the First Lord of the Admiralty, Dudley Pound, resigned; his replacement, Andrew Cunningham, disliked the small cruiser and work was switched to a large cruiser, described at first as an "improved Belfast", armed with twelve 6-inch guns.

=== Hull and machinery ===
The new design was 662 feet (202 m) long overall and 655 feet (200 m) at the waterline, with a beam of 76 feet (23.2 m) and a draught of 24 feet 9 inches (7.5 m), with the ships' hull form based on that of the Courageous-class battlecruiser ("large light cruiser") of the First World War. Displacement was 15,350 long tons (15,600 t) standard and 18,700 long tons (19,000 t) at deep load. The ships were not fitted with facilities for carrying aircraft, so the bridge was lower than in preceding classes of cruiser, while the two superstructure blocks were longer than in previous ships; the forward superstructure extending back to the forward funnel and the aft superstructure covered the base of the aft funnel. A long forecastle was planned, reaching back beyond the aft funnel, although in 1946, it was suggested to change to a flush-deck hull.

One of the problems identified with the small 5.25-inch-armed cruiser was that its speed - 28 knots (52 km/h; 32 mph) - in deep load condition - was inadequate to keep up with the aircraft carriers that the cruisers were meant to escort. The new design therefore had a much higher design speed. Four Admiralty 3-drum boilers fed steam at 400 pounds per square inch (2,800 kPa) to Parsons single-reduction geared steam turbines rated at 108,000 shaft horsepower (81,000 kW) and driving four propeller shafts. This gave a design speed of 33 knots (61 km/h; 38 mph); 32 knots (59 km/h; 37 mph) at full load. The machinery was to be laid out in a unit scheme, with two sets of boilers and turbines separated to reduce the potential for a single torpedo or shell hit to cause complete loss of power. It was noted though by the Director of Naval Construction in June 1945 that the boiler rooms were still too close to avoid the possibility of both being knocked out by a single hit. The ship was planned to have a range of 7,500 nautical miles (13,890 km; 8,631 mi) at 20 knots (37 km/h; 23 mph).

=== Armament ===
The main gun armament was to be twelve 6-inch (152 mm) guns in four triple turrets. Consideration was given at first to using the existing Mark XXIV mountings planned for the Tiger-class ships, (Note: The Tiger-class were a number of ships that had begun as Minotaur-class cruisers but construction had been delayed; they were to be finished instead to an altered design.) as these could be delivered relatively quickly. The Mark XXIV (Note: Post war the Royal Navy changed from Roman to Arabic numerals in designations - the 'Mark XXIV' turret becoming the 'Mark 24')24, which was an improved version of the pre-war turret, was considered old fashioned however. A new mounting was chosen accepting the delays in construction that would ensue. The new turret, the Mark XXV, mounted three QF 6 inch Mark V guns, (Note: In British ordnance terminology, QF stands for Quick Firing, with the propellant change enclosed in a metal case rather than in bags) capable of firing at a rate of 10–12 rounds per minute per gun compared with 6-8 for the Mark XXIV, and elevating to 80 degrees, giving an anti-aircraft capability. A 130 lb (59 kg) armour-piecing shell could be fired to a range of 25,000 yards (22,860 m). The turrets were arranged conventionally on the ships' centreline, with two forward and two aft.

Secondary armament consisted of six QF 4.5 inch (113 mm) Mark V dual purpose guns in twin turrets as used in the Daring-class destroyer. These could fire a 55 lb (25 kg) shell to a range of 20,000 yd (18,000 m), with a maximum effective altitude for anti-aircraft fire of 19,700 ft (6,000 m). The guns were semi-automatic and fitted with a power loader, giving a maximum rate of fire of 24 rounds per minute per barrel. When the gun entered service, the power rammer proved unreliable and hand loading reduced the rate of fire to about 10–12 rounds per minute per barrel. The close-in anti-aircraft armament consisted of 20 Bofors 40 mm guns in 10 "Buster" self-contained twin mounts and 28 Oerlikon 20 mm cannon in 14 twin mounts. This was arranged as seven twin Bofors and four twin Oerlikons around the bridge, three twin Bofors and eight twin Oerlikons around the aft superstructure and two twin Oerlikons at the stern of the ship. Four quadruple 21-inch (533 mm) torpedo tubes were fitted.

Comprehensive fire-control equipment was proposed; two Low-Angle (LA) directors for the 6-inch guns for use against surface targets, four barrage directors for the 6-inch guns for barrage fire against aerial targets, and three combined HA/LA directors for the 4.5-inch guns for use against both surface and air targets. Each Bofors mount was to be fitted with an integrated fire control radar. This gave a capability for up to 17 aerial targets to be engaged simultaneously (four with long-range barrage fire from the 6-inch guns, three by the 4.5-inch guns and ten at short-range by the Bofors guns).

=== Armour ===
The ships' main vertical belt armour was 4 inches (100 mm) thick amidships, which thinned to 1 1/2 inches (38 mm) forwards and aft. Horizontal armour consisted of a 1-inch (25 mm) thick upper deck and a 1-inch thick lower deck, thickening to 1 1/2 inches over the ships' steering gear. The main gun turrets had 4-inch-thick faces with 2-inch (51 mm) thick armour on the turret roof, sides and rear. Longitudinal and transverse armoured bulkheads of up to 4-inch thickness were placed around the ships' machinery compartments and magazines.

=== Complement ===
The ships had a planned complement of 1,351 officers and ratings when operating as a flagship.

== Construction programme ==
Five ships to be named Neptune, Centurion, Edgar, Mars and Minotaur of the new design, which was now known as the Neptune class, were included in the 1944 construction programme anticipating that the war with Japan would not be concluded until 1946–1947. In addition, it was planned to complete the Bellerophon (at the time construction work was suspended) to the new design. (Note: Some sources also state that the partially built Minotaur-class cruiser Hawke, laid down in 1943, was also reordered as a Neptune.) It was expected that construction would be from 1944 to completion by 1950. The programme continued following the end of the war, with pressure growing to divert shipbuilding capacity to build more profitable ocean passenger liners, with it being hoped in November 1945 that two ships could be laid down as soon as possible.

In late February–March 1946 the Sea Lords, in drawing up the 1947 ship programme, decided to cancel the Neptune class. The order for Bellerophon was cancelled with the shipbuilder on 28 February 1946 and the Neptune class as whole stopped (in ADM 205/64) due to the lack of finance for cruiser construction in post war austerity Britain and deep division among the naval staff over the role of the cruiser in AA defence and joint operation with aircraft carriers in defence of and attack on trade. Given the priority of air defence, further consideration and planning with the United States Navy was required to determine the desired size and calibre of long range AA guns, and particular study was ordered on the new US Worcester, Mitscher and Juneau classes. (Note: The development of the Neptune-class design and its cancellation were covered by the Royal Navy, Director of Naval Construction Charles Lillicrap in a memo on 11 April 1946, ADM 167/127:1946.)

A last cruiser design, 96A GWA, of 18,200 tons was somewhat influenced by USS Galveston, the Talos cruiser, and USS Northampton. The three cruisers armed with guided missiles, were included in the 1956 construction programme for the Royal Navy, with delivery from 1962. Admiral Mountbatten, upon appointment as Chief of the Naval Staff in 1957 immediately ordered a review of the cruiser programme, on 4 January 1957, believing the large cruisers were of no practical use and far too big as guided missile-equipped ships. The UK financial crisis following the Suez Crisis and the cancellation of Sverdlov-class cruiser for the Soviet Navy under the new Soviet Premier Nikita Khrushchev were influences.

On 16 January 1957 the cruiser design office was closed and the three cruisers were cancelled in April 1957, along with the conversion of HMS Superb to a fourth Tiger-class cruiser. The new 6- and some 3-inch mounts were eventually used when three Tiger-class cruisers were completed to a new design in the late 1950s, The County-class destroyers met the Royal Navy's requirements for a surface-to-air missile armed ship.

== Sources ==
- Brown, David K. (2012). Nelson to Vanguard: Warship Design and Development 1923–1945. Barnsley, UK: Seaforth Publishing. ISBN 978-1-84832-149-6.
- Brown, David K.; Moore, George (2012). Rebuilding the Royal Navy: Warship Design Since 1945. Barnsley, UK: Seaforth Publishing. ISBN 978-1-84832-150-2.
- Friedman, Norman (2010). British Cruisers: Two World Wars and After. Barnsley, UK: Seaforth Publishing. ISBN 978-1-84832-078-9.
- Friedman, Norman (1997). The Naval Institute Guide to World Naval Weapons Systems 1997–1998. Annapolis, Maryland, USA: Naval Institute Press. ISBN 1-55750-268-4.
- Gardiner, Robert; Chesneau, Roger, eds. (1980). Conway's All The World's Fighting Ships 1922–1946. London: Conway's Maritime Press. ISBN 0-85177-146-7.
- Gardiner, Robert; Chumbley, Stephen, eds. (1995). Conway's All The World's Fighting Ships 1947–1995. Annapolis, Maryland, USA: Naval Institute Press. ISBN 1-55750-132-7.
- Lenton, H.T. (1973). Navies of the Second World War: British Cruisers. London: Macdonald & Co. ISBN 0-356-04138-7.
- Roberts, John & Raven, Alan (1980). British Cruisers of World War Two. Arms & Armour Press. ISBN 0853683042.
- Moore (2006), "Cruiser Development 1946-56", Warship 2006, Conway Maritime Press, ISBN 9781844860302
