= Tiger-class cruiser =

Class of British light cruisers

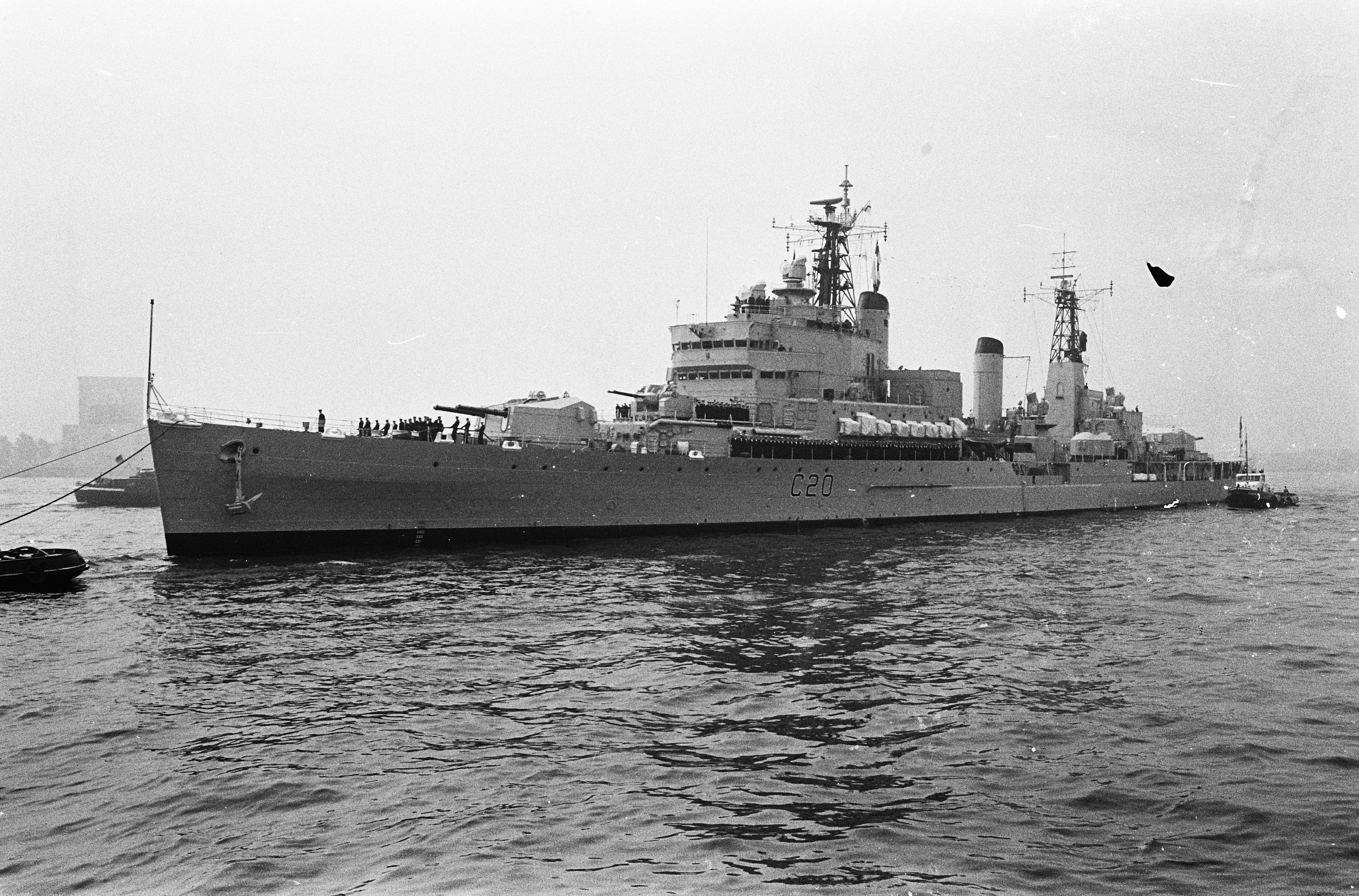
- HMS Tiger in 1963 before conversion

Class overview
- Name: Tiger class
- Builders: Fairfields Shipbuilding & Eng.; John Brown; Scotts Shipbuilding & Eng.
- Operators: Royal Navy
- Preceded by: Minotaur class
- Succeeded by: None
- Built: 1941–1961
- In commission: 1959–1979
- Completed: 3
- Retired: 3

General characteristics
- Class & type: Light cruiser
- Displacement: 11,700 tons (12,080 tons after conversion of Blake and Tiger)
- Length: 555.5 ft (169.3 m)
- Beam: 64 ft (20 m)
- Draught: 23 ft (7.0 m)
- Installed power: 80,000 shp (60 MW)
- Propulsion: Four Admiralty-type three drum boilers; Four shaft Parsons steam turbines
- Speed: 31.5 knots (58.3 km/h; 36.2 mph)
- Range: 8,000 nmi (15,000 km; 9,200 mi) at 16 knots (30 km/h; 18 mph)
- Complement: 716 (Tiger and Blake: 885 post-conversion)
- Sensors & processing systems: Tiger and Blake post-conversion: 1 × Type 965 air-surveillance radar with outfit AKE(1) aerial; 1 × Type 992Q target-indication radar; 2 × Type 903 gunfire-control radars (MRS 3 system); 2 × Type 904 Seacat fire-control radars (GWS 22 system)
- Armament: As built: 2 × twin QF 6-inch Mark N5 guns; 3 × twin QF 3-inch Mark N1 guns; Tiger and Blake post-conversion: 1 × twin 6-inch Mk. N5 guns; 1 × twin 3-inch N1 guns; 2 × quad SeaCat missile launchers - 42 Sea Cat SAM
- Armour: Belt 3.5–3.25 in (89–83 mm); Bulkheads 2–1.5 in (51–38 mm); Turrets 2–1 in (51–25 mm); Crowns of engine room and magazines 2 in (51 mm)
- Aircraft carried: Tiger and Blake post-conversion: 4 × Westland Wessex helicopters; Later replaced by: 4 × Westland Sea King helicopters

The Tiger class were a class of three British warships of the 20th century and the last all-gun cruisers of the Royal Navy. Construction of three Minotaur-class cruisers (under the names Blake, Defence and Bellerophon) began during World War II but, due to post-war austerity, the Korean War and focus on the Royal Air Force over the surface fleet, the hulls remained unfinished. Against a background of changing priorities and financial constraints, approval to complete them to a modified design was given in November 1954 and the three ships – Tiger, Lion and Blake – entered service from March 1959.

In January 1964, due to postponement of the Escort Cruiser programme, the cruisers were approved for conversion into helicopter-carrying cruisers. At first they were intended to carry four Westland Wessex helicopters for amphibious operations and anti-submarine protection operating "East of Suez" then four Westland Sea Kings for anti-submarine work. The conversion of Blake and Tiger, carried out between 1965 and 1972, was more expensive and time-consuming than expected and, with the UK Treasury opposing each cruiser's conversion, the conversion of Lion was cancelled and she was scrapped in 1975, having been used for spares for her sister ships.

Described in one book as "hideous and useless hybrids" after conversion and with limited manpower, resources, and better ships available, Tiger and Blake were decommissioned in the late 1970s and placed in reserve. Blake was scrapped in 1982 and Tiger in 1986.

== Design and commissioning ==
The three light cruisers that become the Tiger class came out of an order for eight 64-foot broad beam Modified and Improved Fiji-class cruisers as an immediate response to the Japanese attack on Pearl Harbor and the invasions of Siam and of British Malaya in December 1941. The order was part of the Royal Navy 1941 supplementary shipbuilding programme and 1942 estimates in April 1942 They were slightly improved models of the Ceylon (or Uganda) sub-group of the Fiji-class ordered in late 1939 and the 63-foot beam Minotaur group ordered in the 1941 Royal Navy programme. HMS Defence, Bellerophon, Blake and Hawke were begun as Minotaur-class cruisers (Note: The Minotaur design was itself a development of the Fiji (also known as Crown Colony) class) (Note: When Minotaur was transferred to the Royal Canadian Navy and renamed Ontario, the class was known as the Swiftsure class after the first of the class to be launched.) in 1941–43 with three triple 6-inch gun turrets in 1944. Production of the 1942 Design Light Fleet Carriers was given priority from August 1942 by the Future Building Committee and in August 1942, four unnamed Minotaur cruisers were cancelled and their machinery, builders and building slips reallocated to light fleet carriers. Bellerophon (which became Tiger in 1945) had been ordered in May 1941 and the keel laid down at (Browns Clydebank yard) with Swiftsure and Minotaur in October 1941. Blake's keel was started at Fairfields in August 1942. While the building schedules of Minotaur, Swiftsure and Defence were unaffected; construction of Blake and Tiger slowed; Hawke was not laid down until July 1943 and the eighth was never started. The priority of the light fleet carriers, anti-submarine escorts, the battleship Vanguard at Browns, and the large fleet carrier HMS Africa (a Malta-class carrier), ordered from Fairfield effectively suspended work on Bellerophon and Blake (Note: Blake was renamed Tiger in 1944 before reverting back to Blake in 1945) from March 1944 to July 1945. Work on Defence was delayed by industrial relations, strikes, conditions, sub-standard facilities and low quality steel at Scotts, Greenock. The problems at Scotts and concern over the delay to Defence and the Tiger-class led the Director of Naval Construction to visit Scotts' yard in August 1943 with work stopped by striking riveters, carpenters and shipwrights It was planned to launch Defence in April 1944 to complete in July 1945, for Hawke to launch in 1944 and commission mid-1945, with Blake and Tiger commissioning mid-1946. However only Minotaur, Swiftsure and Superb were completed by late 1945. Defence, well advanced in construction, was placed in reserve without armament fitted and spent eight years moored offshore in Gareloch.

=== Design changes ===
In March 1943 it was decided to upgrade the main armament from the Mk XXIII (re-designated post war in Arabic numerals as "Mark 23") triple 6-inch turret to the dual purpose (DP) electrically-powered Mk XXIV (Mark 24) triple 6-inch (Note: A full electric powered turret had been fitted in Diadem in 1944 and, with power ramming, the shells fired at consistent intervals and it had sufficient training and elevation speed to have some dual purpose capability against jet aircraft and early guided missiles.) on five cruisers ordered or under construction: Blake, Hawke, Tiger, Defence and Bellerophon. The guns in the new Mk 24 turret could reach a maximum of 60 degrees of elevation giving some anti-aircraft capability. The three more complete Minotaur cruisers, HMS Minotaur, Swiftsure and Superb would complete with the Mk 23 turret. In January 1943 it was decided to increase the beam of Bellerophon to 64 ft (20 m).

By late 1943 the effective defeat of German surface forces and the large American cruiser construction programme made the cruiser requirement less urgent. The planned delivery of fleet carriers, the light fleet carriers, escort carriers and the new Battle-class destroyers in 1944-45 made limiting the manpower requirements and future building programme an absolute priority for Churchill by October–December 1943 The RN had more cruisers and refitted cruisers than it had crew for and as a result two new classes of 5.25-inch gun cruisers - five 7,000 ton with three twin 5.25-inch turrets and the N2 class (Note: Four twin 5.25-inch DP turrets on a Fiji size hull with compact destroyer powertrain and more armour and fuel) - were cancelled by February 1944. Tiger-class construction was slowed and periodically suspended and new class of large Neptune-class cruisers (to be armed with the same Mk 24 turrets as the Tigers and have a second battery of QF 4.5-inch Mk V (Note: Later renamed as "Mark 6" guns) guns ordered for the Daring-class destroyers (Note: The Darings were not completed until after the war)) were delayed. Two new cruisers were passed to the RCN as Canada was seen as the UK's vital wartime ally; HMS Minotaur and the Fiji-class cruiser Uganda (Note: At the time of the agreement in 1943 Uganda was undergoing repair and refit in the USA) were gifted to Canada in April 1944 and Minotaur was handed over on schedule to the RCN in June 1945.

A proposal was made in 1944 and again in February 1945 for two new cruisers and two light aircraft carriers to be delivered to the Royal Australian Navy; the UK offering HMS Defence and Blake. The offer was delayed because Australia also had a manpower problem; by mid-1945 the manpower issue had not resolved and the Allies had overwhelming naval superiority and the idea was dropped. (Note: . In 1944 little work had been done on the offered cruisers other than to launch Defence in September 1944.) The RAN determined the service life of its two County-class heavy cruisers could be extended to 1950-54.

In 1944–45, the RN, CNS and government thought the merging of the cruiser and destroyer categories (Note: by expanding the new large Battle-class and Daring-class destroyers to 3,500 tons to allow for three twin 4.5-inch turrets and office space for radar data processing) was too early, expensive and radical. (Note: By mid-1945, the UK was facing severe constraints caused by Lend-Lease payments leading to period of fiscal austerity. Among other effects, this led in September 1945 to the cancellation of a batch of 25 US-built Mk 37 Type 275 radar-assisted gunnery systems which affected ships including the Tiger class.) With the planned Neptune class cancelled, the suspended ships were the only cruiser hulls available and worth considering for rearmament. By 1946, nine Mk 24 turrets were 75–80% complete with three further turrets partially complete for use with the Tiger cruisers. These turrets were a more advanced version of the wartime Mk 23 triple 6-inch (150 mm). The new Mk 24 6-inch mounts were interim electric turrets with remote power-control and power-worked breech. The Tiger design, like Superb, had a broader beam - a foot wider at 64 ft (20 m) beam - than Swiftsure on which to accommodate the larger turrets though it was preferred to complete Superb with the older Mk 23 turrets in 1945.

It was decided to mothball the three incomplete Tigers in November 1947 as the aircraft carriers Eagle and Centaur had priority. The Tigers were maintained as in some ways they were newer hulls with better internal and underwater protection, subdivision and compartments taking advantage of the removal of the hangar and X turret, Action Information centre, more light AA, pumps and electric generating capacity.

Another two Tiger-class cruisers were cancelled. Hawke was laid down in July 1943, and Bellerophon possibly had a keel laid down. Work on all the cruisers other than Superb stopped after mid-1944. (Note: Janes Fighting Ships 1944–45, states that Hawke was laid down in August 1944 as a Tiger) .Hawke was suspended in January 1945, and broken up in 1947 in the Portsmouth dockyard although her boilers and machinery were complete, and her new 6-inch guns close to completion.

=== Delay and redesign ===
The second Churchill government, elected in 1951, favoured the RAF and reduced the naval budget. With the RN priority being anti-submarine frigates, the restart of work on the Tiger cruisers (and reconstructions of other cruisers) was delayed by three years to 1954. The original decision to delay the Tigers in the late 1940s had been to reassess cruiser design and the provision of effective anti-aircraft (AA) fire-control to engage jet aircraft which was beyond UK industrial capability at the time. Consequently, higher priority was given to the battleship HMS Vanguard, the Battle-class destroyers and the two new Audacious-class aircraft carriers (Eagle and Ark Royal) for allocation of 26 US-supplied medium-range anti-aircraft gun directors (which had been delivered under Lend-Lease in 1944/5) The US version of the Type 275 High Altitude/Low Altitude DCT were stabilised and could track multiple air targets of Mach 1.5+. These US directors were superior to the British built Type 275 which was the only medium-range AA fire control until 1955 and could barely distinguish transonic targets at Mach 0.8. The 1947–49 period saw a peace dividend, and frigate construction became the priority in the Korean War.

By 1949 two alternative fits for the Tigers had been drawn up, one as anti-aircraft cruisers with six twin 3-inch 70 calibre and one with two twin QF 6-inch Mark N5 guns (Mark 26 automatic mountings) and three twin 3-inch/70s. Both were designed primarily for high-level anti-aircraft defence and largely intended as a replacement for the 5.25-inch and 4.5-inch turrets on battleships and old fleet carriers. The rapid-fire automatic twin 3-inch and 6-inch were designed on a post-war philosophy that the first 20 seconds of anti-jet aircraft and anti-missile engagement were critical and that the twin 3-inch firing at 240 rounds per minute would successfully engage six air targets in 20-second bursts. Sustained fire capability for naval gunfire support of ground forces (NGS) was not a design requirement. The automatic twin 6-inch guns for the secondary role of defence of and attack on trade also had some very high level (up to 8-mile altitude) anti-aircraft capability. In historical terms it represented a light armament and similar US weapons introduced on USS Worcester had experienced considerable problems with jamming and had performed below expectation. A third lower-cost option of fitting two Mk XXIV turrets in 'A' and 'B' positions, two semi-automatic Mk 6 twin 4.5-inch (Note: as used on Daring-class) in 'X' and 'Y' positions and a twin (Mark VI) or single (Mark V) 4.5-inch on each flank was considered at the start of the Korean War. This could not have been completed before 1953 as an immediate surface fighting response to a Soviet Sverdlov-class cruiser and would have required a crew of 900+. Further the RN 4.5-inch DP gun was not a good postwar AA weapon., the six Mk 24 DC-powered turrets were unfinished and complex (with two pairs of Type 274 and Type 275 directors (Note: The first reliable British produced 275M directors were fitted in 1956, in Royalist and in Type 12 frigates, 14 years after the introduction of the US Mk 37 DCT. and UK needed US-supplied and paid for directors)) DC wiring had been removed from the Tiger class in 1948 and so the Mk 24 was not suitable for fast completion of the class. There was a strong desire that the new cruisers should have AC power, not DC or dual systems.

There was great doubt of the merits of completing the Tigers, given that Soviet Tupolev Tu-95 "Bear" turboprop and Tupolev Tu-16 "Badger" jet bombers flew faster and higher than anticipated which added to the argument for missile equipped-ships for anti-aircraft defence. The Sverdlov class with 6.9-inch thick armour, speed and range also outclassed the Tigers. Even six-inch bombardment was increasingly unacceptable to the Royal Navy after Korea and was allowed only on the first day of Operation Musketeer after strong political opposition. The RN staff were completely divided over the development of new AA guns larger than 4-inch post war. Charles Lillicrap, the Director of Naval Construction in 1946, saw the new automatic 3-inch/70 as eliminating the need for the new Mk 26 DP 6-inch guns, as the guns fulfilled the AA requirement. That and the fact the new twin 3-inch/70 and twin Mk 26 6-inch were six years from being tested led to both Tigers and Minotaurs being suspended in 1947 and slowed work on the new 6-inch (and proposed new 5-inch) guns. The proven Mk 23 seemed more than adequate and its efficiency was improved in the 1950s. (Note: The Naval Battle of Guadalcanal action against Japanese cruisers suggested that manually operated 6-inch triples at low elevation could sustain high rates of fire of 8–10 rounds per minute in combat situation. HMS Bermuda in 1960 achieved 12 rounds per minute at low elevation at close range and with higher barrel-wear. The USN maintained the similar Cleveland class triple 6-inch turret on its post-war missile conversions, including USS Galveston, which maintained half its original 6- and 5-inch armament with twin RIM-8 Talos surface-to-air missile launchers and was more capable than HMS Tiger.)

=== Revised design ===
In 1954 construction of the three ships was approved to the 1948 design mounting new automatic 6-inch and 3-inch guns. Against the apparent Soviet threat of Sverdlov cruisers acting as raiders against merchant vessels, the Tigers lacked the range and armament to challenge the Soviet ships, on paper. Cruisers were better deterred and sunk by aircraft carriers operating Hawker Sea Hawk and de Havilland Sea Venom strike aircraft. (Note: Australia had HMAS Melbourne with Sea Venoms, Canada HMCS Bonaventure with McDonnell F2H Banshee fighters and India had INS Vikrant (formerly HMS Hercules) with Sea Hawks and French Bréguet 1050 Alizé - all three were wartime 1942 Design Light Fleet Carriers built for modern jet aircraft)

The November 1954 cabinet meeting deciding the fate of the Royal Navy took six hours. Churchill was determined to limit the defence budget with a view to developing nuclear weapons and less vulnerable RAF aircraft. The completion of the Tigers was approved in July 1954 with them now seen as "escort and anti-aircraft support for convoys and carrier task groups", the Royal Navy estimating completion in three years for £6 million each compared with five years and £12m for a new cruiser design. The new automatic twin 6-inch and twin 3-inch dual-purpose guns were approved for production. The modernised Tigers were an interim measure with the expectation that guided missile equipped ships were "at least ten years away". The 1957 Defence White Paper under Duncan Sandys proposed to reduce the number of large ships in the RN fleet; the Tigers, Swiftsure and Superb (Note: modernisation of Superb was cancelled that year and it was decommissioned in November 1957. Superb received a refit from January 1955 to April 1956 to be available for the Suez operation. The reconstruction of Swiftsure as a fourth Tiger was structurally complete by June 1959 but its new armament had been sold to the Royal Canadian Navy (RCN) and Chile, and it was not worth fitting recycled 4-inch and 40 mm armament. Swiftsure was scrapped in 1962 after numerous RN proposals to convert it to a missile cruiser or helicopter carrier. Converting into a small flat-deck aircraft carrier was considered.) would enter service as interim anti-aircraft ships, until the County-class destroyers were commissioned and the two Second World War cruisers, HMS Belfast and HMS Bermuda were mothballed.

== Initial service ==
The reconstruction involved the stripping out of the superstructure and most of the services. Equipment was replaced or modified to operate on AC electrical power. Tiger was completed in Jan 1959, Lion (formerly Defence) in 1960 and Blake in March 1961. Actual costs were £13 to 15 million per ship, partly due to inflation.

While outwardly identical, the three Tigers were each very different in their electrics. Blake was essentially an experimental ship with all-electric turrets able to engage Mach 2.5 air targets but was put in reserve in 1963 for lack of technical staff. Lion had deteriorated after eight years in Gareloch before reconstruction and had to be withdrawn from operations "East of Suez" in 1963 due to boiler, mechanical and armament problems. While the electric 3-inch/70 AA systems were excellent they required intensive maintenance and excessive manpower and fitters, the twin Mk 26 6-inch automatic guns were a 'disaster' constantly jamming and rarely fulfilling their basic 30 second burst fire min capability HMNZS Royalist, with some Royal Navy crew, was reactivated as a surface escort for carrier groups in Southeast Asia in 1964 to deter the threat of the Sverdlov cruiser bought by Indonesia and in 1965 to support the amphibious carriers with air defence and general fleet support. By 1966 Royalist, like Blake and Lion, was unsustainable in the last year of the Indonesia-Malaya confrontation. The large Darings were refitted (from 1961) with MRS3 fire-control to provide a substitute for the Tigers; their three turrets giving them an advantage over the Tiger.

In early December 1966, Tiger hosted an abortive series of meetings between the prime minister, Harold Wilson and Ian Smith, prime minister of Rhodesia after the latter's unilateral declaration of independence. The two men boarded the ship while she was anchored in Algeciras Bay. Tiger then sailed eastwards into the Mediterranean, returning at the end of the week to Gibraltar where both men disembarked to return to their respective countries.

== Conversions ==
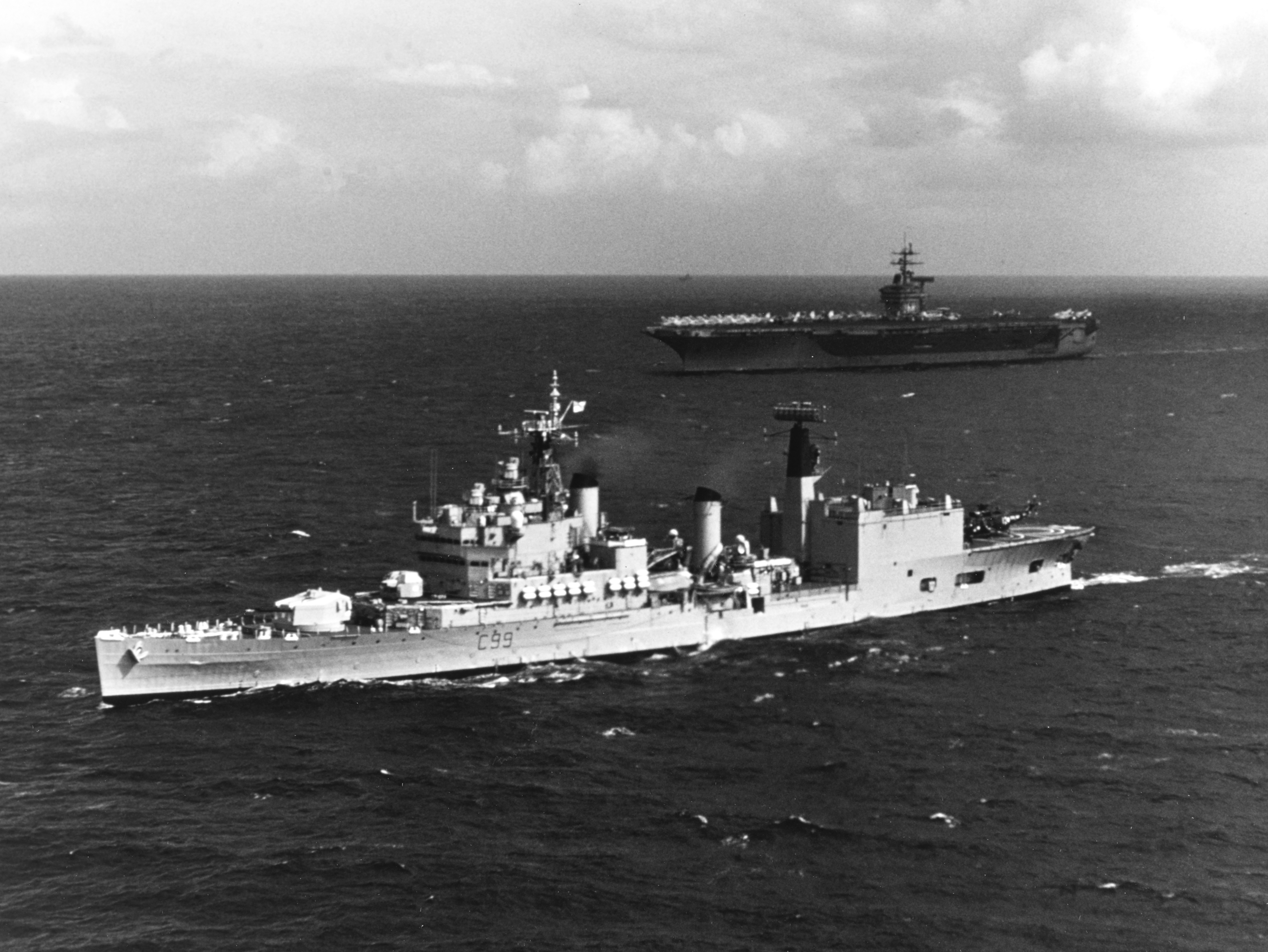
Blake operating in the English Channel with USS Nimitz in 1975

By 1964 the Conservative Government and half the naval staff saw the Tigers as no longer affordable or credible in the surface combat or fleet air defence role and would have preferred to decommission them but given they were technically only three years old and built at immense expense, scrapping them was politically difficult.

There were financial pressures in the RN due to the cost of the planned CVA-01 aircraft carriers and the Escort Cruiser programme (four helicopter carrier vessels each armed with Sea Dart anti-aircraft and Ikara anti-submarine weapons operating four "Chinook type" helicopters and having emergency accommodation for 700 troops). Cancellation of the last four of the ten planned County-class guided missile destroyers (Note: In practice only two of the ten were cancelled) and moving two or three of the Tigers to operational reserve would offset the Escort cruiser cost and replacing the Tigers or fully funded the more 'conventional cruisers, intended as replacement ships in 1960 (a) modified versions of the County-class built to the same hull dimensions and armament without Seaslug, to carry 4-6 Wessex helicopters or (b) the variant models of the Counties proposed by the RAN or (3) An enlarged version of the County design built to cruiser standards with additional workshops, parts and stores carried and some armour protection with provision for three Wessex and the American Tartar system. However, the decision to build Britain's nuclear missile submarines meant the Escort cruisers proposal was postponed, with budget pressure and the fact both the available Vickers design teams and the navy's own available naval architects were now employed on the nuclear submarines. (Note: there was also division over whether the Escort cruisers would be small helicopter carrier cruisers or developed Type 82 destroyers for operation East of Suez) Though the escort cruisers were deferred, the requirement remained and conversion of the Tigers was identified as the quickest solution in 1963. Conversion into helicopter carriers carrying Westland Wessex helicopters for Royal Marine Commando or anti-submarine work East of Suez was approved on 24 January 1964.

A large hangar replaced the 'Y' turret, the forward turrets were retained for shore bombardment and anti-surface vessel work. Intended to provide extra powerful vessels to support and conduct amphibious operations east of Suez where it was difficult logistically for the Royal Navy to sustain even one operational carrier and one commando carrier in 1963–64. The original plan retained the three twin 3-inch mounts with an updated sonar and radar including Type 965 and replacing the Type 992 target indicator radar with the Type 993. British Army preference in 1964 with the Indonesian confrontation building was to retain the Tigers with their 6-inch guns for shore bombardment.

Three configurations (schemes X, Y, and Z) were considered in 1965 for the conversion to helicopter carriers. X had deck space for one helicopter and a hangar for three at the cost of the rear 6-inch turret and no maintenance space, Y gave deck space for two Wessex helicopters (only one landing or taking off at a time) and hangar for four at the cost of removing the 6-inch and 3-inch armament aft, Z was same deck space and hangar capacity as Y but two helicopters could take off (or land) at once with 6-inch and 3-inch mounts removed. Z was chosen as the best option even for a projected six-year lifespan and expected to take 15 months and cost £2 million per ship. The work would take place at the same time as refit - predicted as 15 months. The final cost was £12 million for all three (conversion and refit) and £10.5 million for the helicopters. It was recognised that 75 pilots would also be needed at a time when the FAA was already 37 pilots short.

To avoid the political problem of scrapping new cruisers as well as the aircraft carriers, the Labour Government elected in October 1964 decided to retain large ships for command and flagship roles and accepted the RN and MoD argument that three Tiger cruisers would replace the anti-submarine warfare role previously provided by aircraft carriers. At the time the Royal Navy was mostly concentrated on east of Suez operations and the anti-submarine deterrent role was to counter slow Indonesian and Chinese diesel-powered submarines. In theory, even one Tiger could threaten the use of nuclear depth charges and free up space on aircraft carriers for strike and air combat aircraft.

The government continued the conversion of Tiger and Blake after deciding on further ship cuts and a faster phase-out of carriers in 1968. During the conversion of Blake, the plan was changed to allow the cruisers to operate four more capable Westland Sea King helicopters, although only three Sea Kings could actually ever be accommodated and serviced in the new longer hangar, which forced the replacement of the side 3-inch gun mounts with less effective Seacat guided weapon system. The low priority given to deterrence of Soviet submarines in the Northern Atlantic by the MoD is reflected in the decision to convert a suitable anti-submarine helicopter platform, the carrier Hermes into an amphibious carrier ("commando carrier"). (Note: Hermes added anti-submarine helicopter capabilities in 1977) The later advent of the Invincible-class aircraft carriers would seem to add weight to this proposal. Hermes and Bulwark were larger, and offered more hangar capacity. The government's priority was to arm aircraft in West Germany with tactical and thermonuclear weapons. Provision of nuclear depth charges for anti-submarine, aircraft carriers, destroyers and frigates was limited, although approval for Leander, Rothesay and County class ships for triggering Nuclear depth bombs was given in 1969 and these ships offered quieter listening platforms than the Tigers.

The proposed class of four large Type 82 destroyers (planned to accompany the CVA-01 aircraft carriers) fitted with nuclear Ikara anti-submarine missiles could have been a more reliable nuclear deterrent, but the Ikara was ultimately fitted only to carry conventional Mark 46 torpedoes and due to the 1966 Defence White Paper only one Type 82 air defence destroyer, HMS Bristol, was built as a testbed for the weapon technologies. Bristol lacked a helicopter hangar, and was plagued by problems common with dated and complex steam propulsion.

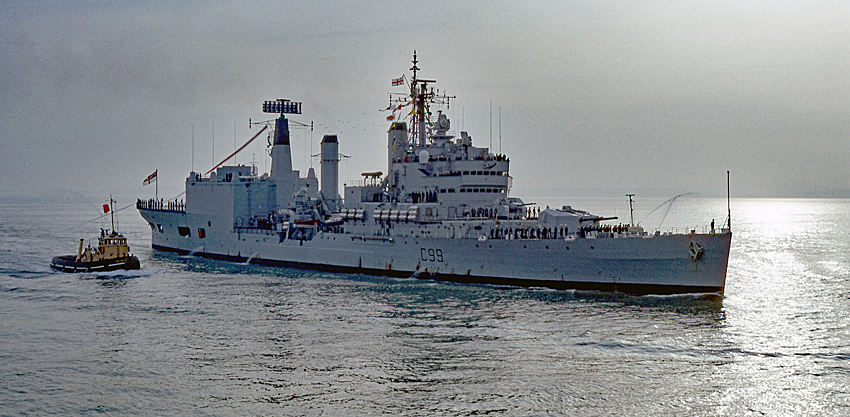
HMS Blake approaching Portsmouh to pay off for the last time

With no other options, work began to convert Blake to a helicopter cruiser in 1965 and Tiger in 1968. The structural modernisation work on the hulls was difficult and expensive. However, the ships successfully served as helicopter command cruisers and provided an argument to justify the construction of their replacement, the Invincible-class "through deck cruisers". Lion's conversion was cancelled due to delays and other workload in the dockyards. By 1969, it was obvious that Blake's conversion was unsatisfactory. Lion remained operational until late 1965, when she was placed in reserve and used as a parts source for the conversion of Tiger and she was sold for breaking up in 1975. The conversions left Tiger and Blake some 380 tons heavier with a full displacement of 12,080 tons and their crew complements increased by 169 to 885. Originally. Blake's conversion had been more expensive than envisaged (£5.5 million) and Tiger's £13.25 million, due to the level of inflation at the time.

== Obsolescence and decommissioning ==
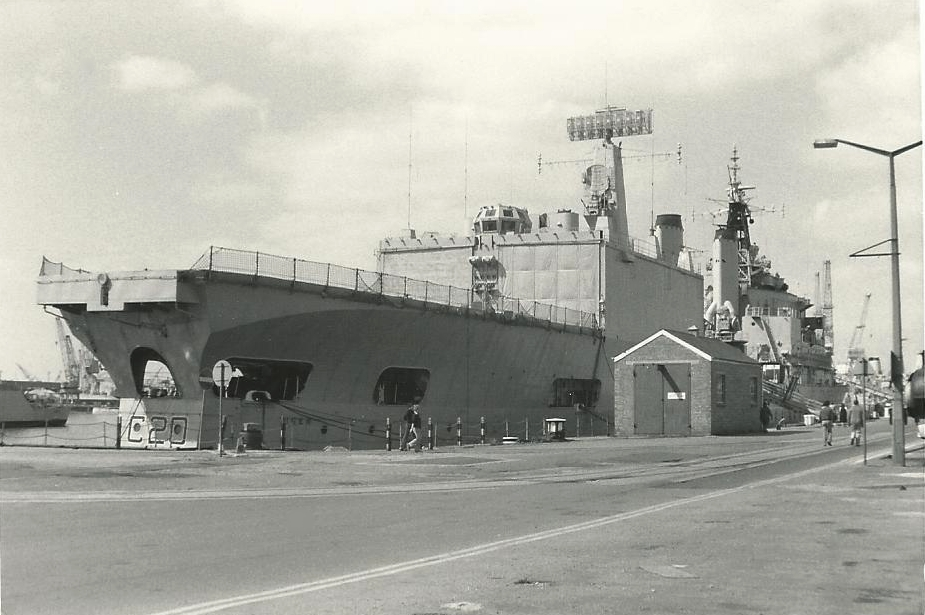
The decommissioned HMS Tiger at Portsmouth Navy Days in 1980, showing the helicopter deck and hangar

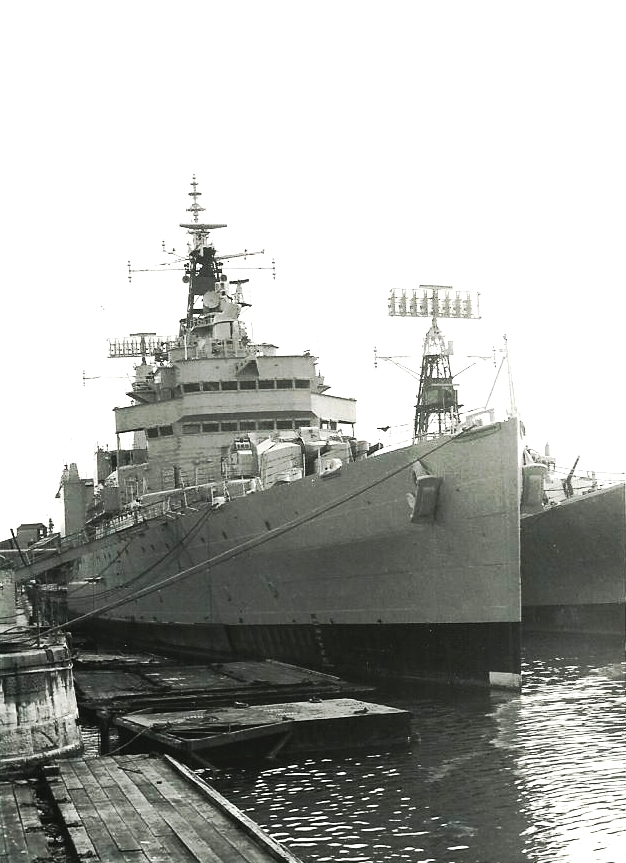
HMS Tiger on the same day, showing the forward 6-inch guns which were retained in the conversion.

Blake returned to service in 1969 and Tiger in 1972. Lion was used for spares for both of them before she was sold off and scrapped in 1975 by Thos. W. Ward at Inverkeithing. Cutbacks in Royal Navy funding and manpower, under the new Conservative government and the belief in the Hawker Siddeley Nimrod maritime patrol aircraft and submarines for anti-submarine operations, reduced the need for the class. The recommissioning of the carrier Bulwark and conversion of Hermes into a helicopter carrier, then into an anti-submarine carrier meant that they could carry twice as many Sea Kings as the Tigers further decreased their importance. In April 1978, Tiger was withdrawn from service, followed by Blake in 1979; both ships were laid up in reserve at Chatham Dockyard. When Blake was decommissioned in 1979, she was the last cruiser to serve in the Royal Navy and her passing was marked on 6 December 1979 when she fired her main guns for the last time in the English Channel.

During the Falklands War, Blake and Tiger were surveyed to determine their condition for reactivation. The survey determined both ships to be in good condition and they were put into dry-dock, Blake at Chatham, Tiger at Portsmouth. By mid-May, it was determined that the ships would not be completed in time to take part in the war and work ceased.

Chile showed interest in acquiring both ships, the sale did not proceed and the ships sat at anchor. Blake was sold for breaking up at the end of August 1982 and Tiger arrived at the breakers in Spain in September 1986.

== Ships of the class ==
Pennant	Name	(a) Hull builder (b) Main machinery manufacturers	Laid down	Launched	Accepted into service	Commissioned	Decommissioned	Estimated building cost (Note: "Unit cost, i.e. excluding cost of certain items (e.g. aircraft, First Outfits).")
C20	Tiger (ex-Bellerophon)	(a) & (b) John Brown and Co Ltd, Clydebank.	1 October 1941	25 October 1945	March 1959	18 March 1959	20 April 1978	£12,820,000
C34	Lion (ex-Defence)	(a) Scotts Shipbuilding & Engineering Co Ltd, Greenock (to launching stage) (a) Swan Hunter & Wigham Richardson Wallsend-on-Tyne (for completion).	24 June 1942	2 September 1944	July 1960	20 July 1960	December 1972	£14,375,000
C99	Blake (ex-Tiger, ex-Blake)	(a) & (b) Fairfield Shipbuilding and Engineering Company Govan, Glasgow.	17 August 1942	20 December 1945	March 1961	8 March 1961	December 1979	£14,940,000
