= Minotaur-class cruiser (1943) =

Class of British light cruisers

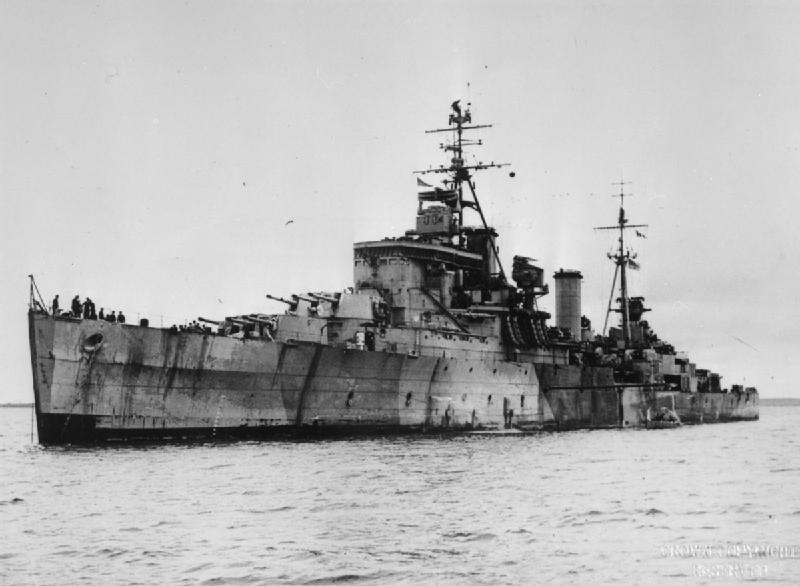
- HMS Swiftsure

Class overview
- Name: Minotaur class
- Builders: Harland and Wolff; Swan Hunter; Vickers-Armstrongs
- Operators: Royal Navy; Royal Canadian Navy
- Preceded by: Fiji class
- Succeeded by: Neptune class (planned) Tiger class (actual)
- Built: 1941–1945
- In commission: 1944–1958
- Planned: 9
- Completed: 3
- Cancelled: 6
- Scrapped: 3 (3 other early-stage Minotaur hulls became the Tiger class)

General characteristics
- Type: Light cruiser
- Displacement: 8,800 tons standard; 11,130 tons full; (Superb: 8,885 tons standard; 11,560 tons full)
- Length: 555.5 ft (169.3 m)
- Beam: 63 ft (19 m) (Superb: 64 ft (20 m))
- Draught: 17.25 ft (5.26 m)
- Installed power: 72,500 shp (54.1 MW)
- Propulsion: Four Admiralty-type three drum boilers; Four shaft Parsons steam turbines
- Speed: 31.5 knots (58.3 km/h)
- Range: 2,000 nautical miles (3,700 km) at 30 knots (60 km/h); 8,000 nautical miles (15,000 km) at 16 knots (30 km/h); 1,850 tons fuel oil
- Complement: 867
- Armament: 3 × triple BL 6-inch Mk XXIII guns (152.4 mm); 5 × dual 4-inch/45 QF Mk 16 HA guns; 4 × quad QF 2 pdr guns; 6 × single 40 mm anti-aircraft guns; 2 × triple 21-inch (533 mm) torpedo tubes.
- Armour: 3.25–3.5-inch (83–89 mm) belt; 2-inch (51 mm) deck; 1–2-inch (25–51 mm) turrets; 1.5–2-inch (38–51 mm) bulkheads

The Minotaur class, also known as the Swiftsure class after the lead ship was sold to Canada and renamed, were a group of light cruisers of the British Royal Navy built during the Second World War. They were designed as a modified version of the Fiji class incorporating war modifications and authorised in 1941. However, in spite of the heavy toll of cruisers in that year and the following one, the building of this new class had a relatively low priority and only three of the planned twelve were completed by end of World War II. They played no significant part in the Second World War, though Swiftsure, as flagship of the British Pacific Cruiser Squadron, was selected by Admiral Cecil Harcourt to hoist his flag for the Japanese surrender at Hong Kong.

Superb was completed to a slightly different design than the first two ships, work on another three was cancelled and the last three were eventually built to a different design as the Tiger class.

== Design ==
The class was originally to have consisted of twelve ships, six were laid down in 1941–1942 and the seventh unit, Hawke, in 1943. Four of the ordered cruisers were cancelled almost immediately, three in March 1942 being replaced by the first light fleet carrier order (Note: which used half the Fiji/Swiftsure 80,000 shp (60,000 kW) power train in split form) and another, probably Mars, was cancelled in November 1942. An eighth cruiser, Bellerophon, started in early 1944, and then stopped and cancelled; its already constructed boilers and turbines were installed in the light fleet carriers Colossus and Perseus (ex Edgar) being constructed in the same Vickers Armstrong yard as Bellerophon had been started. It appears Bellerophon was then reordered as a Neptune-class cruiser. but by the end of World War II only Minotaur, Swiftsure, and Superb were complete, whilst the others were laid up. Minotaur was transferred to the Royal Canadian Navy and renamed Ontario. While the basic specifications and original armament were only a slight enlargement of the Fiji class with an extra twin 4-inch turret, the Minotaurs did represent a substantial advance towards more sophisticated weapon control and integration of command and control and Action Information Office and developments towards operation room control of fighting ships. By 1944 the seven Minotaurs under construction represented four distinct groups, which were so significantly different that they could probably be regarded as four separate classes of cruiser. Swiftsure introduced the reliable Type 274 lock-and-follow radar, which increased the accuracy of the main armament to get on target quickly. The second Superb extended this more advanced radar with the addition of Type 275 for anti-aircraft fire control, although Superb's version lacked the flyplane or the accurate finishing in the version fitted to later Battle-class destroyers. The third group of Minotaurs, the Tigers, were being built from quite early in their evolution with a different main battery consisting of three triple Mk 24 6-inch turrets, which were dual purpose, elevating to 60 degrees, and which automatically tracked and followed targets under Type 274/275 radar control. These guns and those for Hawke, the fourth Tiger, were nearly complete by late 1946 and were stored at Rosyth until the late 1950s as alternatives to the Mk 26 automatic twin 6-inch guns that were eventually fitted. Hawke represented a further development, surprisingly scrapped on the slip in late 1945, with its boilers and machinery complete, and its guns nearly finished.

Three of the laid-up vessels were completed in the 1960s as Tiger-class cruisers. Two were given helicopter facilities and anti-aircraft missile systems to become "helicopter and command cruisers" during the 1970s.

== Modifications ==
Swiftsure was completed with sixteen twin and six single 20 mm guns, but had all the singles and eight of the twins removed in the summer of 1945, when she received, in lieu, eight 40 mm Bofors and five single 40 mm Bofors Mk III. HMCS Ontario (ex-Minotaur) was completed with the same close-range outfit as Swiftsure, and is reported to have had an outfit of six 40 mm and six 20 mm guns at the end of the war, all in single mountings. Superb was not completed until after the end of hostilities, and had a close-range outfit consisting of eight single 40 mm Mk III, two single 2-pounders, four twin hand-operated 20 mm and two single 20 mm guns.

After a collision between Swiftsure and the destroyer Diamond in the West Indies on 16 September 1953, Swiftsure was largely rebuilt to the pattern of the reconstruction of Belfast in 1956–59. The work on Swiftsure was largely completed but it was placed in reserve rather than fitted out with the only available armament, which was its original and labour-intensive triple 6-inch guns, two twin 4-inch guns, and a pair of L/60 Bofors which would have been controlled by a six-channel MRS8 US supplied fire control system. The 1953 plan to modernize the ship with the new twin 3-inch 70 calibre guns was rejected around 1954 because Swiftsure′s beam of 63 feet (19 m) did not allow enough space, and the cost of a full reconstruction of Superb as a fourth Tiger with full new armament was considered too expensive. The new 70 calibre twin 3-inch mounts were experimental, and it was far from clear that they would ever be reliable enough to be effective. A more limited update of the Swiftsure and Superb with new L/70 Bofors firing proximity fused shells was approved and then cancelled, because the time and cost of Swiftsure′s modernisation was proving too great and the necessary conversion from DC to AC power was considered too expensive on half-life ships. Options of the Type 965 radar on its new lattice mast and a data link were considered. The cost of finishing the Tiger-class cruisers (£35 million) was a major political issue, as was the new automatic guns jamming. The jamming issue was partly rectified by 1958, but only after inflicting terminal damage to the credibility of the project. The completion of Lion and Blake was in real danger of being stopped in early 1960, and automatic gun cruisers were considered obsolete in the United States and the Soviet Union. Problems with cracking that occurred in the update of Swiftsure as a result of the collision with the destroyer Diamond slowed the refit, raised costs, and made recommissioning at the same time as Belfast impossible. (Note: Swiftsure's refit was started in February 1956 with planned conclusion of December 1959.) Re-entering service in 1960 with only Second World War-era cruiser weapons was too expensive, but there were no suitable modern weapons to fit. About £1 million was spent on the Swiftsure 'reconstruction' project by 1961, "under a half" of that on new construction. In 1959–60, the Royal Navy fought hard to retain Swiftsure as a new modernization pattern of a cruiser - helicopter carrier. This design was largely implemented a decade later on its half-sisters Tiger and Blake. This was intended to allow more space on carriers for fighters and strike aircraft.

== Ships ==
Construction data
Name	Pennant	Builder	Laid down	Launched	Commissioned	Fate
Minotaur	53	Harland & Wolff	20 November 1941	29 July 1943	—N/a	Transferred to Royal Canadian Navy July 1944 commissioning on 25 May 1945 as HMCS Ontario. Broken up at Osaka, 1960
Swiftsure	08	Vickers-Armstrongs	22 September 1941	4 February 1943	22 June 1944	Broken up at Inverkeithing, 1962
Superb	25	Swan Hunter	23 June 1942	31 August 1943	16 November 1945	Broken up at Dalmuir, 1960
Hawke	27	HM Dockyard, Portsmouth	1 July 1943	—N/a	—N/a	Cancelled March 1946; broken up on slipway
Bellerophon (ex-Tiger, ex-Blake)	50	Vickers-Armstrongs	August 1944	—N/a	—N/a	Cancelled 1946; broken up on slipway
Blake (ex-Tiger)		Fairfield	17 August 1942	20 December 1945		Redesigned and built as the Tiger-class cruisers
Defence		Scotts	24 June 1942	2 September 1944		Redesigned and built as the Tiger-class cruisers
Bellerophon (ex-Blake)		John Brown	1 October 1941	25 October 1945		Redesigned and built as the Tiger-class cruisers
Mars						Cancelled 1946
