= 3-inch/70-caliber Mark 26 gun =

3 Inch / 70 Mark 26
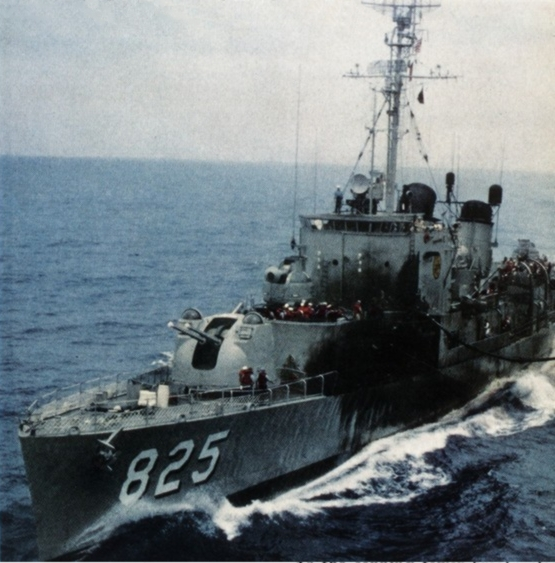
- 3"/70 turret on USS Carpenter in 1962
- Type: Anti-aircraft gun
- Place of origin: United States and United Kingdom

Service history
- In service: 1957–1998
- Used by: United States Navy; Royal Navy; Royal Canadian Navy

Production history
- Designed: 1945-1956
- Produced: 1957

Specifications
- Mass: 2,650 lb (1,202 kg)
- Barrel length: 210 inches (5.3 m) bore (70 calibres)
- Shell: AA
- Caliber: 3-inch (76.20 mm)
- Recoil: 15.62 inches (40 cm)
- Elevation: -15 to 90 degrees
- Rate of fire: 90-100 rpm
- Muzzle velocity: 3,400 feet per second (1,000 m/s)
- Maximum firing range: 19,500 yards (17,830 m)

The 3"/70 Mark 26 Gun was a US post war naval anti-aircraft gun. Developed as a joint project with the United Kingdom, which called it the QF 3-inch Mark N1 gun, it had a water-cooled barrel combined with an automatic loader to deliver high rates of fire.

The gun design was based on experience defending United States warships from Japanese kamikaze attacks in World War II and based on the 3-inch/50 caliber gun. The name indicates in US Navy terminology that this piece of naval artillery fires a projectile 3 in (76 mm) in diameter and has a barrel length of 70 calibers [barrel length = 3" × 70 = 210 in (18 ft; 5.3 m)]. "Mark 26" refers to the gun mounting rather than the gun itself.

Due to the long development period, the gun did not enter service until 1957 and the mounts proved problematic; the gun was removed from most US warships after a short service life, being fully retired by 1970.

The British mountings, known as Mark 6 in the Royal Navy, were to a different design and though also complex and subject to feed problems were more effective.

== History ==
Development of the 3"/70 Mark 26 gun began from observations by the US Navy that the Oerlikon 20 mm cannon and the Bofors 40 mm anti-aircraft guns were too small to 'kill-stop' Japanese kamikaze aircraft. As a joint project between the United States and the United Kingdom, its design being finalized in 1956, the Mark 26 missed any wartime action. It was an essential improvement over the previous version, the 3-inch/50-caliber Marks 27, 33, and 34, increasing the barrel length by 60 in (1.5 m) and improving range by over 5,000 ft (1,500 m) and elevation by 5 degrees. The 3-inch round was chosen because it was the smallest caliber ammunition that could be fitted with a VT radar proximity fuze. The twin barrel mount was believed to be more effective against faster aircraft and guided missiles than the single mounted 5"/54 caliber Mark 42 gun, hence, the single barrel version of the Mark 26 never saw service use.

== Versions ==
The Mark 26 was the last of four versions of the 3"/50 caliber AA (anti-aircraft) artillery. The Mark 23 was the initial prototype on USS Carpenter to test the fully automatic firing of the artillery. The next version (Mark 24) was exactly the same despite an overall weight loss of the actual gun. The Mark 25's improvement was based on a rapid-fire horizontal-wedge breech. The final, and service ready, version incorporated all of these improvements (with the exception of being much heavier than the Mark 24 version) as well as a water cooled monoblock system with a horizontally sliding breech mechanism.

The British mounting for the guns built by Vickers was the twin 3-inch/70 Mark 6. This was used on the British Tiger-class cruisers (three mountings, one fore and two broadside and Canadian Restigouche-class and Mackenzie-class destroyer escorts (one mounting forward). The mounting could elevate to 90° at 30° per second and train at 60° per second.

== Ammunition ==
| | US | UK |
|---|---|---|
| Type | AA Mark 34 Mod 1 | HE Fuze NC101 |
| Shell weight | 15 lbs. (6.8 kg) | 15 lb (6.8 kg) |
| Cartridge | 76.2 mm x 669R (Mark 10) | 76.2 mm x 662R |
| Propellant charge | 11.2 lb (5.1 kg) SPD | 11.2 lb (5.1 kg) |
| Overall weight | 36.2 lbs (16.4 kg) | 36 lb (16 kg) |
| Muzzle velocity | 3,400 ft/s (1,000 m/s) | 3,400 ft/s (1,000 m/s) |
| Barrel Life | approx 2,050 rounds | N/A |
| Range | 19,500 yards (17,830 meters) at 45 degrees elevation | 19,500 yards (17,830 meters) at 45 degrees elevation |
| AA Ceiling | 38,000 feet (11,580 meters) | 38,000 feet (11,580 meters) |

The ammunition used in the Mark 26 is heavier than its earlier 3-inch rounds used by the US Navy. Although it was a joint project by the United States and the United Kingdom, the two countries used cartridges that differed slightly.

The UK also had a non-fragmenting round for practice and an inert training round.

== Usage ==
- Mark 37 (American mount)
  - USS Carpenter (DDE-825), USS Robert A. Owens (DDE-827)
  - USS Norfolk (DL-1)
  - Mitscher-class destroyer
  - USS Northampton (CLC-1)
  - CL-154-class cruiser (canceled)
  - USS United States (CVA-58) (canceled)
- Mark 6 (British mount)
  - HMS Cumberland (57) (prototype)
  - Minotaur-class cruiser (1947) (canceled)
  - Tiger-class cruiser
  - Restigouche-class destroyer
  - Mackenzie-class destroyer
