= HMS Ceylon (30) =

Fiji-class cruiser

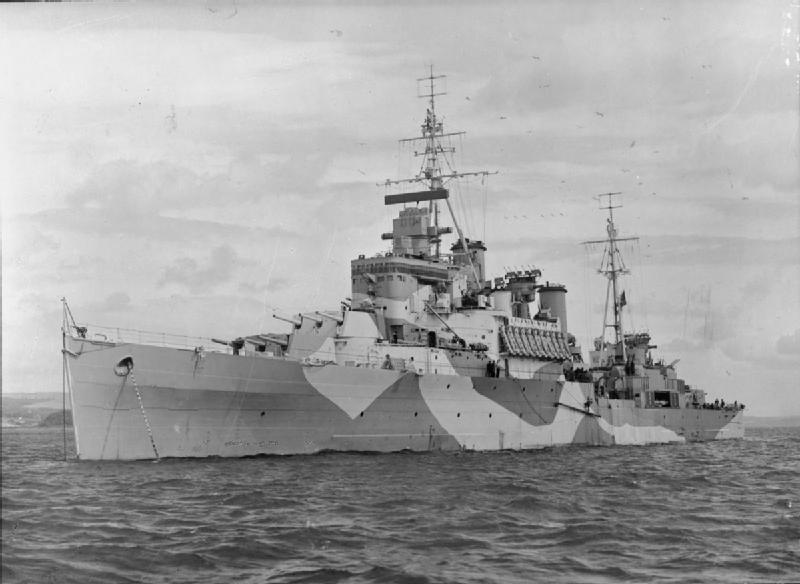
- Ceylon at anchor in August 1943

History

United Kingdom
- Name: Ceylon
- Namesake: Island of Ceylon and its Dependencies (now Sri Lanka)
- Builder: Alexander Stephen and Sons, Govan
- Laid down: 27 April 1939
- Launched: 30 July 1942
- Commissioned: 13 July 1943
- Identification: Pennant number: 30
- Fate: Transferred to Peruvian Navy, 9 February 1960

Peru
- Name: BAP Coronel Bolognesi
- Acquired: 9 February 1960
- Decommissioned: May 1982
- Fate: Scrapped, August 1985

General characteristics
- Class & type: Fiji-class light cruiser
- Displacement: 8,712 tons standard; 11,024 tons full load
- Length: 169.3 m (555 ft 5 in)
- Beam: 18.9 m (62 ft 0 in)
- Draught: 5.3 m (17 ft 5 in)
- Propulsion: Four oil fired three-drum Admiralty-type boilers; four-shaft geared turbines; four screws; 54.1 megawatts (72,500 shp)
- Speed: 33 knots (61 km/h; 38 mph)
- Range: 10,200 nmi (18,900 km; 11,700 mi) at 12 knots (22 km/h; 14 mph)
- Complement: 730 (wartime); 650 (peacetime)
- Sensors & processing systems: Type 281 air search; Type 272 surface search; Type 277 height finding; Type 274 fire control (6 inch guns); Type 283 fire control (4 inch guns); Type 282 fire control (2 pdr guns)
- Armament: 3 triple BL 6 inch Mk XXIII guns (152 mm); 4 twin QF 4 inch Mk XIX guns; 4 quadruple QF 2-pounder Mk VII (40 mm) "pom-pom" guns; 10 twin Oerlikon 20 mm Mk II guns; 2 triple 21 inch (533 mm) torpedo tubes
- Armour: 82.5–88.9 mm (3.25–3.50 in) belt; 25.4–50.8 mm (1.00–2.00 in) turrets
- Aircraft carried: Two Supermarine Walrus aircraft (Later removed)

HMS Ceylon was a Fiji-class light cruiser of the Royal Navy. She was of the Ceylon sub class, named after the island and British colony of Ceylon (now Sri Lanka). The cruiser saw service in the Atlantic and Pacific theatres during the Second World War. In the postwar era, she participated in actions in Egypt and the Korean War. In 1960 she transferred to the navy of Peru and renamed Coronel Bolognesi. The cruiser was scrapped in 1985.

== Service history ==
=== Wartime career ===
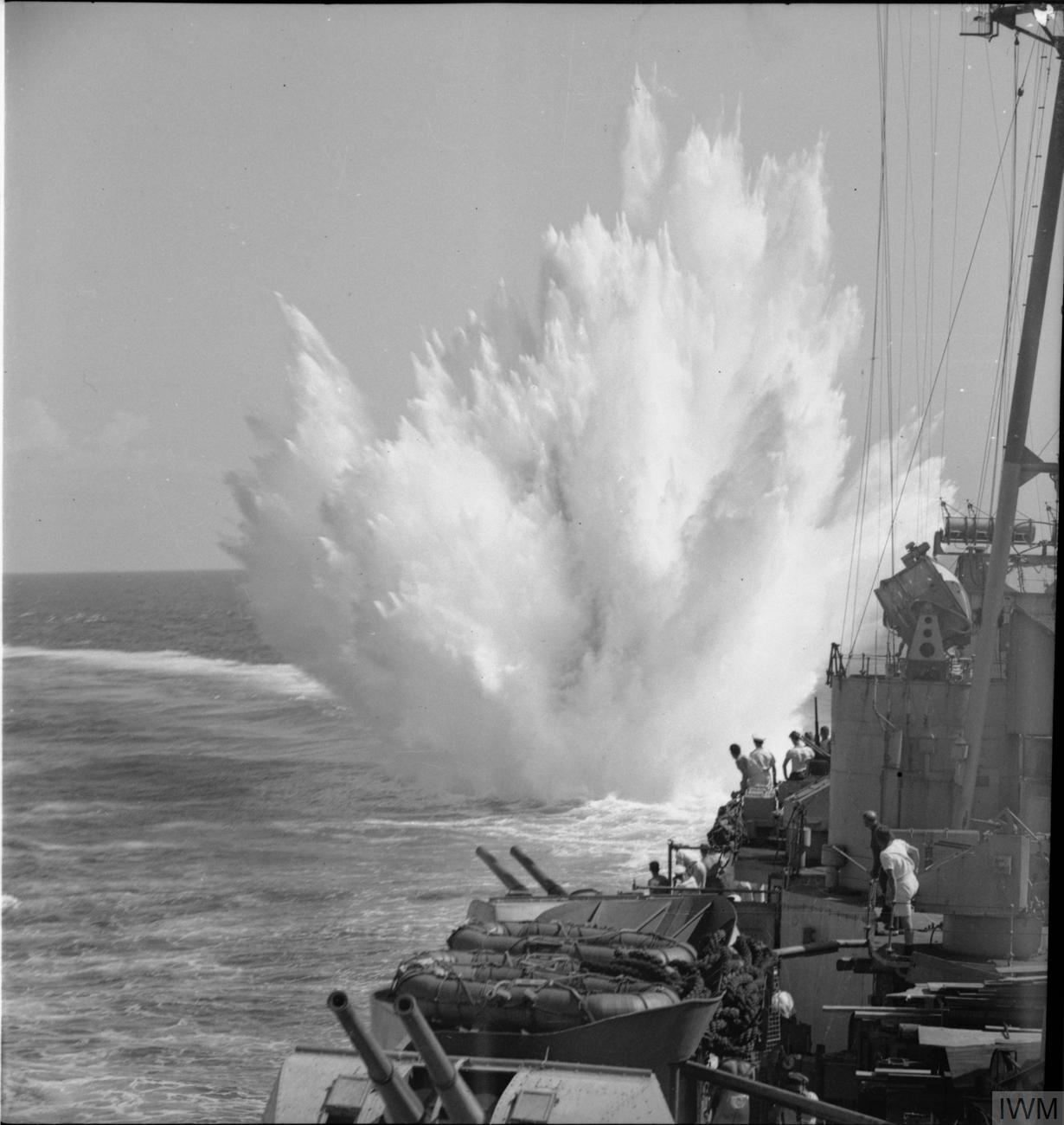
A depth charge explodes after it had been dropped from Ceylon

Built by Stephens at Govan and launched on 30 July 1942, she was completed on 13 July 1943. After two months in the Home Fleet she was transferred to the 4th Cruiser Squadron, with the Eastern Fleet and took part in many carrier raids, bombardments and patrols against Japanese-held territory, including Operations Cockpit, Meridian and Diplomat. In November 1944 she joined the British Pacific Fleet and sailed from Trincomalee on 16 January, taking part in a raid on Pankalan Bradan en route. By May 1945, however, she was back in the Indian Ocean, shelling the Nicobar Islands, and remained in that theatre until the end of the war. In October 1945 she returned to England for refit and lay-up.

=== Postwar ===
Post-war, she served in the Portsmouth Command during 1946/50, followed by the 5th and 4th Cruiser Squadrons on the Far East and East Indies stations. She was actively engaged in the Korean War, carrying out a number of bombardments.

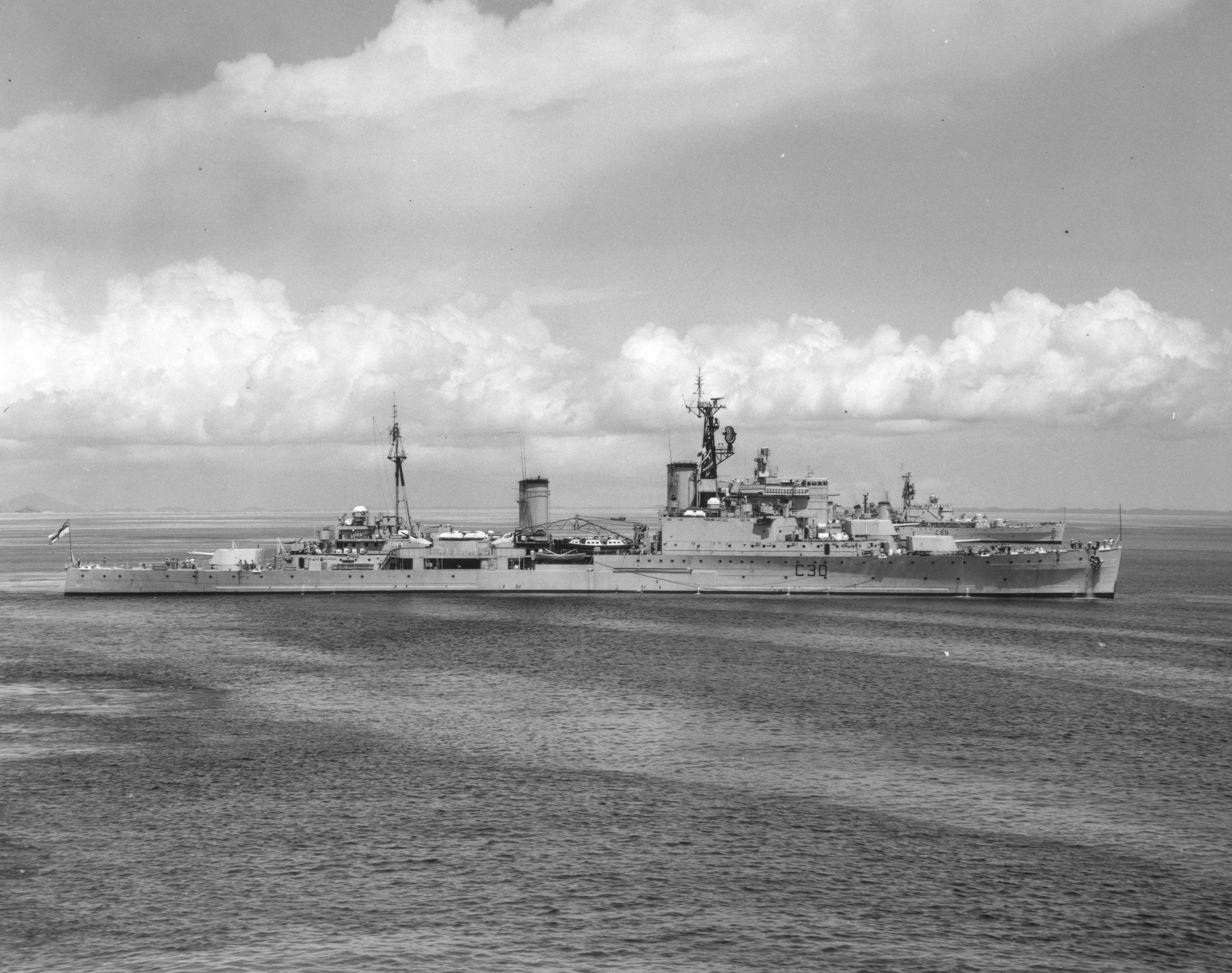
Ceylon after the Second World War

Ceylon, in poor condition, was given a major refit from March 1955 to July 1956 to suit her for further service until the Tiger-class cruisers could enter service. A Type 960 long range air warning radar replaced the existing Type 281B, while the Type 277 height finder radar was upgraded to 277Q standard and the UA-1 ESM system was fitted. Fire control for the ship's 4-inch guns was provided by US-supplied Mark 63 systems, with radar mounted on the gun mounts, while short range anti-aircraft defence was provided by an outfit of 18 Bofors 40-mm guns in five twin Mark 5 mounts and eight single Mark 7 mounts, with the Mark 5 mounts provided with Simple Tachymetric directors (STD).

After trials with the new equipment, in late 1956, Ceylon was deployed to the Mediterranean where she provided long range gunfire support to suppress Egyptian shore battery emplacements at Port Said in support of the British Army and Royal Marine landings. A Communication Officer on the cruiser describes Ceylon's bombardment as relatively brief, as the Egyptian batteries did not return fire. Later in the operation Ceylon served as an air direction picket, Royalist having been withdrawn for political reasons and the cruiser Jamaica lacking modern air warning and aircraft direction equipment. Between 1956 and 1959 she served in the Mediterranean Fleet, Home Fleet and East of Suez.

=== Peruvian service ===
On 18 December 1959, she returned to Portsmouth and was sold to Peru the same month. The disposal of the Ceylon, only three years after its modernisation, came as a shock to its last captain, Frank Twiss. On 9 February 1960, she was transferred to the Peruvian Navy and renamed Coronel Bolognesi. The sale of her and Newfoundland while the older Colony and Town cruisers – Gambia, Bermuda, Sheffield and Belfast – remained in service or reserve until the election of a Labour Government in 1964, probably reflected a good price on the sale to Peru and the need for cuts to save the Tiger class. The fact that Newfoundland and Ceylon remained in Peruvian service till the 1980s meant some crucial parts for the maintenance of the Tigers were obtained from Peru in the 1970s.

She spent over twenty years with the Peruvians until she was finally deleted from the Navy List in May 1982 and towed to Taiwan in August 1985 to be scrapped.
