= HMS Gambia =

Fiji-class cruiser

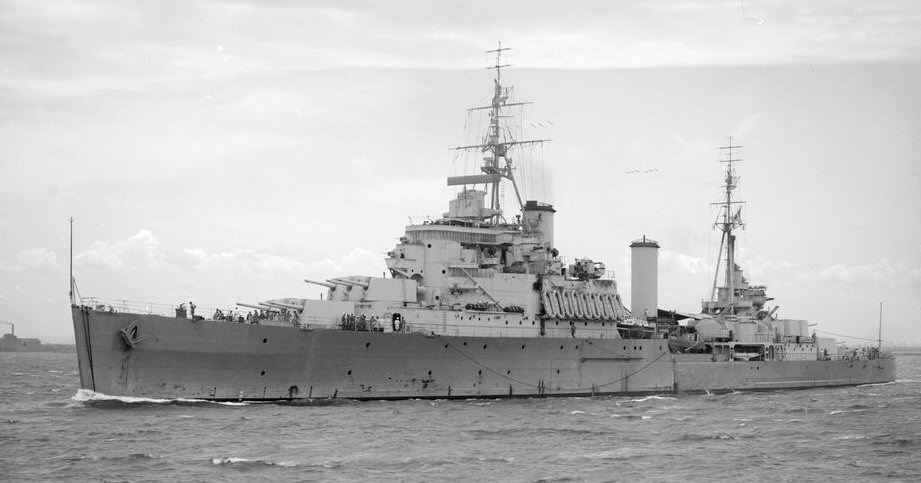
- Gambia

History

United Kingdom
- Name: Gambia
- Namesake: Gambia Colony and Protectorate
- Builder: Swan Hunter, Tyne and Wear
- Laid down: 24 July 1939
- Launched: 30 November 1940
- Commissioned: 21 February 1942
- Out of service: Transferred to the Royal New Zealand Navy, 22 September 1943
- Identification: Pennant number: 48

New Zealand
- Name: Gambia
- Commissioned: 22 September 1943
- Out of service: Returned to the Royal Navy, 27 March 1946

United Kingdom
- Name: Gambia
- Recommissioned: 1 July 1946
- Decommissioned: December 1960
- In service: Returned to the Royal Navy, 27 March 1946
- Fate: Scrapped, 5 December 1968

General characteristics (as built)
- Class & type: Fiji-class light cruiser
- Displacement: 8,631 long tons (8,770 t) (standard)
- Length: 555 ft 6 in (169.3 m)
- Beam: 62 ft (18.9 m)
- Draught: 19 ft 10 in (6 m)
- Installed power: 4 Admiralty 3-drum boilers; 80,000 shp (60,000 kW)
- Propulsion: 4 shafts; 4 geared steam turbine sets
- Speed: 32.25 knots (59.73 km/h; 37.11 mph)
- Range: 6,250 nmi (11,580 km; 7,190 mi) at 13 knots (24 km/h; 15 mph)
- Complement: 733 (peacetime), 900 (wartime)
- Armament: 4 × triple 6 in (152 mm) guns; 4 × twin 4 in (102 mm) DP guns; 2 × quadruple, 2 × single 2-pdr (40 mm (1.6 in)) AA guns; 6 × single 20 mm (0.8 in) Oerlikon AA guns; 2 × triple 21 in (533 mm) torpedo tubes
- Armour: Engine and boiler rooms: 3.25 in (83 mm); Decks: 2–3.5 in (51–89 mm); Magazines: 2–3.5 in (51–89 mm); Gun turrets: 1–2 in (25–51 mm)
- Aircraft carried: 2 × seaplanes
- Aviation facilities: 1 × catapult, 2 × hangars

HMS Gambia (pennant number 48, later C48) was a Fiji-class light cruiser of the Royal Navy. She was in the service of the Royal New Zealand Navy (RNZN) as HMNZS Gambia from 1943 to 1946. She was named after the then Crown colony of The Gambia, and has been the only ship of the Royal Navy to bear the name.

== Construction ==
Gambia was conceived in the 1938 Naval Estimates and was laid down on 24 July 1939, at Swan Hunter's Yard at Wallsend. She was launched on 30 November 1940, by Lady Hilbery and commissioned on 21 February 1942.

== Service history ==
=== Early wartime career ===
The cruiser saw active service in the East Indies with the British Eastern Fleet, and was involved in the Battle of Madagascar in September 1942. She then carried out trade protection duties in the Indian Ocean, but returned to home waters, calling at the territory of the Gambia on the way, where West African Chiefs in full regalia led thousands of their subjects to visit the ship named after their colony.

She refitted at Liverpool between June and September.

=== Royal New Zealand Navy service ===
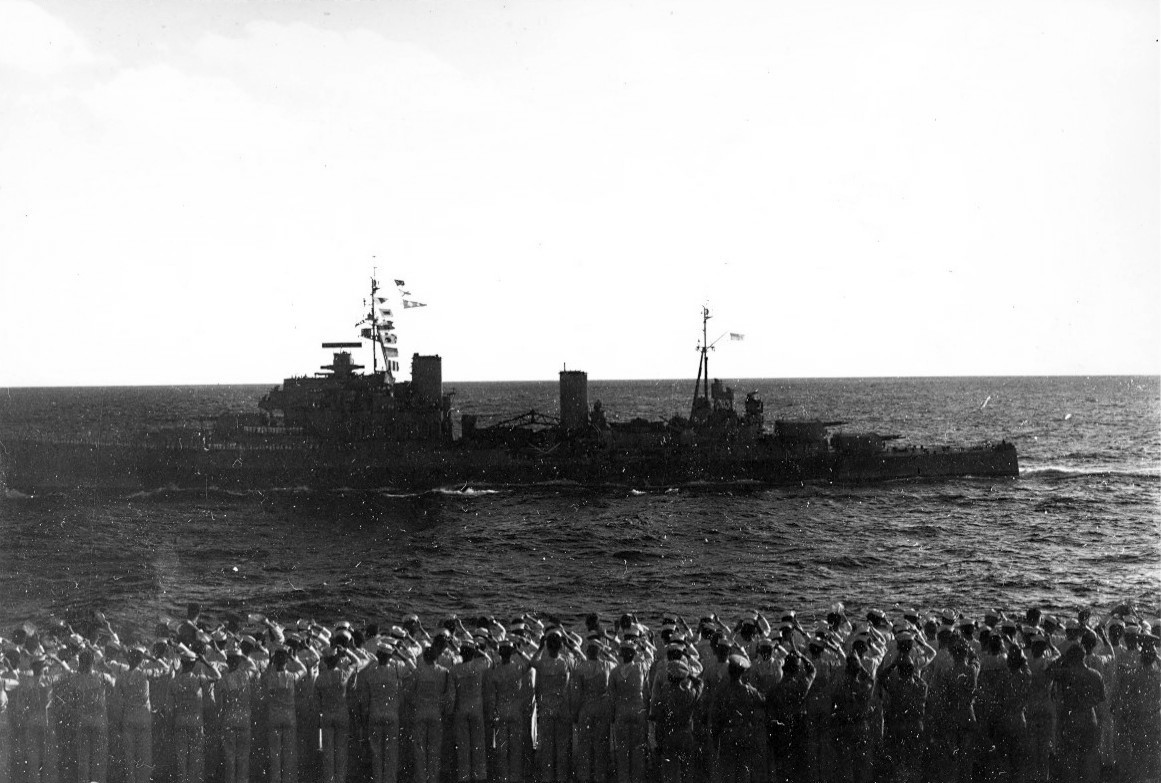
HMNZS Gambia, 18 May 1944

Because New Zealand's two other cruisers of the time, HMNZS Leander and HMNZS Achilles were damaged, it was decided in discussions with the Royal Navy Admiralty that Gambia would be recommissioned as HMNZS Gambia, for the use of the Royal New Zealand Navy.

The New Zealand Official History writes: "... HMNZS Gambia was commissioned at Liverpool on 22 September 1943 under the command of Captain William-Powlett, DSC, RN. A few of the officers and three-quarters of the ratings were New Zealanders." On 3 October 1943 the New Zealand High Commissioner visited the Gambia and addressed the ship's company. After sea trials, shaking down, and ten days attached to the 1st Cruiser Squadron in Scapa Flow, she arrived at Plymouth "... on 5 December 1943 to work with HM ships Glasgow and Enterprise under the orders of the Commander-in-Chief, Plymouth." With these ships she commenced anti-blockade runner patrols in the Bay of Biscay in December, as part of Operation Stonewall. Of particular note was the pursuit of the German blockade-runner Osorno, and the pursuit and destruction of another blockade-runner under Captain William-Powlett's overall command, but without actual involvement: "Under the circumstances," wrote William-Powlett, "Gambia, the senior of the four cruisers, was unable to take part in the successful and exciting operation carried out by Glasgow and Enterprise: she could merely play the part of an exasperated listener-in ...’

Gambia subsequently served with the British Pacific Fleet and participated in attacks on Japanese positions throughout the Pacific. In February 1944 she searched for blockade runners in the Cocos Islands area. She also supported a series of carrier raids against oil installations and airfields. She saw action off Okinawa, Formosa and Japan and took part in the bombardment of the Japanese city of Kamaishi on 9 August. She was attacked by a Japanese kamikaze aircraft as a ceasefire was announced, and fired some of the last shots of World War II.

She was present on 2 September 1945 in Tokyo Bay for the signing of the Japanese Instrument of Surrender.

=== Return to the Royal Navy ===
Gambia was returned to the Royal Navy at Portsmouth on 27 March 1946. She underwent a refit and was recommissioned on 1 July 1946 for the 5th Cruiser Squadron with the Far East Fleet. She returned to the UK on 6 January 1948, and in January 1950 she was assigned to the 2nd Cruiser Squadron in the Mediterranean, later serving with the 1st Cruiser Squadron on the same station until October 1954. In 1953, she and her sister Bermuda brought aid to the Greek island of Zakynthos when it was struck by the Ionian earthquake. Greek officials would later comment, "we Greeks have a long-standing tradition with the Royal Navy and it lived up to every expectation in its infallible tradition of always being the first to help". In the same year she took part in the Fleet Review to celebrate the Coronation of Queen Elizabeth II.

In 1955 she became flagship of the 4th Cruiser Squadron on the East Indies Station, but the decision not to continue the refit of the battleship Vanguard, meant funds were available for a life extension of Gambia and Bermuda, with additional finance and equipment from US assistance to NATO. The refit gave them a final light anti-aircraft (AA) armament of nine twin 40 mm Bofors, refitted in positions than gave wider angles of fire and US Mk 63 and SPG-35 radar fire control for the 4 inch mounts. This was similar to that being fitted to the remaining United States Navy Baltimore-class cruisers in 1956–57, although the twelve twin 3-inch/50 calibre guns on the US cruisers were far more accurate and effective than the Royal Navy Mk 5 Bofors or X1X twin 4-inch guns.

In May 1957 Gambia sailed again for the Persian Gulf, becoming the last flagship for the Commander-in-Chief, East Indies, Vice Admiral Hilary Biggs, and returned to Rosyth on 19 September 1958. On 4 November 1958 she recommissioned for the 1st Cruiser Squadron in the Mediterranean. She deployed to the Far East on 4 December 1959 to relieve the cruiser Ceylon in the Red Sea. The ship returned to the UK via South Africa with a visit to Freetown and the Gambia, before arriving in Portsmouth in July 1960. The last months of 1960 she served in the South Atlantic and the Home Fleet before entering the reserve in December of that year, her crew largely going to the new cruiser Blake.

== Decommissioning and fate ==
Gambia was paid off to reserve in December 1960. She remained in reserve at Portsmouth until she was put on the disposal list and sold to Thos. W. Ward for scrapping. She left Portsmouth under tow on 2 December 1968 and arrived at Inverkeithing for breaking up on 5 December.
