= HMS Uganda =

Scrapped British and Canadian light cruiser

- Uganda underway

History

United Kingdom
- Name: Uganda
- Namesake: Protectorate of Uganda
- Ordered: 1939
- Builder: Vickers-Armstrongs, Newcastle upon Tyne
- Laid down: 20 July 1939
- Launched: 7 August 1941
- Commissioned: 3 January 1943
- Identification: Pennant number: 66
- Honours and awards: Atlantic 1943, Sicily 1943, Salerno 1943, Mediterranean 1943
- Fate: Transferred to Royal Canadian Navy on 21 October 1944

Canada
- Name: Uganda
- Acquired: 21 October 1944
- Commissioned: 21 October 1944
- Honours and awards: Okinawa 1945
- Renamed: HMCS Quebec 14 January 1952
- Namesake: Province of Quebec
- Recommissioned: 14 January 1952
- Decommissioned: 15 June 1956
- Identification: Pennant number: C66
- Motto: Nos canons parleront (Our cannons shall speak)
- Fate: Arrived at Osaka, Japan, on 6 February 1961 for scrapping
- Badge: Or, a maple leaf vert charged with a fleur-de-lis of the first

General characteristics
- Class & type: Fiji-class light cruiser
- Displacement: 8,712 tons standard; 11,024 tons full load
- Length: 169.3 m (555 ft 5 in)
- Beam: 18.9 m (62 ft 0 in)
- Draught: 5.3 m (17 ft 5 in)
- Propulsion: 4 x oil fired three-drum Admiralty-type boilers; four-shaft geared turbines; four screws; 54,100 kW (72,500 shp)
- Speed: 33 kn (61 km/h; 38 mph)
- Range: 10,200 nmi (18,900 km; 11,700 mi) at 12 kn (22 km/h; 14 mph)
- Complement: 730 (wartime); 650 (peacetime)
- Sensors & processing systems: Type 281 air search; Type 272 surface search; Type 277 height finding; Type 274 fire control (152 mm); Type 283 fire control (102 mm); Type 282 fire control (2 pdr)
- Armament: 3 × triple BL 6 in (152 mm) Mk XXIII guns; 4 × twin QF Mk XVI 4 in (102 mm) guns; 4 × quadruple Mk VII 2-pounder (40 mm) guns; 10 × twin Mk II 20 mm/70 cal guns; 2 × triple 21 in (533 mm) torpedo tubes
- Armour: Belt 82.5–88.9 mm (3.25–3.50 in); Turrets 25.4–50.8 mm (1.00–2.00 in)
- Aircraft carried: Two Supermarine Walrus aircraft, removed November 1943.

HMS Uganda was a Second World War-era Fiji-class light cruiser launched in 1941. She served in the Royal Navy during 1943 and 1944, including operations in the Mediterranean, and was transferred to the Royal Canadian Navy as HMCS Uganda in October 1944. She served in the Pacific theatre in 1945 and was put into reserve in 1947. When she was reactivated for the Korean War in 1952 she was renamed HMCS Quebec. She was decommissioned for the last time in 1956 and scrapped in Japan in 1961.

== Construction and career ==
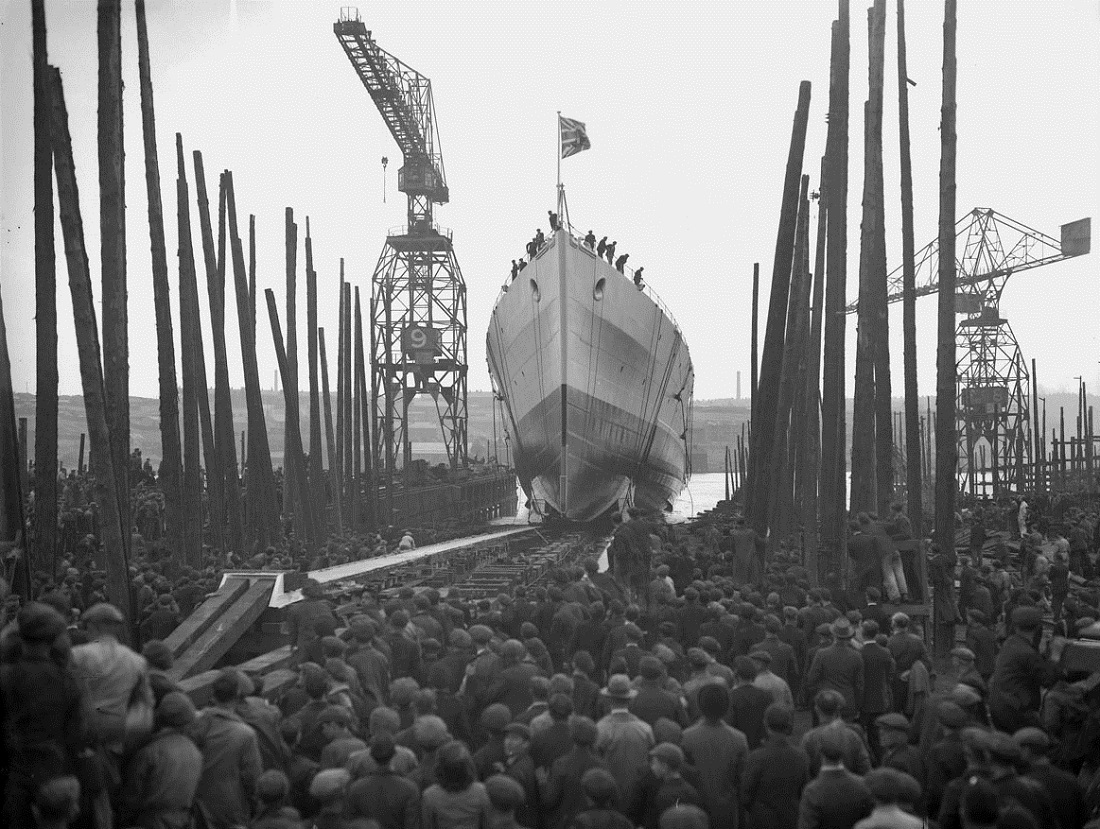
Launch of HMS Uganda at the Walker Naval Yard, 7 August 1941

HMS Uganda was one of the Ceylon sub-class (the second group of three ships built in 1939) of the Fiji-class cruisers, and built by Vickers-Armstrongs at its Walker yard. She was launched on 7 August 1941 and commissioned on 3 January 1943.

=== Home Fleet operations ===
In March 1943 after training at Scapa Flow, Uganda sailed as convoy escort to protect a Sierra Leone-bound convoy from the German Narvik-class destroyers operating from the Bay of Biscay. After two such convoy duties, she was sent as escort for the ocean liner RMS Queen Mary carrying Winston Churchill and his staff to Washington. The journey was made at 30 knots (56 km/h; 35 mph), and the ship sailed into Naval Station Argentia, in Newfoundland, low on fuel. Upon return from that duty Uganda sailed back to Plymouth for a refit.

=== Mediterranean Fleet operations ===
With her refit completed, she was sent to the Mediterranean Sea as escort to one of the largest troop convoys of the war heading to Sicily. In July the ship joined the 15th Cruiser Squadron of the Mediterranean Fleet. Uganda was part of the bombardment fleet for Operation Husky, the invasion of Sicily, on 10 July 1943. She was then assigned to close support for major bombardments throughout Sicily. Uganda sailed as part of the support force for Operation Husky from Alexandria along with three cruisers and six destroyers. Uganda was part of Support Force East during the Operation Husky landings. Within the British bridgehead, Uganda, with the cruisers Orion and Mauritius and the monitor Erebus supported the British Eighth Army. On 10 August, again in support of the Eighth Army, Uganda and the Dutch gunboat Flores bombarded positions north of Reposto. On 12 August, Uganda, the monitor Roberts and the Dutch gunboats Scarab and Soemba shelled the east coast of Sicily.

On the opening of Operation Avalanche, 9 September 1943, she was part of the fleet bombardment covering the invasion of Italy at Salerno. As part of Operation Avalanche, Uganda was a member of the Northern Attack Force, which landed the British X Corps. The cruiser was a member of the support and escort group for the force. The landings are successful, however the Germans counterattacked and created a serious situation on the beachhead. Uganda was among the ships forced to lie inshore to provide direct naval gunfire support. The fleet then suffered air attacks using FX 1400 radio-controlled and Hs 293 glider bombs. While serving off Salerno at 1440 on 13 September 1943 she took a direct hit from a new German radio controlled 1.4 tonne glide bomb Fritz X dropped by a KG 100 bomber. The Fritz X passed through seven decks and straight through her keel, exploding underwater just under the keel. The concussive shock of the Fritz X's underwater detonation close to Uganda's hull extinguished all her boiler fires, and resulted in sixteen men being killed, with Uganda taking on 1,300 tons of water. Damage control under Lieutenant Leslie Reed managed to get the ship moving with one engine. She was towed to Malta by USS Narragansett, where temporary repairs were made.

There being no dry dock available in the European Theatre that could handle the repairs, Uganda was sent to the US shipyard at Charleston, South Carolina. The heavily damaged ship, with only one of her four propellers working, proceeded across the Atlantic Ocean to Charleston, arriving on 27 November 1943. During the repairs, Uganda had two hangars designed for carrying Supermarine Walrus reconnaissance aircraft removed. These hangars were used for radio and radar equipment as well as crew amenities.

=== Transfer to Canada ===
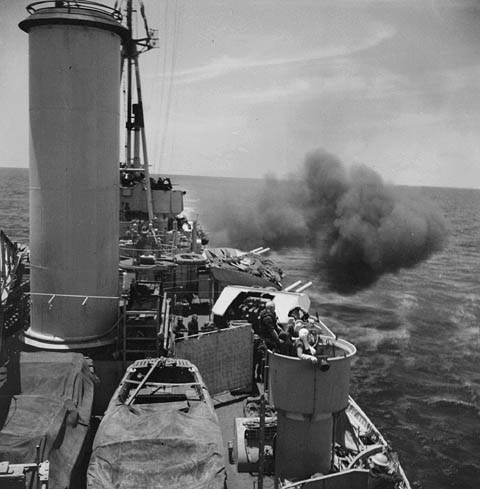
Bombardment by HMCS Uganda of Sukuma Airfield on Miyako-jima in May 1945

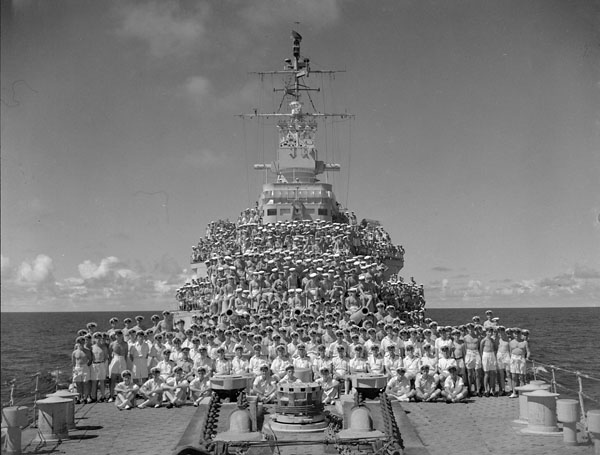
Ship's company of the cruiser HMCS Uganda, August 1945.

While under repair, the Government of Canada negotiated with Britain to obtain Uganda for the Royal Canadian Navy (RCN). The official transfer took place on Trafalgar Day, 21 October 1944, at Charleston and she was renamed HMCS Uganda, out of respect for the British colony. Uganda's first crew in RCN service was notable. The commanding officer was Captain Rollo Mainguy, who later became chief of the Naval Staff. The first officer (executive officer) was Commander Hugh Pullen, and other officers including Lieutenant Commander William Landymore were all eventually promoted to flag rank following the war. Lieutenant John Robarts, Aircraft Recognition Officer, went on to become Premier of Ontario. The other members of her crew of 907 comprised a carefully selected group; additional training on cruisers was provided through personnel exchanges with the RN. The first crew for Uganda was drawn from every province in Canada as well as the Dominion of Newfoundland. Eighty-seven per cent were reservists (RCNVR and RCNR) while the balance were regular members of the Royal Canadian Navy.

Uganda's first assignment came shortly after her recommissioning. She was tasked to join the British Pacific Fleet's operational area south of Sakishima Gunto. She joined the 4th Cruiser Squadron and spent the rest of the month working up. The conditions for the crew were arduous since the ship had not been modified for tropical conditions, which would have provided better air circulation throughout the ship and more fresh water capacity. Uganda left Halifax, Nova Scotia, on 31 October 1944 and steamed via the United Kingdom where following her reconstruction at Charleston, the cruiser underwent further modification. She departed the United Kingdom in January 1945 and sailed to the Pacific, stopping at Gibraltar, Alexandria, Egypt, the Suez Canal, and on via Aden and Colombo, Ceylon, to the fleet base at Fremantle, Western Australia, where she arrived on 4 March 1945.

As the flagship for the RCN, Uganda served in the Pacific War with the British Pacific Fleet, joining it at Sydney, Australia, in February 1945. Assigned to Task Force 57, British Pacific Fleet, because her radar and aircraft identification capabilities were amongst the best in the fleet, owing to her 1944 refit in Charleston. On 10 April 1945, the strike against Sakishima Gunto was cancelled and the task force was ordered to attack Formosa instead. From 11 to 13 April 1945, as part of Task Force 57 in the Pacific, Uganda attacked airfields and installations in northern Formosa, before being redirected back to Sakishima Gunto. The cruiser took part in the bombardment of the Japanese airbases on Sakishima Gunto between 15–20 April before the fleet was tasked to Leyte Gulf. During her time with Task Force 57, Uganda came under kamikaze attack. She received battle honours for operations during the Battle of Okinawa and was involved in attacking Truk, Formosa and Sakishima Gunto.

At Leyte she joined the United States Third Fleet, 300 nautical miles (560 km) east of Japan and became the only Royal Canadian Navy warship to fight in the Pacific Theatre against the Imperial Japanese Navy. In May 1945, Task Force 57 sailed from Leyte to attack Sakishima Gunto for nearly the entire month. Uganda was among the ships ordered to bombard the island group. The task force suffered kamikaze attacks, forcing two of the aircraft carriers to retire and damaging another.

In the aftermath of the Conscription Crisis of 1944, on 4 April 1945, the Canadian government changed the manning policy for all ships deploying to the Pacific theatre. All those heading to the Pacific would have to re-volunteer. Upon volunteering again, the serviceman would be eligible for 30 days leave in Canada before deployment. Controversially this policy change was applied to those already there and Uganda's RCN crew were polled by the Canadian government on 7 May 1945 to determine whether they would volunteer for further duties in the Pacific War. Widespread discontent had grown amongst the crew, due to poor living conditions, kamikaze attacks and the lack of a Canadian identity for the ship (for instance, the Canadian Red Ensign was not flown and no maple leaf was painted on the funnel, which many crewmen saw as an insult to Canada). The crew of Uganda felt that they had enlisted for "hostilities only" (i.e., hostilities against Nazi Germany), but now found themselves fighting a different enemy in a quite different part of the world. The policy also signalled the Canadian government's lack of commitment to the Pacific War. Captain Mainguy later acknowledged that: "The next signal we got fairly shortly was: 'Do you volunteer to fight against the Japanese?' It seemed pretty stupid. [There] were those incentives just to be annoyed and say, 'Well, if we're not wanted, of course, we don't want to fight the Japs if it's not necessary.'" In addition, when the "volunteers only" policy became public knowledge in Canada, family obligations became an increasing burden, as this left the crew with a difficult decision to prioritize their families or their sense of duty that had driven them to volunteer in the first place.

As a result, the vote on 7 May was held onboard Uganda and 605 crew out of 907 refused to re-volunteer for continuing operations against Japan. The British Admiralty was furious and said it could not replace the ship until 27 July at the earliest. However, the cruiser continued her deployment in the Pacific throughout June and July while the Naval Staff sought an answer to the problem. An embarrassed Royal Canadian Navy offered to replace Uganda with HMCS Prince Robert, an anti-aircraft flak ship that was being refitted in Vancouver.

Uganda took part in Operation Inmate, a carrier raid on Japanese installations at Truk. Sailing on 12 June from Manus Island, the cruiser was among the ships detailed to bombard the island of Dublon. The force returned to Manus Island on 17 June. In July, Uganda, now part of Task Force 37, sailed to join up with the Americans performing carrier air strikes on the Tokyo area, arriving on 16 July. On 27 July, Uganda was relieved by HMS Argonaut.

HMCS Uganda was detached from the US Navy's Third Fleet on 27 July when Argonaut arrived. Uganda proceeded to Eniwetok, and then to Pearl Harbor for refuelling before heading for Esquimalt. En route to Pearl Harbor, one boiler suffered a liner collapse which would have resulted in the ship's withdrawal from active combat at any rate. Uganda limped into Pearl Harbor on 4 August but was not welcomed because of the resentment that her crew was "quitting" the war. Uganda departed for Esquimalt after refuelling. En route to Canada, the crew heard news about the atomic bombs being dropped on Japan. They arrived in Esquimalt on 10 August, the day that Japan announced its acceptance of the Instrument of Surrender.

HMCS Uganda remained on the Pacific coast following the war, serving in a training capacity. The cruiser was paid off on 1 August 1947 into the RCN reserve.

=== Return to service ===
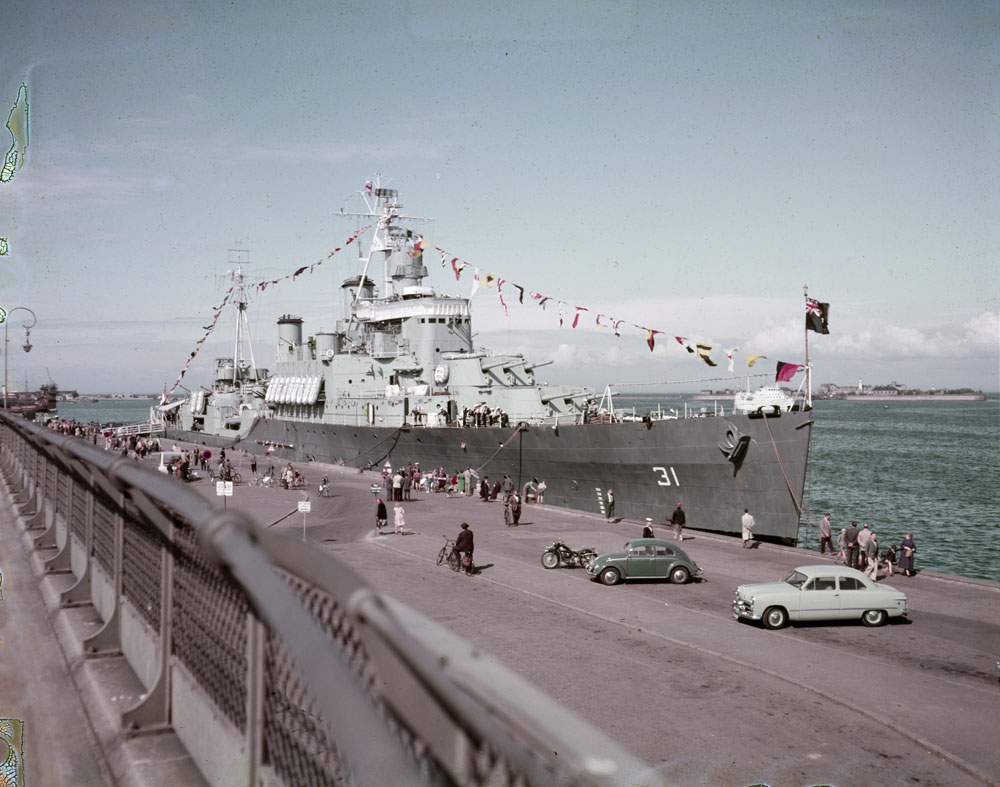
HMCS Quebec in Copenhagen in 1954

Canada's entry into the Korean War and commitment of Canadian Army, Royal Canadian Air Force and Royal Canadian Navy units to the British Commonwealth Forces Korea necessitated the reactivation of HMCS Uganda. Beginning in August 1951, the cruiser was refitted and modernized at Esquimalt. The vessel was recommissioned on 14 January 1952 as HMCS Quebec (C31) and moved immediately from Esquimalt to her new station at Halifax to replace units which had departed for Korea. On 14 June 1952, Quebec visited her namesake province for the first time during a port visit to Sorel, Quebec. From 13–25 September, Quebec and the aircraft carrier Magnificent participated in the major NATO naval exercise Mainbrace in northern European waters.

In February 1953, Quebec, with Portage and Huron sailed to Bermuda for training with the Royal Navy submarine Andrew. On 15 June 1953, HMCS Quebec was the flagship for Rear Admiral Bidwell and led the RCN ships to Spithead for the coronation of Queen Elizabeth II. The Royal Canadian Navy group consisted of an aircraft carrier, two cruisers, one destroyer, and two frigates. In October 1954, Quebec sailed on a seven-week training cruise to the Caribbean Sea and South America, making several port visits. Returning in mid-April 1955, Quebec became the first Canadian naval ship to circumnavigate Africa. As part of a post–Korean War realignment within the navy, HMCS Quebec was paid off on 13 June 1956 and placed in reserve at Sydney, Nova Scotia. The ship was sold in 1960 with the partially dismantled Ontario to Mitsui and Co. of Japan for scrap. The ship was broken up in Japan in 1961.

Her unit name lived on in the form of HMCS Quebec, a cadet summer training centre for the Royal Canadian Sea Cadets. The training centre closed permanently after its summer 2012 operating season.
