= HMS Bermuda (52) =

Fiji-class cruiser

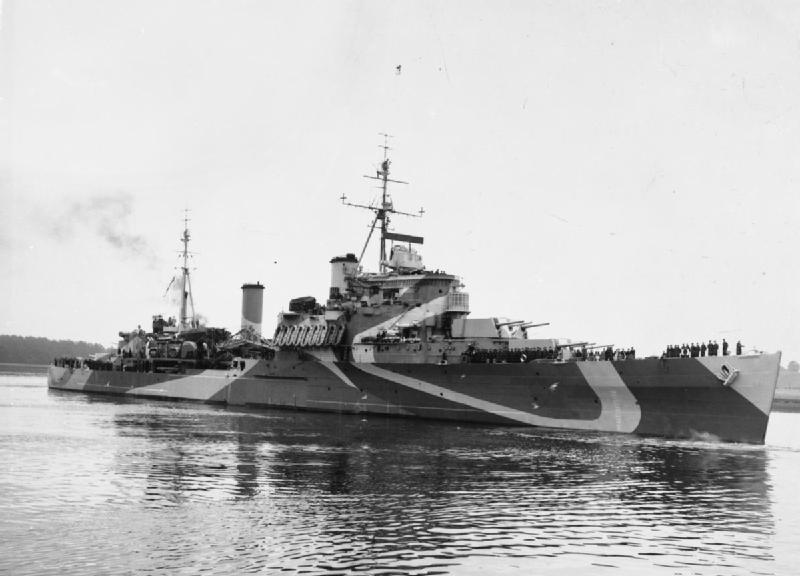
- Bermuda in 1942

History

United Kingdom
- Name: Bermuda
- Namesake: Bermuda
- Builder: John Brown & Company, Clydebank
- Yard number: 568
- Laid down: 30 November 1939
- Launched: 11 September 1941
- Commissioned: 21 August 1942
- Decommissioned: 1962
- Identification: Pennant number 52
- Fate: Scrapped, 26 August 1965

General characteristics (as built)
- Class & type: Fiji-class light cruiser
- Displacement: 8,631 long tons (8,770 t) (standard)
- Length: 555 ft 6 in (169.3 m)
- Beam: 62 ft (18.9 m)
- Draught: 19 ft 10 in (6 m)
- Installed power: 4 Admiralty 3-drum boilers; 80,000 shp (60,000 kW)
- Propulsion: 4 shafts; 4 geared steam turbine sets
- Speed: 32.25 knots (59.73 km/h; 37.11 mph)
- Range: 6,250 nmi (11,580 km; 7,190 mi) at 13 knots (24 km/h; 15 mph)
- Complement: 733 (peacetime), 900 (wartime)
- Armament: 4 × triple 6 in (152 mm) guns; 4 × twin 4 in (102 mm) DP guns; 2 × quadruple 2-pdr (40 mm (1.6 in)) AA guns; 10 × single 20 mm (0.8 in) Oerlikon AA guns; 2 × triple 21 in (533 mm) torpedo tubes
- Armour: Engine and boiler rooms: 3.25 in (83 mm); Decks: 2–3.5 in (51–89 mm); Magazines: 2–3.5 in (51–89 mm); Gun turrets: 1–2 in (25–51 mm)
- Aircraft carried: 2 × seaplanes
- Aviation facilities: 1 × catapult, 2 × hangars

HMS Bermuda (pennant number 52, later C52) was a Fiji-class light cruiser of the Royal Navy. She was completed during World War II and served in that conflict. She was named for the British territory of Bermuda, and was the eighth vessel of that name.

Bermuda was built by John Brown & Company of Clydebank and launched on 11 September 1941. In the same year, the lead ship of the class, Fiji, was sunk while participating in the evacuation of Crete.

== War service ==
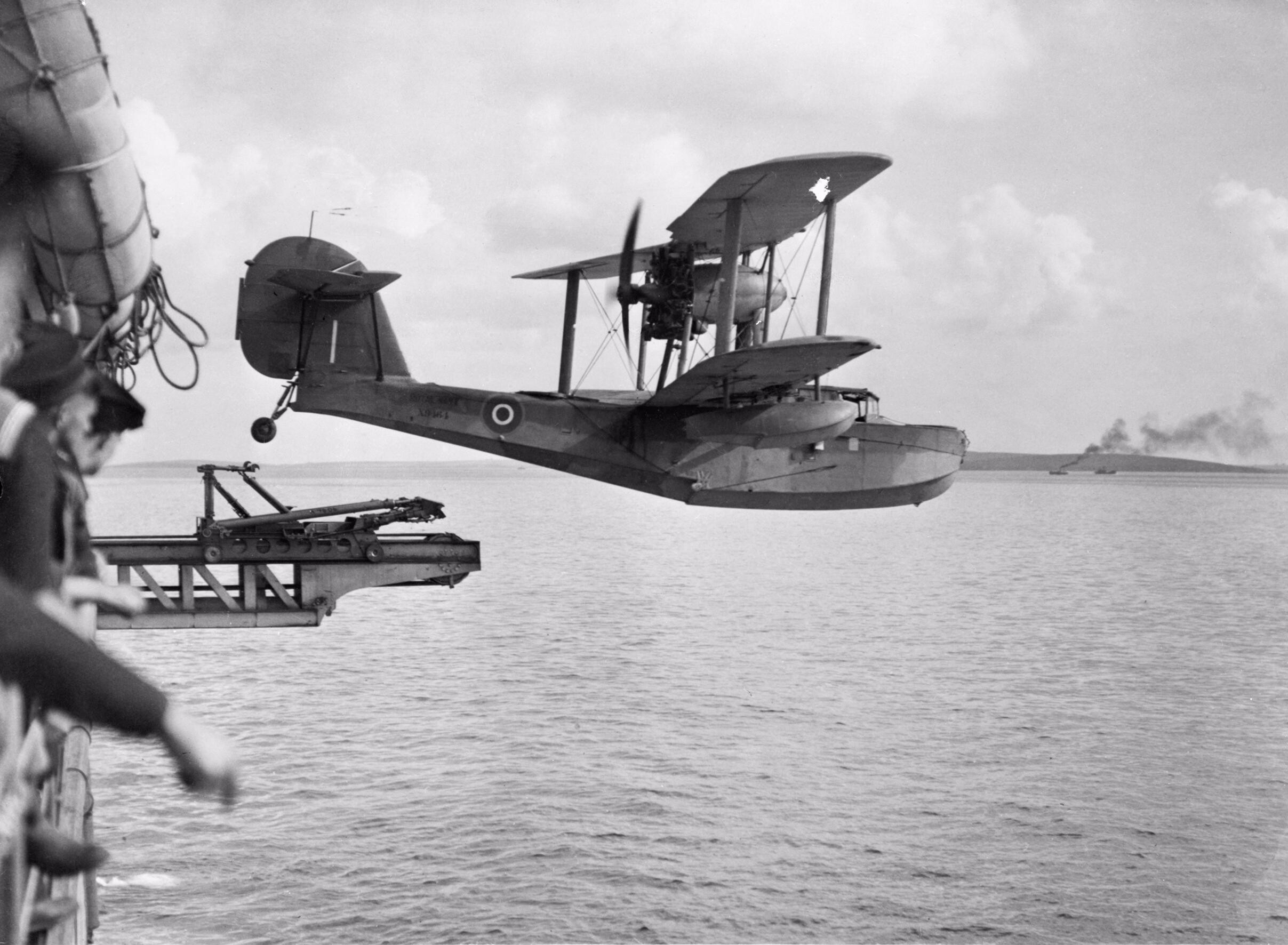
A Supermarine Walrus amphibian airplane being launched from the catapult deck of Bermuda. The aircraft has just left the catapult.

Through 1942, Bermuda participated in the North Africa campaign, including Operation Torch, as part of the 10th Cruiser Squadron. With the cruiser Sheffield, she was detached from Force H to attack a small coastal fort, where both came under attack from Italian torpedo bombers. She covered the landing at Bougie and managed to escape heavy air attacks unscathed. Bermuda then returned to service in the Atlantic to escort ships in the Bay of Biscay, and in June 1943, she transported men and supplies to Spitsbergen. She then participated in anti-submarine operations against German U-boats operating in the Bay of Biscay, and the North Atlantic. After more service in the Arctic, she returned to Glasgow in June 1944 for a refit.

The refit removed her 'X' turret and in May 1945 she was then dispatched to the Pacific as the war in Europe was ending. She arrived in Fremantle on 1 July to take on fuel and stores, before continuing on to Sydney, where she arrived on 7 July. There she undertook exercises with other Royal Navy ships serving in the Far East, including the battleship Anson. Whilst in Sydney, news reached them of the atomic bombings of Hiroshima and Nagasaki and the subsequent surrender of Japan. Bermuda then sailed for the Philippines, arriving on 23 August. She then became part of an operation to recover allied prisoners of war from the previously occupied Japanese territories.

On 6 September Bermuda was attacked by Japanese aircraft, apparently unaware of the end of the war, or otherwise unwilling to surrender. Bermuda fought off the attack and was able to continue on her way. She then transported allied prisoners of war to Shanghai for repatriation.

== Post-war ==
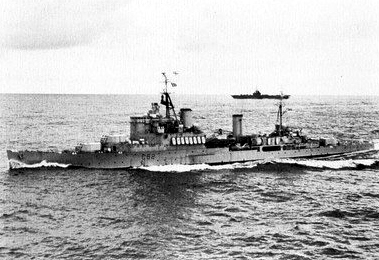
Bermuda operating with the US aircraft carrier USS Essex in the North Atlantic, 1961

Bermuda remained in the Far East as the flagship of the 5th Cruiser Squadron, under the command of Clarence Howard-Johnston, until 1947, when she returned to the UK for a refit at Chatham Dockyard. She was then placed in reserve. In 1950 she was restored to active service, and served in the South Atlantic as the flagship of the Commander in Chief, South Atlantic Station until 1953. Vice Admiral Peveril William-Powlett was Commander-in-Chief, South Atlantic from 1952–1954. She then served with the Mediterranean Fleet. In 1953, she and her sister Gambia brought aid to the Greek island of Zakynthos when it was struck by the Ionian earthquake. Greek officials would later comment, "we Greeks have a long-standing tradition with the Royal Navy and it lived up to every expectation in its infallible tradition of always being the first to help."

In 1956 Bermuda was paid-off and towed up to Palmer's at Hebburn to undergo a long refit. She was updated largely on the same pattern as HMS Gambia with an enclosed bridge, and US supplied Mk 63 directors for the 4-inch twin gun mounts, but appears to have maintained simple tacymetric fire control for new Twin Mk 5 40-mm mounts, which were repositioned for better arcs of fire. She returned to service, and spent the next few years in exercises with other NATO navies, or other Royal Navy units. In April 1958, she left Malta to assist in the reinforcement of Cyprus during a period of civil unrest. Bermuda attended the Ceremony of independence of Nigeria on 1 October 1960, before joining the Mediterranean Fleet, relieving the cruiser Tiger.

Bermuda was decommissioned in 1962, after 21 years in service. She was scrapped by Thos W Ward, Briton Ferry, Wales starting on 26 August 1965. The ship's bell now hangs in the Royal Naval Association Club in West Bromwich, a British town which had adopted Bermuda in 1942.

== Bermuda ==
HMS Bermuda made several visits to her namesake, where she was presented with a number of silver objects, including a large bell — which was occasionally used as a font for Holy Water in the baptism of children of the crew — and four bugles. Two of the bugles later found their way to the Bermuda Regiment. Apart from the bell and the bugles, which were collected together by the Bermuda Maritime Museum at the former Bermuda Dockyard, the other items went missing following the ship's decommissioning.
