= HMS Newfoundland =

Fiji-class light cruiser of the Royal Navy

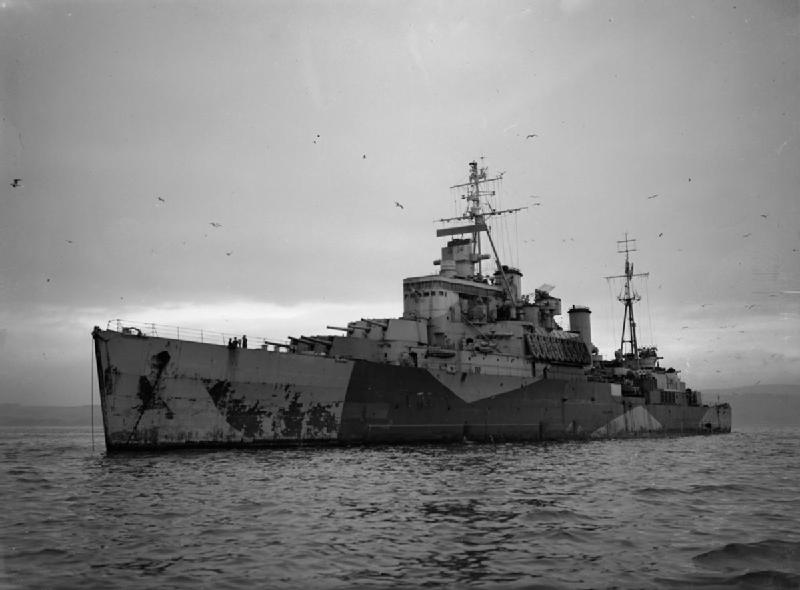

History

United Kingdom
- Name: Newfoundland
- Namesake: Dominion of Newfoundland
- Builder: Swan Hunter, Wallsend
- Laid down: 9 November 1939
- Launched: 19 December 1941
- Commissioned: 21 January 1943
- Identification: Pennant number: 59
- Honours and awards: Mediterranean 1940–1945, Sicily 1943
- Fate: Sold to Peruvian Navy, 30 December 1959
- Badge: A caribou

Peru
- Name: BAP Almirante Grau
- Namesake: Miguel Grau Seminario
- Acquired: 30 December 1959
- Renamed: Renamed Capitan Quinones on 15 May 1973
- Reclassified: As a static training ship, 1979
- Fate: Scrapped, 1979

General characteristics Post 1951 modernisation
- Class & type: Fiji-class light cruiser
- Displacement: 8,712 tons standard; 11,024 tons full load
- Length: 169.3 m (555 ft)
- Beam: 18.9 m (62 ft)
- Draught: 5.3 m (17 ft)
- Propulsion: Four oil fired three-drum Admiralty-type boilers; four-shaft geared turbines; four screws; 54.1 megawatts (72,500 shp)
- Speed: 33 knots (61 km/h)
- Range: 10,200 nautical miles (18,900 km) at 12 kn (22 km/h)
- Complement: 730 (wartime); 650 (peacetime)
- Sensors & processing systems: Type 960M air search; Type 274 surface search; Type 277 height finding; Type 274 fire control (152 mm); Type 275 fire control (102 mm); Type 262（MRS1） fire control (40 mm)
- Armament: 3 triple BL 6 inch Mk XXIII naval guns (152/50 mm); 4 twin Mk XVI 102/45 mm guns; 5×2 & 2x1 Mk3 40 mm Bofors
- Armour: 82.5–88.9 mm belt; 25.4–50.8 mm turrets
- Aircraft carried: Two Supermarine Walrus aircraft (Later removed)

HMS Newfoundland was a Fiji-class light cruiser of the Royal Navy. Named after the Dominion of Newfoundland, she participated in the Second World War and was later sold to the Peruvian Navy and renamed BAP Almirante Grau.

The hospital ship HMHS Newfoundland was a different ship, although also torpedoed in the Mediterranean in 1943.

== Early career ==
Newfoundland was built by Swan Hunter and launched 19 December 1941 by the wife of the then British Minister of Labour, Ernest Bevin. The ship was completed in December 1942 and commissioned the next month.

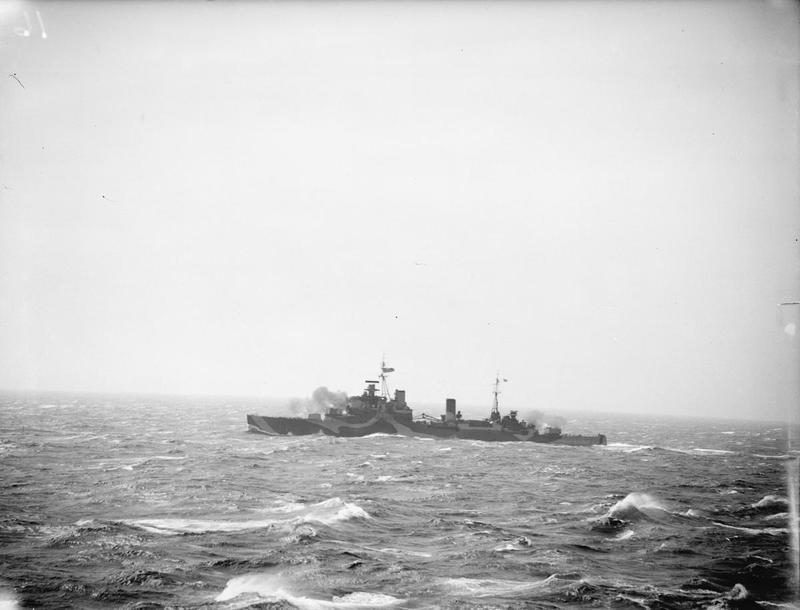
HMS Newfoundland firing her 6-inch guns during target practice, April 1943. Taken from HMS Rodney

After commissioning Newfoundland joined the 10th Cruiser Squadron, Home Fleet. Early in 1943 the ship became flagship of the 15th Cruiser Squadron, Mediterranean. On the night of 13/14 July 1943, during Sicily Campaign, she provided effective support for 1st Parachute Brigade helping to secure the Primasole Bridge, linking Catania with Syra.

On 23 July 1943, she was torpedoed by the Italian submarine Ascianghi. Some sources attribute the torpedo to the German submarine U-407. One crewman was killed in the attack. Her rudder having been blown off, temporary repairs were carried out at Malta. Later, steering by her propellers only, and with the assistance of "jury rigged" sails between her funnels, she steamed to the Boston Navy Yard for major repairs.

In 1944 the ship was re-commissioned for service in the Far East. While at Alexandria an exploding air vessel occurred in one of the torpedoes in the port tubes which caused severe damage and one casualty. The repairs delayed her arrival in the Far East for service with the British Pacific Fleet (BPF). Newfoundland went to New Guinea to support the Australian 6th Division in the Aitape-Wewak campaign. On 14 June 1945, as part of a BPF task group, Newfoundland attacked the Japanese naval base at Truk, in the Caroline Islands during Operation Inmate.

On 6 July Newfoundland left the forward base of Manus in the Admiralty Islands with other ships of the BPF to take part in the Allied campaign against the Japanese home islands. On 9 August she took part in a bombardment of the Japanese city of Kamaishi. Newfoundland was part of a British Empire force which took control of the naval base at Yokosuka.

The ship was present in Tokyo Bay when the Instrument of Surrender was signed aboard the US battleship USS Missouri, on 2 September 1945.

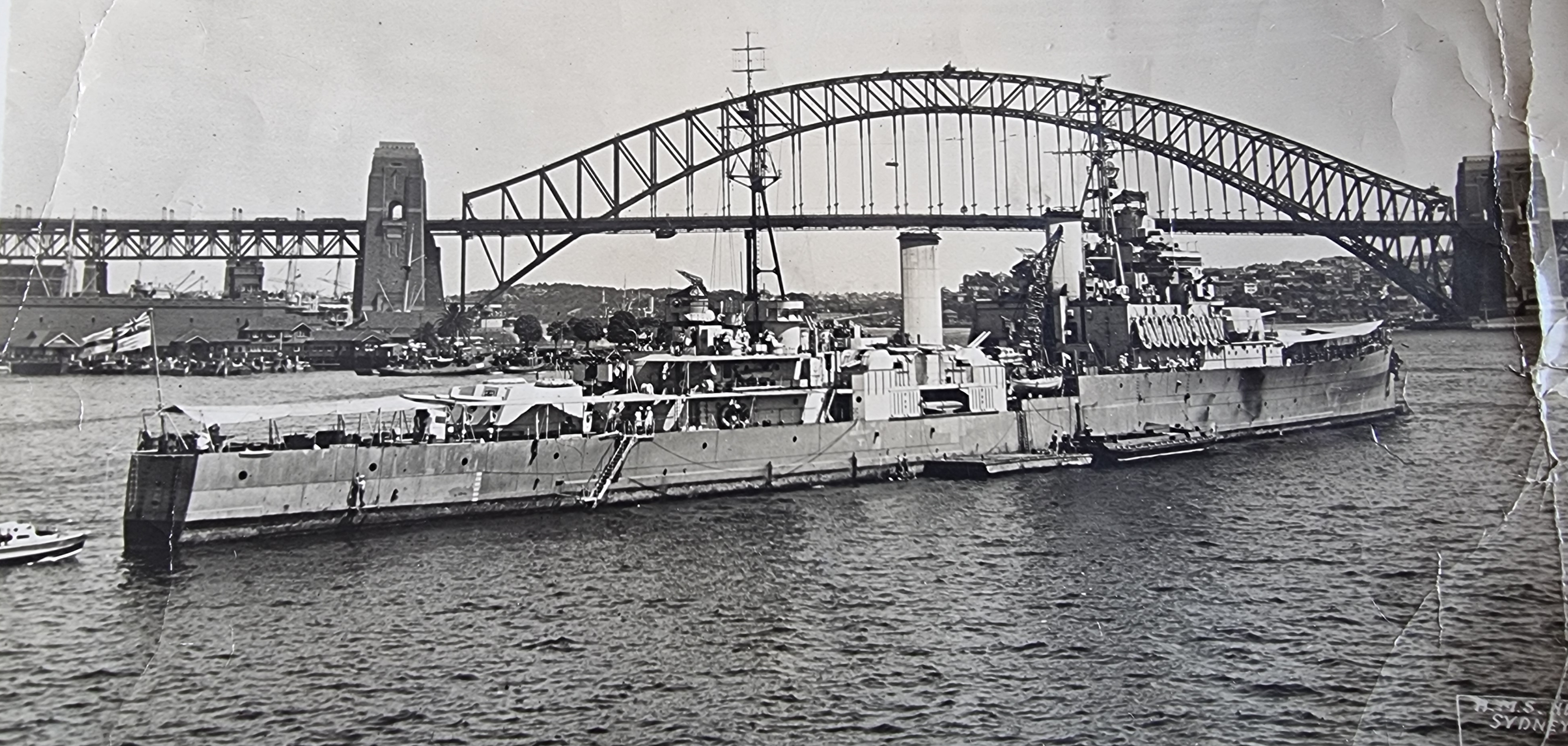
HMS Newfoundland, moored at Sydney, late 1945

On 27 October 1946, the Japanese heavy cruiser Takao was towed to the Strait of Malacca. Newfoundland sunk her as a target ship on 29 October 1946 at 03°05′05″N 100°41′00″E. Newfoundland was assigned the task of repatriating British Empire prisoners of war. She returned to Great Britain in December 1946.

== Postwar ==
Newfoundland was initially in reserve, and was used as a training ship as part of the stokers' training establishment HMS Imperieuse, before starting a 20-month reconstruction at Plymouth in 1951. The modernisation was one of the more extensive of those applied to the Colony or Town-class cruisers in the 1950s with Newfoundland receiving extensive new electrical and fire control systems, a new bridge, comprehensive nuclear spraydown capability and lattice masts, particularly for the 960 radar in a similar structure to that later fitted to the cruisers Royalist and Belfast. The integrated 275 and MRS-1 fire control for the 4 twin and 40mm mounts was the most comprehensive fitted to a modernised Royal Navy cruiser but possibly not as reliable as the simpler installations on the cruisers Ceylon and Belfast.

Recommissioned on 5 November 1952, she became flagship of the 4th Cruiser Squadron in the East Indies. The cabinet of Sri Lanka met on board her during the Hartal of 1953. From December 1953 Newfoundland underwent a three-month refit at Singapore before transferring to the Far East Station, shelling Malayan National Liberation Army targets near Penang in June 1954 when on passage to the Far East.

On 31 October 1956, the Egyptian frigate Domiat was cruising South of the Suez Canal in the Red Sea, when Newfoundland encountered her and ordered her to heave to. Aware of tensions between Britain and Egypt that would lead to the Suez Crisis, Domiat refused and opened fire on the cruiser, causing some damage and casualties. The cruiser, with the destroyer Diana, then returned fire and sank her opponent, rescuing 69 survivors from the wreckage. One man from the Newfoundland was killed and five were wounded.

Newfoundland then returned to the Far East until paid off to the reserve at Portsmouth on 24 June 1959. She was sold to the Peruvian Navy on 2 November 1959, and subsequently renamed Almirante Grau and then to Capitán Quiñones in 1973. The cruiser was hulked in 1979 and used as a static training ship in Callao, before being decommissioned and scrapped later that year.
