= BAP Coronel Bolognesi (CL-82) =

Fiji-class light cruiser of the Peruvian Navy

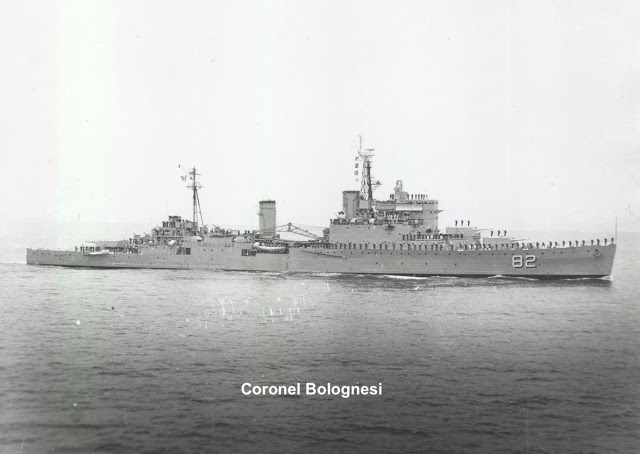

History

United Kingdom
- Name: Ceylon
- Builder: Alexander Stephen and Sons, Govan
- Laid down: 27 April 1939
- Launched: 30 July 1942
- Commissioned: 13 July 1943
- Out of service: Transferred to Peruvian Navy on 18 December 1959

Peru
- Name: Coronel Bolognesi
- Commissioned: 9 February 1960
- Decommissioned: 20 September 1982
- Fate: Scrapped in Taiwan, August 1985

General characteristics
- Class & type: Fiji-class light cruiser
- Displacement: 8,712 tonnes standard; 11,024 tons full load
- Length: 169.3 m (555 ft 5 in)
- Beam: 18.9 m (62 ft 0 in)
- Draught: 5.3 m (17 ft 5 in)
- Propulsion: Four oil fired three-drum Admiralty-type boilers; four-shaft geared turbines; four screws; 54.1 megawatts (72,500 shp)
- Speed: 33 knots (61 km/h; 38 mph)
- Range: 10,200 nmi (18,900 km; 11,700 mi) at 12 knots (22 km/h; 14 mph)
- Complement: 730 (wartime); 650 (peacetime)
- Sensors & processing systems: Type 281 air search; Type 272 surface search; Type 277 height finding; Type 274 fire control (152 mm); Type 283 fire control (102 mm); Type 282 fire control (2 pdr)
- Armament: 3 triple Mk XXIII 152/50 mm guns; 4 twin Mk XIX 102/45 mm guns; 4 quadruple Mk VII 2 pdr (40 mm) pom-pom guns; 10 twin Mk II 20/70 mm guns; 2 triple 533 mm torpedo tubes
- Armour: 82.5-88.9 mm belt; 25.4-50.8 mm turrets
- Aircraft carried: Bell 47G helicopter (deck only)

BAP Coronel Bolognesi (CL-82) was a Fiji-class light cruiser in service with the Peruvian Navy. It was completed for the Royal Navy in 1943 as HMS Ceylon and, after being withdrawn from service, commissioned by the Marina de Guerra del Perú on February 9, 1960. Renamed BAP Coronel Bolognesi (CL-82), in honor of the Peruvian Colonel Francisco Bolognesi, it arrived at its new home port of Callao on 19 March 1960.

In service, the ship participated in several exercises, including the multinational UNITAS manoeuvres, as well as taking part in disaster relief operations after the 1970 Ancash earthquake. In 1963, after the creation of the Servicio de Aviación Naval (Naval Aviation Service), the Coronel Bolognesi started operating Bell 47G helicopters from its fantail. It went into reserve on 9 June 1981, renamed Pontón Perú (UAI-113) on 30 May 1982 and decommissioned on 20 September of the same year.

== Sources ==
- Rodríguez Asti, John, Cruceros. Buques de la Marina de Guerra del Perú desde 1884. Dirección de Intereses Marítimos, 2000.
