= Christopher Tanner =

English rugby union player

Christopher Champain Tanner
- Chaplain Christopher Tanner
- Born: 24 June 1908; Cheltenham, England
- Died: 22 May 1941 (aged 32); HMS Kandahar, Mediterranean Sea off Crete
- Military career
- Allegiance: United Kingdom
- Branch: Royal Naval Volunteer Reserve
- Rank: Chaplain
- Nickname: Kit
- Conflicts: Second World War: Battle of Greece; Battle of Crete; Sinking of HMS Fiji (DOW)
- Awards: Albert Medal

Christopher (Kit) Champain Tanner, AM (24 June 1908 – 22 May 1941) was a Gloucester, Barbarians and England Rugby Union international, winning five caps between 1930 and 1932. He was posthumously awarded the Albert Medal for the rescue of around 30 sailors in the Second World War.

Tanner was educated at Cheltenham College and Pembroke College, Cambridge. He was ordained in 1935; served curacies in Farnham, Surrey and Gloucester; and was Priest in charge of St Christopher, Haslemere. In 1937 he married Eleanor Rutherford: they had one daughter born after his death in 1941.

In June 1940 he became a Chaplain with the Royal Naval Volunteer Reserve; and was awarded the Albert Medal for his work in attempting to save fellow shipmates when HMS Fiji was sunk during the Battle of Crete in May 1941. He succumbed to his exhaustion and died, aged 32, as soon as he was about to board HMS Kandahar. He is commemorated on the Commonwealth War Graves Commission Plymouth Naval Memorial. The rood cross at St Christopher, Haslemere is dedicated to his memory.
