= BAP Capitán Quiñones =

Peruvian naval ship

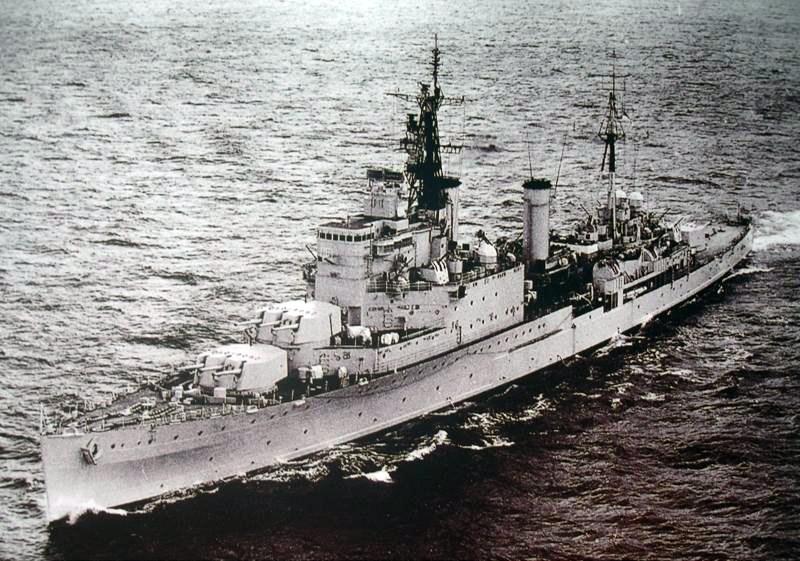

History

United Kingdom
- Name: Newfoundland
- Builder: Swan Hunter and Wigham Richardson Ltd, Wallsend
- Yard number: 1589
- Laid down: 9 November 1939
- Launched: 19 December 1941
- Commissioned: 21 January 1943
- Out of service: Sold to Peruvian Navy on 30 December 1959

Peru
- Name: Almirante Grau
- Acquired: 30 December 1959
- Commissioned: December 30, 1959
- Decommissioned: 2 May 1980
- Renamed: Renamed Capitan Quinones on 15 May 1973
- Reclassified: Static training ship in 1979
- Home port: Callao
- Fate: Scrapped 1979

General characteristics
- Class & type: Fiji-class cruiser
- Displacement: 8,712 tonnes standard; 11,024 tons full load
- Length: 169.3 m (555 ft)
- Beam: 18.9 m (62 ft)
- Draught: 5.3 m (17 ft)
- Propulsion: Four oil fired three-drum Admiralty-type boilers; four-shaft geared turbines; four screws; 54.1 megawatts (72,500 shp)
- Speed: 33 knots (61 km/h)
- Range: 10,200 nmi (18,900 km; 11,700 mi) at 12 knots (22 km/h; 14 mph)
- Complement: 730 (wartime); 650 (peacetime)
- Sensors & processing systems: Type 281 air search; Type 272 surface search; Type 277 height finding; Type 274 fire control (152 mm); Type 283 fire control (102 mm); Type 282 fire control (2 pdr)
- Armament: 3 triple Mk XXIII 152/50 mm guns; 4 twin Mk XIX 102/45 mm guns; 4 quadruple Mk VII 2 pdr (40 mm) pom-pom guns; 10 twin Mk II 20/70 mm guns; 2 triple 533 mm torpedo tubes
- Armour: 82.5-88.9 mm belt; 25.4-50.8 mm turrets
- Aircraft carried: Bell 47G helicopter (deck only)

BAP Capitán Quiñones (CL-83) was a Fiji-class cruiser in service with the Peruvian Navy. It was completed for the Royal Navy in 1942 as HMS Newfoundland and, after being withdrawn from service, commissioned by the Marina de Guerra del Perú on December 30, 1959. Renamed BAP Almirante Grau (CL-81), in honor of the Peruvian Admiral Miguel Grau, it arrived to its new homeport of Callao on 31 January 1960.

As fleet flagship, the ship participated in several exercises, including the multinational UNITAS manoeuvres. In 1963, after the creation of the Servicio de Aviación Naval (Naval Aviation Service), Almirante Grau started operating Bell 47G helicopters from its fantail. The ship was renamed Capitán Quiñones (CL-83) in 1973 after its former name was assigned to the recently acquired HNLMS De Ruyter of the De Zeven Provinciën class. As such it was passed to a reserve status on 6 March 1980 and decommissioned on 2 May of the same year.

== Sources ==
- Rodríguez Asti, John, Cruceros. Buques de la Marina de Guerra del Perú desde 1884. Dirección de Intereses Marítimos, 2000.
