= HMS Fiji =

Fiji-class cruiser

Coordinates: 34°35′N 23°10′E

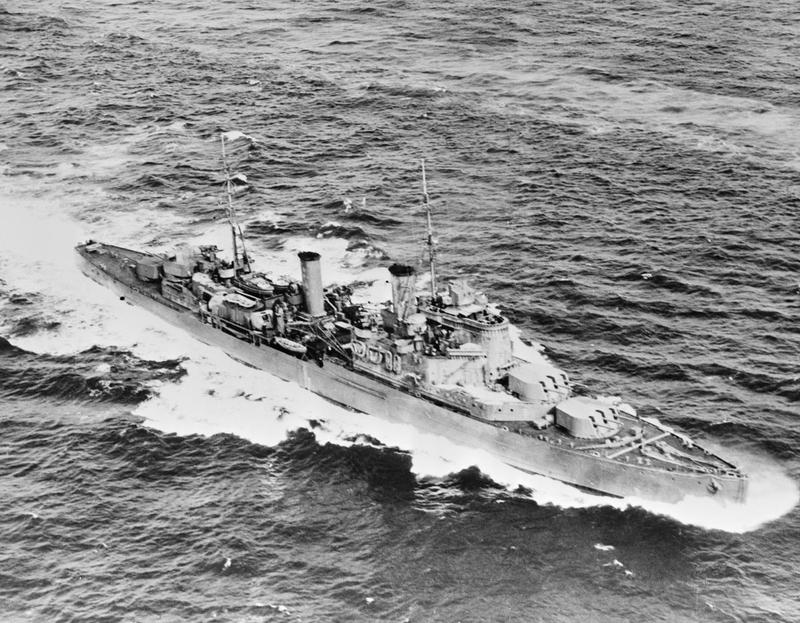
- Fiji in 1940

History

United Kingdom
- Name: Fiji
- Namesake: Colony of Fiji
- Builder: John Brown & Company, Clydebank
- Laid down: 30 March 1938
- Launched: 31 May 1939
- Commissioned: 5 May 1940
- Identification: Pennant number: 58
- Fate: Sunk by German bombers, 22 May 1941

General characteristics (as built)
- Class & type: Fiji-class light cruiser
- Displacement: 8,530 long tons (8,670 t) (standard); 10,724 long tons (10,896 t) (deep load)
- Length: 555 ft 6 in (169.3 m)
- Beam: 62 ft (18.9 m)
- Draught: 19 ft 10 in (6 m)
- Installed power: 4 Admiralty 3-drum boilers; 80,000 shp (60,000 kW)
- Propulsion: 4 shafts; 4 geared steam turbine sets
- Speed: 32.25 knots (59.73 km/h; 37.11 mph)
- Range: 6,250 nmi (11,580 km; 7,190 mi) at 13 knots (24 km/h; 15 mph)
- Complement: 733 (peacetime), 900 (wartime)
- Armament: 4 × triple 6 in (152 mm) guns; 4 × twin 4 in (102 mm) DP guns; 2 × quadruple 2-pdr (40 mm (1.6 in)) AA guns; 2 × triple 21 in (533 mm) torpedo tubes
- Armour: Engine and boiler rooms: 3.25 in (83 mm); Decks: 2–3.5 in (51–89 mm); Magazines: 2–3.5 in (51–89 mm); Gun turrets: 1–2 in (25–51 mm)
- Aircraft carried: 2 × seaplanes
- Aviation facilities: 1 × catapult, 2 × hangars

HMS Fiji was the lead ship of her class of 11 light cruisers built for the Royal Navy shortly before the Second World War. Commissioned in May 1940, she was initially assigned to the Home Fleet under the command of Captain William Gordon Benn (1889-1962) who had previously commanded the Revenge-class battleship Royal Oak sunk by U-47 in Scapa Flow. In August 1940, Fiji was detached to escort a force tasked to force French West Africa to join the Free French. On 1 September 1940, the ship was torpedoed by U-32 while en route, and was out of service for six months while undergoing repairs. With a new captain in command, Fiji was then assigned to Force H where she helped to escort convoys to Malta. The ship was transferred to the Mediterranean Fleet in early May 1941. After the Germans invaded Crete a few weeks later, she was sunk by German aircraft on 22 May after having fired off all of her anti-aircraft ammunition.

== Description ==
Fiji displaced 8,530 long tons (8,670 t) at standard load and 10,724 long tons (10,896 t) at deep load. They had an overall length of 555 feet 6 inches (169.3 m), a beam of 62 feet (18.9 m) and a draught of 19 feet 10 inches (6 m). The ships were powered by four Parsons geared steam turbines, each driving one shaft, using steam provided by four Admiralty 3-drum boilers. The turbines developed a total of 80,000 shaft horsepower (60,000 kW) and gave a maximum speed of 32.25 knots (59.73 km/h; 37.11 mph). Fiji had a metacentric height of 3.4 feet (1.0 m) at deep load. The Fiji class carried enough fuel oil to give them a range of 6,520 nautical miles (12,080 km; 7,500 mi) at 13 knots (24 km/h; 15 mph). The ships' complement was 733 officers and ratings in peacetime and 900 during war.

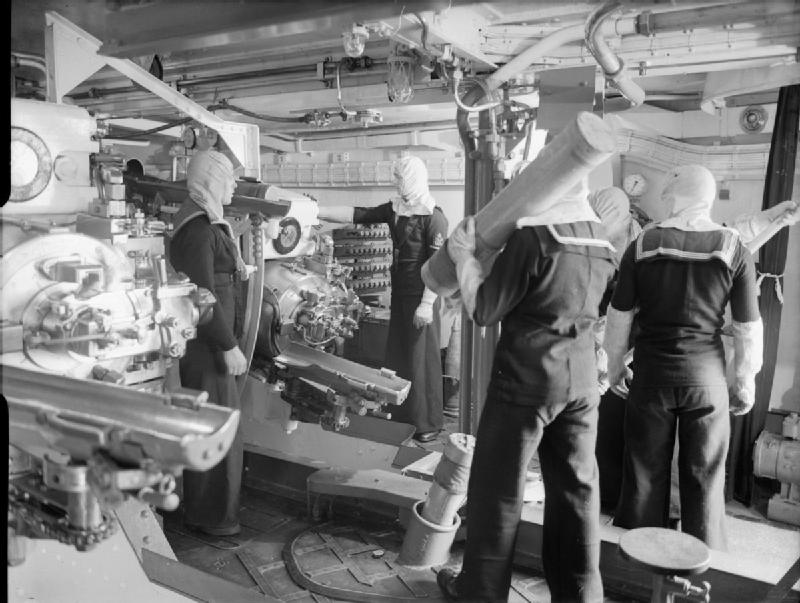
The interior of a 6-inch triple Mark XXIII mounting on board sister ship Jamaica. The crew is wearing anti-flash gear and the crewman in the foreground has over his shoulder a 30-pound (14 kg) cordite propellant charge.

The armament of the Fiji-class ships consisted of a dozen BL 6-inch (152 mm) Mk XXIII guns in four three-gun turrets, one superfiring pair fore and aft of the superstructure. Their secondary armament consisted of eight 4-inch (102 mm) Mk XVI dual-purpose guns in four twin turrets. Anti-aircraft defence for Fiji was provided by two quadruple 2-pounder (1.6 in (40 mm)) ("pom-poms") AA guns and two quadruple mounts for Vickers 0.5-inch (12.7 mm) AA machineguns. The cruisers also carried two above-water triple torpedo tube mounts for 21-inch (533 mm) torpedoes, one mount on each broadside.

The Fiji class lacked a full waterline armour belt. The sides of their boiler and engine rooms and the magazines were protected by 3.25–3.5 inches (83–89 mm) of armour. The deck over the propulsion machinery spaces and magazines was reinforced to a thickness of 2–3.5 inches (51–89 mm) and the main-gun turrets had only splinter protection 1–2 inches (25–51 mm) thick. They carried an aircraft catapult and two Supermarine Sea Otter or Walrus seaplanes.

== Construction and career ==
Fiji, the only ship of the Royal Navy to be named after the Crown colony of Fiji, was laid down by John Brown & Company at their Clydebank shipyard on 30 March 1938. The ship was launched on 31 May 1939 and completed on 5 May 1940. She was the first of the Fiji class to enter service (Royal Navy classes were generally named after the lead ship of a class). She was initially assigned to the Home Fleet under Captain William G. Benn. On 31 August 1940 she sailed for the African Atlantic coast to take part in Operation Menace, the attack on Dakar, but before she could join the taskforce, Fiji was damaged by a torpedo from the German submarine U-32 on 1 September and had to return to Britain for repairs, which lasted for the next six months. The torpedo hit abreast the forward boiler room and most of the force of the detonation escaped up the forward funnel, but the boiler room and an adjacent compartment flooded, reducing her speed to 11 knots (20 km/h; 13 mph). The flooding gave her a list to port; to counter it the ammunition from the forward turrets was thrown overboard and the portside torpedoes were ejected over the side. While under repair she was fitted with a Type 284 gunnery radar and another pair of quadruple Vickers 0.50-inch AA machineguns were added.

She returned to service in March 1941 and was assigned to patrol the Denmark Strait for German commerce raiders. She missed the homeward-bound heavy cruiser Admiral Scheer on 26–27 March, and in early April she was reassigned to Force H at Gibraltar to blockade the German heavy ships then stationed at Brest. With Force H, she sailed into the Mediterranean to support operations to relieve the island of Malta in late April. On 5 May Force H departed Gibraltar to escort a heavily laden convoy bound for Egypt (Operation Tiger); Force H only escorted the convoy halfway through the Mediterranean before the Mediterranean Fleet took over. Fiji joined the fleet at that time.

=== Battle of Crete ===
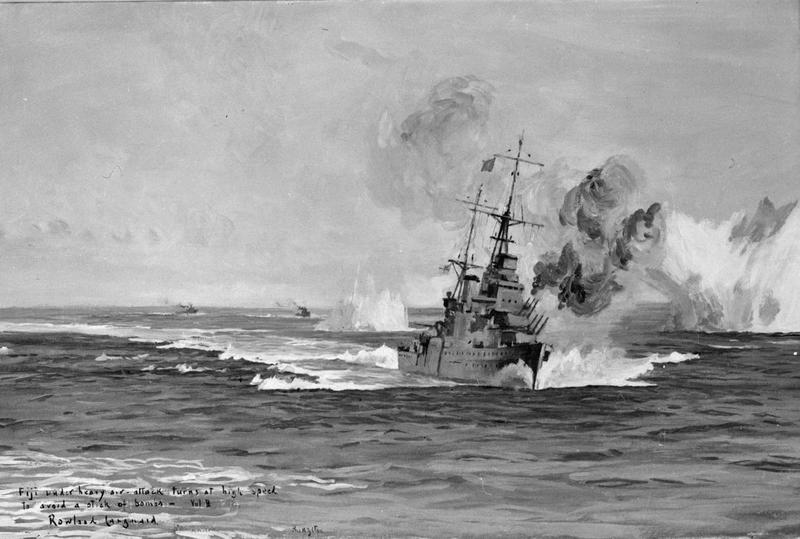
Fiji under heavy air attack (Painting by Lieutenant Commander Rowland Langmaid RN)

British intelligence anticipated that the Germans would attack the island of Crete on 17 May 1941 and Admiral Andrew Cunningham, commander of the Mediterranean Fleet, ordered his ships to sea on the 15th. Force B, Fiji and the light cruiser Gloucester were tasked to patrol west of the island. The Germans began landing paratroopers on 20 May when Force B was en route to rendezvous with the battleships Warspite and Valiant and their escorts west of Crete. The ships rendezvoused the following morning and German air attacks began a few hours later, although with little effect other than to help exhaust the ships' anti-aircraft ammunition. That afternoon, Cunningham ordered the cruisers to disperse into their original groups and search for any troop convoys in the Aegean. The Germans spotted Force B shortly after dawn on 22 May as the cruisers were steaming south to rendezvous with the battleships again. Fiji was not hit during these attacks, but was damaged by near misses that knocked out her aft anti-aircraft director.

Force B made the rendezvous with Force A1 (Rear Admiral H B Rawlings) and Force D (Rear Admiral Irvine Glennie) at about 08:30 and the combined force was ordered to report on their levels of high-angle anti-aircraft ammunition. Of the cruisers, Ajax had 40%, Orion 38%, Fiji 30%, Dido 25% and Gloucester only 18%. Ajax, Orion and Dido were ordered to return to Alexandria with Glennie's Force D to rearm but Gloucester and Fiji remained with Rawlings' Force A1.

At 12:25 Force A1, stationed 20 to 30 miles west of Antikythera, received a request from Rear Admiral Edward Leigh Stuart King to support the damaged HMS Naiad and the rest of his Force C. Force A1 headed east into the Kythera Channel, rendezvousing with Force C between 13:30 and 14:00. As the more senior admiral, King took command, with air attacks now inflicting damage on both forces. At 14:02 and 14:07 respectively, Fiji and Gloucester were detached to provide anti-aircraft support for the destroyers Kandahar and Kingston. The two destroyers having already been ordered to rescue the survivors of the destroyer Greyhound, which had been sunk at 13:50. Writing in despatches after the battle, Cunningham stated that King was unaware of the shortage of anti-aircraft ammunition in Fiji and Gloucester. At 14:13 King and Rawlings exchanged messages about the shortage of ammunition within both Force C and Force A1, with Rawlings expressing concern about the orders given to Gloucester and Fiji. Following this communication, King issued an order to recall both Gloucester and Fiji at 14:57.

The Luftwaffe focused its attention on the four ships dispatched to Greyhound and they were under near-constant attack for several hours. By 15:30, while attempting to rejoin Force A1, Fiji had exhausted her supply of 4-inch (102 mm) anti-aircraft ammunition and was reduced to firing practice rounds. She closed on Gloucester at 15:50, right when that ship was struck by four bombs and was near-missed by three others. Fiji dropped life rafts, but was forced to depart the area with the two destroyers. These ships fought on and shot down one attacker and severely damaged two others. The aerial attacks continued despite the heavy cloud cover; at 19:00 a Messerschmitt Bf 109 fighter bomber struck the cruiser amidships with a bomb. The forward boiler and engine rooms flooded and gave her a severe list. Despite this damage Fiji was able to maintain a speed of 18 knots (33 km/h; 21 mph) until another Bf 109 hit her with another bomb that increased her list to 30 degrees. Abandon ship was ordered in the face of the uncontrollable flooding and she capsized around 19:30. Her accompanying destroyers were unable to rescue any of the crew until after dark when almost all of them were recovered. Kit Tanner, the ship's chaplain, was posthumously awarded the Albert Medal (since replaced by the George Cross) for repeatedly entering the sea to rescue men from the water.

On 30 May 1941, in a letter to the First Sea Lord, Sir Dudley Pound, Cunningham wrote, "The sending back of Gloucester and Fiji to Greyhound was another grave error and cost us those two ships. They were practically out of ammunition, but even had they been full up I think they would have gone. The Commanding Officer of Fiji told me that the air over Gloucester was black with planes."

Following the loss of both Fiji and Gloucester to air attacks after their anti-aircraft ammunition was exhausted, all British cruisers were instructed to not allow their anti-aircraft ammunition reserves to fall below 40%.
