= Fiji-class cruiser =

Class of British light cruisers

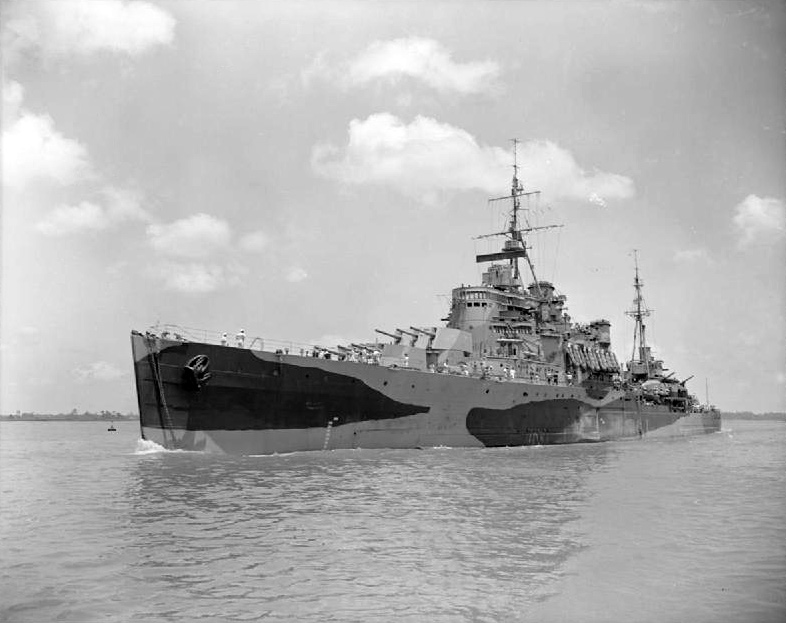
- Nigeria in 1943

Class overview
- Name: Fiji class
- Builders: Alexander Stephens and Sons (2); Devonport Dockyard (1); John Brown (2); Swan Hunter (3); Vickers-Armstrongs (3)
- Operators: Royal Navy; Royal Canadian Navy; Royal New Zealand Navy; Indian Navy; Peruvian Navy
- Preceded by: Dido class, Town class
- Succeeded by: Minotaur class
- Subclasses: Fiji; Ceylon
- Built: 1938–1943
- In commission: 1940–1985
- Completed: 11
- Lost: 2
- Scrapped: 9

General characteristics
- Class & type: Light cruiser
- Displacement: 8,530 long tons (8,670 t) standard; 10,450 long tons (10,620 t) full load; Later 10,830–11,090 long tons (11,000–11,270 t) full load
- Length: 555 ft 6 in (169.32 m) (o/a); 538 ft (164 m) (p/p)
- Beam: 62 ft (19 m)
- Draught: 16 ft 6 in (5.03 m)
- Installed power: 4 Admiralty 3-drum boilers; 80,000 shp (60,000 kW) (temperate) 72,000 shp (54,000 kW) (tropical)
- Propulsion: 4 shafts; 4 geared steam turbines
- Speed: 31.5 knots (58.3 km/h; 36.2 mph)
- Range: 10,100 nmi (18,700 km; 11,600 mi) at 12 knots (22 km/h; 14 mph)
- Complement: 730; 920 war time
- Armament: Fiji group: 12 × BL 6 in (152 mm) Mark XXIII guns in 4 triple mountings Mark XXI; 8 × QF 4 in (102 mm) Mark XVI guns in 4 twin mountings Mark XIX; 8 × QF 2 pdr (40 mm) Mark VIII "pom-pom" in 2 quad mountings Mark VII; 2 × triple 21 in (533 mm) tubes for torpedoes Mark IX; Ceylon group: 9 × BL 6 in (152 mm) Mark XXIII guns in 3 triple mountings Mark XXI; 8 × QF 4 in (102 mm) Mark XVI guns in 4 twin mountings Mark XIX; 12 × QF 2 pdr (40 mm) Mark VIII in 3 quad mountings Mark VII; 2 × triple 21 in (533 mm) tubes for torpedoes Mark IX
- Armour: Belt 3 1/2–3 1/4 in (89–83 mm); Bulkheads 2–1 1/2 in (51–38 mm); Turrets 2–1 in (51–25 mm); Ring bulkheads 1 in (25 mm) max
- Aircraft carried: Two Supermarine Walrus aircraft (removed by 1944, never fitted in Fiji or Kenya)

The Fiji-class cruisers were a class of eleven light cruisers of the Royal Navy that saw extensive service throughout the Second World War. Each ship of the class was named after a Crown colony or other constituent territory of the British Empire. The class was also known as the Colony class, or Crown Colony class. Developed as more compact versions of the preceding Town-class cruisers, the last three were built to a slightly modified design and were sometimes also called the Ceylon class.

== Design ==
They were built to the limitations that the 1936 Second London Naval Treaty imposed on cruisers, which lowered the limit for a light cruiser set in the 1922 Washington Naval Treaty from 10,000 tons to 8,000 tons displacement. Externally they appeared as smaller derivatives of the 1936 Town-class cruisers.

The Fiji-class cruisers however, like the Minotaur class that followed in the middle of the war, essentially carried the same armament on a 1,000-tons less displacement. The Fiji and Minotaur classes were very tight designs, built largely in war emergency conditions with little margin for any great updating postwar. The 62-foot (19 m) beam imposing crippling limits.

The Fiji class were distinguishable from the Towns as they had a transom stern and straight funnels and masts; those of the Towns being raked. The armour scheme was revised from that of the Towns; the main belt now protected the ammunition spaces for the 6-inch (152 mm) guns but the belt itself was reduced to 3.5 and 3.25 in (89 and 83 mm) in the machinery spaces. The 6-inch Mk XXIII gun turrets and ammunition spaces were laid out as per the Edinburgh group of the Town class, except the after turrets were positioned a deck lower as in the Southampton and Gloucester groups. The long trunk version of the triple 6-inch turret fitted to the Fiji class was 25 tons heavier than the 150-ton turret on the Group 1 & 2 Towns and further cramped the design. The supply of ammunition to the 4-inch (102 mm) guns was also improved, dispensing with the complicated conveyor system. To save weight, the aft director tower was removed and replaced with a simplified control system.

The machinery of the Fiji class was arranged to the 'unit system' of propulsion, as first adopted in the preceding 'Arethusa' class, with the machinery alternating between a boiler room and a engine room and grouped into two independent 'units.' Each unit consisted of two Admiralty Three Drum Boilers, operating at 400 psi / 700 f (able to 'cross connect' (provide steam too) the other unit if need so) powering four Parsons geared steam turbines, providing up to 20,000 shp per shaft turning at 300 rpm. Such an arrangement was designed to minimise the effects of a machinery hit, allowing the continued operation of the other, undamaged unit of machinery. However, this increased the space occupied by the machinery compared to the conventional arrangement, in part due to the need to organise the aft boiler room in tandem (as opposed to side by side in the forward room) to avoid interference with the outer shafts and the increase in subdivision. This arrangement also required an increase in engine room personnel. In addition, due to the wing compartments abreast the aft boiler rooms, the cruisers were left vulnerable to asymmetric flooding. While Admiralty calculations showed that the resulting list would be minor in the event of one flooding, war experience showed major damage would rupture multiple compartments, greatly exacerbating the damage and increasing the risk of capsizing due to the negative buoyancy of the other wing compartment. Whilst no Fiji type cruisers were lost this way, this would cause the loss of six other Royal Navy cruisers, primarily of the Dido class.

During the design process, a higher rate of boiler forcing was adopted (61 lbs/ft^{2}, from the prior accepted rate of 52 lbs/ft^{2}), in which exceeding even the rate reached by Royal Navy destroyers at the time. This allowed a higher power of 80,000 shp to be reached, as opposed to 72,500 shp at the prior rate of forcing in temperate conditions using the same boiler plant. (There was however an estimated 90 t increase in turbine weight).

Further savings in both space and weight were made by replacing the two diesel generators of the Town class with an all turbogenerator arrangement able to produce the same output (300 kw per unit, 4 per vessel).

The 80,000 shp powerplant of the Fiji class gave a design speed of 32.25 knots at standard condition and 31.25 knots at deep condition (excluding reserve fuel) in temperate climates.This higher power however could not be maintained in the tropics, with such dropping to 72,500 shp for a speed of 31.5 knots and 30.5 knots in respective conditions.

On trials off Anran, HMS Fiji made a mean speed of 30.769 kts at 72,600 shp (277 rpm) and 31.361 knots at 80,300 shp (284 rpm) at a displacement of 9,833 tons. HMS Kenya made 30.552 kts at 72,670 shp (277.2 rpm) and 30.821 knots at 76,504 shp (279.7 rpm). Paravanes were extended over both trials, leading to an estimated half knot of speed being lost.

Due to the limited size of the Fiji class, a number of the ships had their 'X' turret removed to fit additional light anti-aircraft (AA) guns. Ships of the first group were equipped with the High Angle Control System (HACS) for secondary armament AA fire while the Ceylon group used the Fuze Keeping Clock for AA fire control. Both groups used the Admiralty Fire Control Table for surface fire control of the main armament and the Admiralty Fire Control Clock for surface fire control of the secondary armament. By the late 1940s most of the Fiji class had the updated Type 274 'lock and follow' surface fire control radar, which massively increased the chance of hits from the opening salvoes. In the 1950s (except during the Korean War and Suez Crisis) no more than one of the MKXIII turrets was ever manned, with 'B' and 'Y' turrets mothballed due to the large number of crew required for their operation. This allowed for more liveable peacetime conditions by operating with a crew of 610–750 rather than the full wartime crew of 1,000–1,100.

== Modifications ==
The addition of radar sets meant that spotting aircraft were now surplus to requirements, allowing the removal of the aircraft facilities and catapult. Not only did this provide additional accommodation spaces for enlarged wartime crews, but there was no longer the need to carry large quantities of volatile aviation fuel; in 1940, Liverpool had her bow blown off when a torpedo detonated the 5,700 gallons of aviation fuel stored forwards and was out of action for a year. Fiji and Kenya had never received the catapult, Nigeria had hers removed in 1941 and the other ships had theirs removed between 1942 and 1944.

The Ceylon group were completed without 'X' 6-inch turret, and between 1944 and 1945, those of Bermuda, Jamaica, Mauritius and Kenya were also removed. This allowed the carriage of additional light AA weapons, a quadruple QF 2 pdr pom-pom mounting Mark VII generally being carried in 'X' position. Bermuda, Jamaica and Mauritius had 2 additional quadruple pom-poms added (for a total of five) and between two and four single pom-poms in powered mountings Mark XV. In Kenya, all pom-poms were removed, and were replaced with five twin and eight single 40 mm Bofors guns. By the end of the war, Newfoundland had one and Uganda had two American pattern quadruple 40 mm Bofors mounts Mark III and Nigeria had four single mounts Mark III. Generally, 6 to 24 20 mm Oerlikon guns were also added in a mixture of single mounts Mark IIIA and twin powered mounts Mark V.

Postwar modifications of the class were very limited with improved Type 274 lock and follow surface fire control. Newfoundland had a fragile and unreliable 'glasshouse' version of Type 275 for twin 4-inch control, (Note: The same was fitted to HMS Superb and Swiftsure) Ceylon had the short range type 262 MRS1 AA control which was limited to about 4 km (2.5 mi) range for tracking. Bermuda and Gambia had much more advanced US Mk 63 radar with four High Angle Director-Control Tower (DCT) and separate radar disks on the mounts themselves using systems that were released by the cancellation of HMS Vanguard's 1955 long refit. Slightly improved new versions of the basic twin 4-inch gun mounts were generally fitted in extended refits in 1950; these had electric drive and could train and elevate at 20 degrees/sec to track subsonic jets.

US advice and offers under mutual assistance to replace the obsolete and inaccurate 4-inch guns with twin 3-inch 50-calibre turrets of similar weight and dimensions as the RN twin 4-inch Mark XIX turrets were rejected because the RN had huge stocks of 4-inch shells. These ships would have been altered for water sprays to wash off nuclear fallout and received the Type 960 standard long-range air search radar. Newfoundland received a greater extent of electrical updating and rewiring with more comprehensive AA fire control and was the only Fiji-class vessel updated close to the standard planned for the improved Dido-class ships. The Fiji class were only refitted for shore bombardment and colonial patrol and presence. The mid-1950s refits of Ceylon, Gambia and Bermuda were very austere. They included increasing automation, the life of the geared steam turbines, and reducing manning below decks. There was simplification of the short range anti-aircraft defence to six to eight twin L/60 Bofors in Mk 5 twin mountings with a fire rate increased to 150 rpm per gun (280–300 rpm for each twin mounting). These would have stopped earlier WWII low-level or later Falklands War-type attacks, by which time the RN no longer fitted 40 mm, the last were withdrawn with HMS Bulwark in 1981.

== Service ==
They served with distinction during the Second World War. Jamaica took part in a number of operations, including driving off the heavy cruisers Admiral Hipper and Lützow in 1942, the sinking of the battleship Scharnhorst in 1943, and escorting carrier air attacks on the battleship Tirpitz in 1944. Fiji was sunk in 1941 by German aircraft during the battle of Crete. Trinidad was lost on Arctic convoy duty in 1942; sailing at reduced speed due to damage in a surface action earlier she was set on fire by German air attack and scuttled. The survivors continued in service after the war, taking part in further actions, such as the Korean War.

Ceylon and Newfoundland were sold to Peru in 1959 becoming the Coronel Bolognesi, and Almirante Grau respectively. These two were decommissioned by 1982. Nigeria was sold to India who had it reconstructed in 1954–7 to the same standard as Newfoundland. As INS Mysore, the ship was heavily used from the time of her transfer, seeing action in the 1971 war with Pakistan, and later converted to a harbour training ship in 1979. She was decommissioned by 1984 and then scrapped in 1985, and as such she was the longest-lived (41 years) member of her class.

All ships of the Fiji class were decommissioned from active service with the Royal Navy by 1962 and began being sold for scrap, though Bermuda was fully operational during 1961 and sometimes ventured to sea in 1962 as flagship of the Reserve Fleet. Gambia had been reduced to reserve in December 1960.

During the 1950s the larger Town-class cruisers were usually regarded as more habitable and comfortable in patrolling in the tropics and Far East, although being older their operational use generally ceased by 1958 and went for scrap the following year except for Sheffield (which had at sea deployments as a reserve flagship until late 1960 and was then, maintained as a reserve headquarters ship) and Belfast which stayed in active seaworthy service until 1963. Sheffield and Belfast were the last of the wartime commissioned cruisers considered capable of reactivation for GFS and were in semi maintained reserve until the election of the Labour Government in 1964, which immediately decided to scrap them, pending short term use as accommodation ships and consideration for historical preservation.

The last Fiji-class cruisers were seriously deteriorating due to being in an unmaintained extended reserve status many years. Gambia was considered as an alternative for use as the London museum ship, as the ship's condition was more original than Belfast, but Gambia was sold for scrap in 1968, because the state of the ship made it more expensive to preserve than Belfast. .

== Ships of the class ==
Name	Namesake	Builder	Ordered	Laid down	Launched	Commissioned	Fate
Fiji group
Fiji	Colony of Fiji	John Brown, Clydebank	20 December 1937	30 March 1938	31 May 1939	5 May 1940	Sunk in air attack during Battle of Crete, 22 May 1941
Nigeria	Colony and Protectorate of Nigeria	Vickers-Armstrongs, Walker	20 December 1937	8 February 1938	18 July 1939	23 September 1940	Sold to Indian Navy as INS Mysore in 1954
Mauritius	Crown Colony of Mauritius	Swan Hunter, Wallsend	20 December 1937	13 March 1938	19 July 1939	4 January 1941	Placed in reserve in 1952 and broken up at Inverkeithing in 1965
Kenya	Colony and Protectorate of Kenya	Alexander Stephens and Sons, Linthouse	20 December 1937	18 June 1938	18 August 1939	28 August 1940	Placed in reserve in 1958 and broken up at Faslane in 1962
Trinidad	Island of Trinidad (part of Crown Colony of Trinidad and Tobago (Note: In addition to HMS Trinidad, the other half of the colony was represented in the Royal Navy by the Colony-class frigate HMS Tobago))	HM Dockyard, Devonport	1 December 1937	21 April 1938	21 March 1940	14 October 1941	Scuttled in Arctic Ocean following air attack, 15 May 1942
Jamaica	Jamaica and Dependencies	Vickers-Armstrong, Barrow-in-Furness	1 March 1939	28 April 1939	16 November 1940	29 June 1942	Placed in reserve in 1958 and broken up at Dalmuir in 1960
Gambia	Gambia Colony and Protectorate	Swan Hunter, Wallsend	1 March 1939	24 July 1939	30 November 1940	21 February 1942	Served with the Royal New Zealand Navy as HMNZS Gambia 1943–1946; Placed in reserve in 1960 and broken up at Inverkeithing in 1968
Bermuda	Bermuda	John Brown, Clydebank	4 September 1939	30 November 1939	11 September 1941	5 August 1942	Decommissioned in 1962 and broken up at Briton Ferry in 1965
Ceylon group
Ceylon	Crown Colony of Ceylon	Alexander Stephens and Sons, Linthouse	1 March 1939	27 April 1939	30 July 1942	13 July 1943	Sold to Peruvian Navy as BAP Coronel Bolognesi in 1959
Uganda	Uganda Protectorate	Vickers-Armstrongs, Walker	1 March 1939	20 July 1939	7 August 1941	3 January 1943	Transferred to Royal Canadian Navy as HMCS Uganda in 1944
Newfoundland	Dominion of Newfoundland (Note: Due to a public finance crisis Newfoundland gave up self-government in 1933)	Swan Hunter, Wallsend	4 September 1939	9 November 1939	19 December 1941	21 January 1943	Sold to Peruvian Navy as BAP Almirante Grau in 1959

=== Fiji group ===
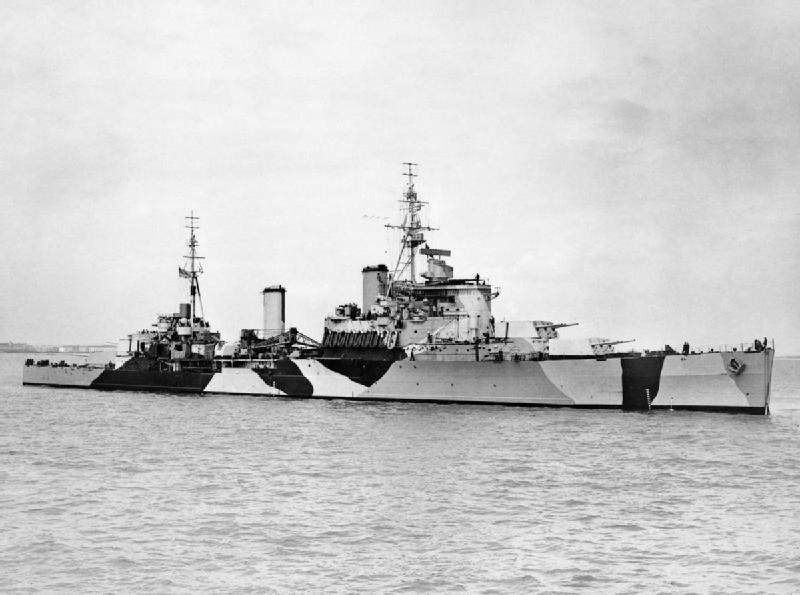
HMS Jamaica

- Bermuda – Took part in Operation Torch, the landings in North Africa, during World War II, as well as other operations. After the war, the ship continued in service, seeing much of the world, and receiving a number of refits which helped her last until her decommissioning in 1962. She was scrapped in 1965.
- Fiji – In 1940 Fiji was torpedoed by a German U-boat but survived. In 1941, during the Battle of Crete, Fiji was damaged by a bomb from a German Messerschmitt Bf 109 aircraft, after having survived 20 bomb hits, this one caused her to list; further bomb hits increased the list and the cruiser rolled over an hour later. 523 of her crew were picked up.
- Gambia – Was transferred to the Royal New Zealand Navy from 1943, seeing active service in the British Pacific Fleet. She was returned to the Royal Navy in 1946. The ship was scrapped in 1968.
- Jamaica – Served in World War II, taking part in a number of operations during that war, including the sinking of the battleship Scharnhorst at the Battle of North Cape, driving off German cruiser Admiral Hipper at the Battle of the Barents Sea, and escorting carrier air attacks on the battleship Tirpitz. In the Korean War, Jamaica was known as "The Galloping Ghost of the Korean Coast", due to the North Koreans claiming that she had been sunk three times. In 1955 Jamaica was used to play HMS Exeter in the film The Battle of the River Plate. She was scrapped in 1960.
- Kenya – Was heavily involved in World War II, being deployed to the Far East for some time. Kenya was also involved in the Korean War. She was scrapped in 1962.
- Mauritius – She was involved in the Normandy Landings, and other actions during World War II. She was scrapped in 1965.
- Nigeria – Was involved in Operation Pedestal (when she was damaged by Italian submarine Axum), the largest attempt to assist the besieged island of Malta in 1942. She participated in raids on Sumatra as part of the Eastern Fleet in 1945, as well as a number of other deployments. She was sold to India in 1958, being renamed Mysore. She was scrapped in 1985.
- Trinidad – In 1942 while engaging three German destroyers attacking convoy Convoy PQ13, she was hit by her own torpedo, which had a faulty gyroscope causing it to run in circles, though she did destroy one of the German warships. After temporary repairs in USSR, on return journey through Barents Sea to UK Trinidad was hit by a bomb from Luftwaffe Junkers Ju 88 bombers, further damaging her to an extent that she was scuttled with a torpedo the following day.

=== Ceylon group ===
- Ceylon – Was deployed to the Far East for much of World War II, and was heavily involved in the Korean War. She was decommissioned in 1960, and subsequently sold to Peru, being renamed Coronel Bolognesi. She was decommissioned in 1982.
- Newfoundland – She was torpedoed by the Italian submarine Ascianghi, receiving temporary repairs at Malta, and full repairs at Boston Navy Yard. In 1944, the ship suffered an explosion at Alexandria while docked there. She sustained heavy damage, and suffered a number of casualties. She was in the Far East from 1945, supporting a number of operations there, and was present at the Japanese surrender, being one of the few British ships able to reach Japan in time. She sank the Egyptian frigate Domiat, during the Suez operations, after the latter ship fired on her. She was sold to Peru in 1959, being renamed Almirante Grau and then Capitan Quinones in 1973. She was decommissioned in 1979 and scrapped in Japan, the country that she and her crew fought against in World War II.
- Uganda – Escorted RMS Queen Mary to Washington, D.C., with Winston Churchill embarked. Covered the invasion of Sicily in 1943. She was then hit by a German glide bomb that same year, causing significant damage and killing sixteen of her crew and wounding seven. Following repairs carried out in 1944 in the US she was recommissioned in the Royal Canadian Navy as HMCS Uganda. She joined the British Pacific Fleet in 1945 taking part in a number of actions in the Far East. She was put in reserve in 1947 but recommissioned as HMCS Quebec for service in the Korean War. The ship was scrapped in 1961.

== See also ==
- List of ship classes of the Second World War

== Bibliography ==
- Brown, D. K. & Moore, George (2003). Rebuilding the Royal Navy: Warship Design Since 1945. Annapolis, Maryland: Naval Institute Press. ISBN 1-59114-705-0.
- Campbell, John (1985). Naval Weapons of World War Two. Annapolis, Maryland: Naval Institute Press. ISBN 0-87021-459-4.
- Campbell, N.J.M. (1980). "Great Britain". In Chesneau, Roger (ed.). Conway's All the World's Fighting Ships 1922–1946. New York: Mayflower Books. pp. 2–85. ISBN 0-8317-0303-2.
- Friedman, Norman (2010). British Cruisers: Two World Wars and After. Barnsley, UK: Seaforth Publishing. ISBN 978-1-59114-078-8.
- Murfin, David (2010). "AA to AA: The Fijis Turn Full Circle". In Jordan, John (ed.). Warship 2010. Naval Institute Press. ISBN 978-1-84486-110-1.
- Raven, Alan & Roberts, John (1980). British Cruisers of World War Two. Annapolis, Maryland: Naval Institute Press. ISBN 0-87021-922-7.
- Rohwer, Jürgen (2005). Chronology of the War at Sea 1939–1945: The Naval History of World War Two (Third Revised ed.). Annapolis, Maryland: Naval Institute Press. ISBN 1-59114-119-2.
- Whitley, M. J. (1995). Cruisers of World War Two: An International Encyclopedia. London: Cassell. ISBN 1-86019-874-0.
