= BL 6-inch Mk XXIII naval gun =

Ordnance BL 6 inch gun Mk XXIII
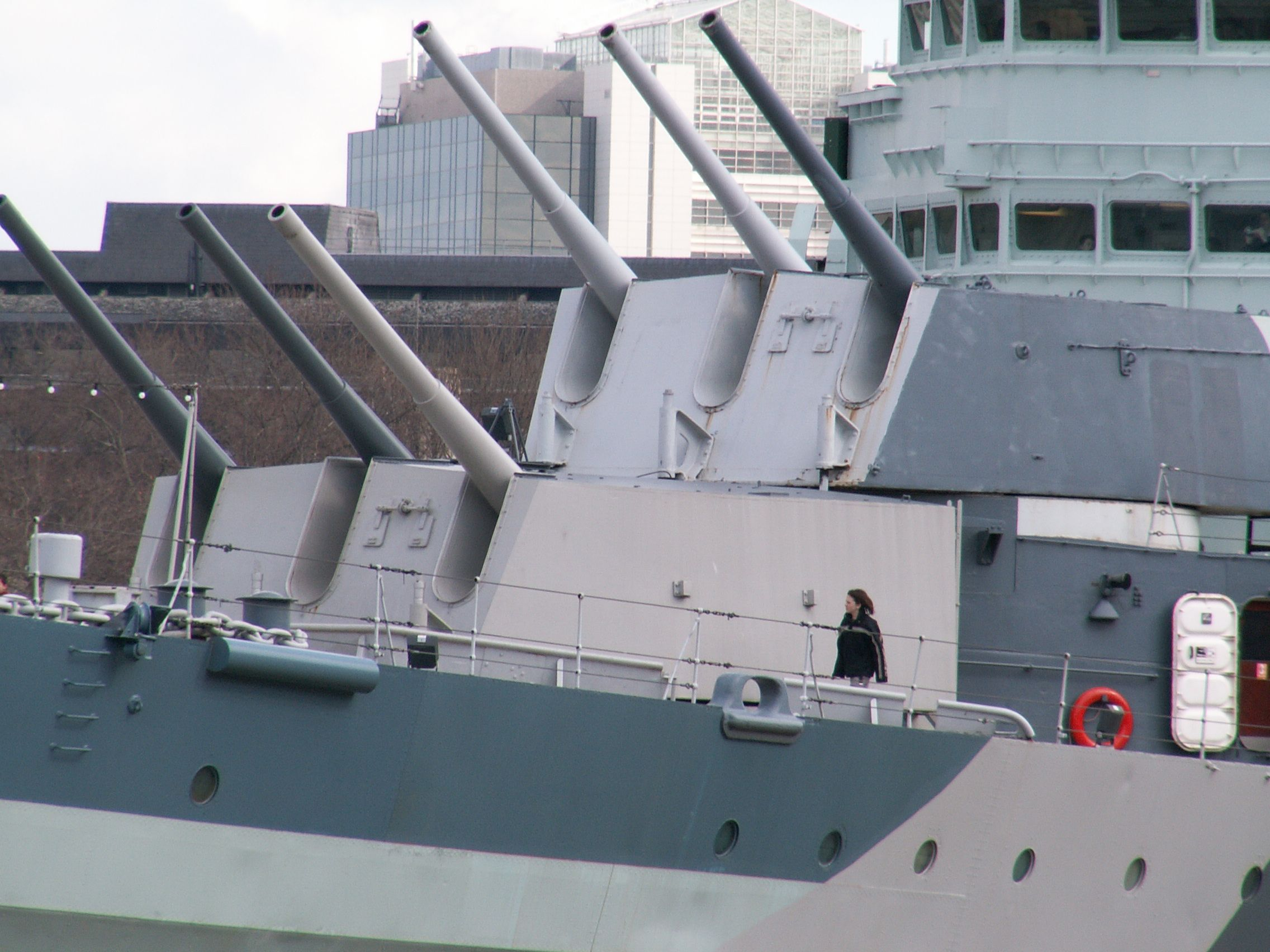
- Forward triple-gun turrets of HMS Belfast, March 2005
- Type: Naval gun
- Place of origin: United Kingdom

Service history
- In service: 1931–1985
- Used by: Royal Navy; Royal Australian Navy; Royal New Zealand Navy; Royal Canadian Navy; Indian Navy; Peruvian Navy; Republic of China Navy; People's Liberation Army Navy
- Wars: Second World War; Korean War

Production history
- No. built: 469

Specifications
- Mass: 7 tonnes
- Barrel length: 300 inches (7.6 meters)
- Shell: 112 pounds (51 kg)
- Calibre: 6-inch (152.4 mm)
- Muzzle velocity: 2760 feet per second (840 m/s)
- Maximum firing range: 25,480 yd (23,300 m) at 45 degrees elevation

The 50-calibre BL 6-inch gun Mark XXIII (Note: Mark XXIII = Mark 23. Britain used Roman numerals to denote Marks (models) of ordnance until after World War II. Mark XXIII indicates this was the twenty-third model of BL 6-inch gun.) was the main battery gun used on the Royal Navy and British Commonwealth's conventional (non-anti-aircraft) light cruisers built from 1930 through the Second World War, and passed into service with several other navies when ships were disposed of after the end of the War.

== Description ==
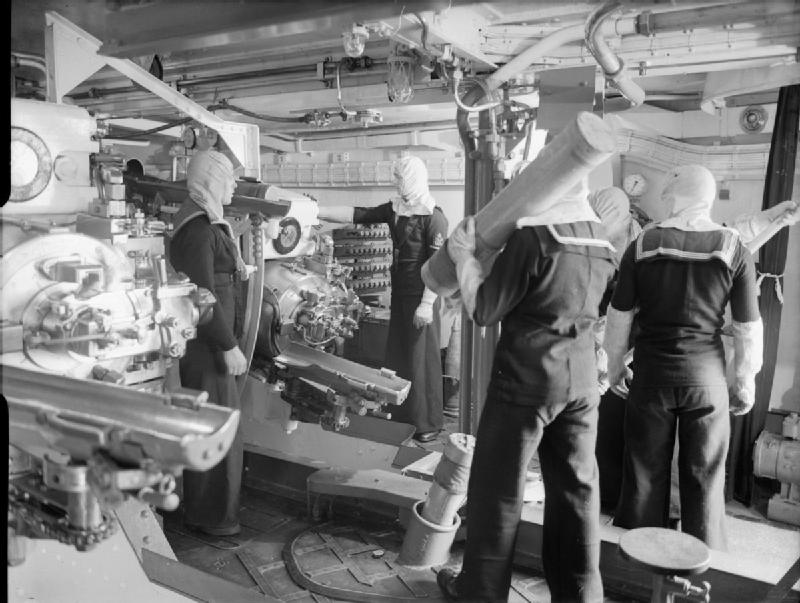
Handling cordite charges inside a Mk XXIII turret aboard HMS Jamaica, 1943

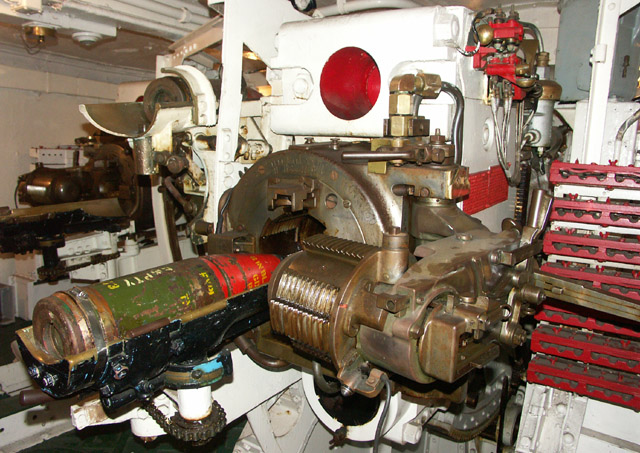
Breech with shell on loading tray of centre gun in a turret on HMS Belfast, 2006

The gun replaced the BL 8 inch Mk VIII naval gun used on earlier Washington Naval Treaty cruisers. These built-up guns consisted of a tube and 4.5-metre jacket with a hand-operated Welin breech block. Cloth bags contained 14 kg (30 pound) charges of cordite or flashless (NQFP) powder for a 51 kg (112-pound) projectile. Useful life of a barrel was 1,100 effective full charges (EFC) with standard cordite and 2,200 EFC with NQFP. The typical maximum rate of fire was eight rounds per gun, per minute. There were three mountings: the two-gun Mk XXI, the three-gun Mk XXII and the three-gun Mk XXIII. Depending on the mount elevation limits differed. The Mk XXI turret elevation limits were +60 degrees to −5 degrees, and the Mk XXII turret elevation limits were +45 degrees to −5 degrees. Loading could be accomplished at any angle up to +12.5 degrees, although the preferred loading angle was between +7 and +5 degrees for all three mounts. The Mk XXI and XXII mounts used a "short trunk" ammunition hoist while the Mk XXIII used a "long trunk" ammunition hoist system, which reduced the crew requirements and increased the speed of the hoists. A RN gunnery officer on HMS Bermuda gave details of the loading cycle which could be attained in the Mk XXIII turret with a well trained crew: "...a loading cycle of four and a half to 5 seconds was attained at low elevation, another two to three seconds being required with the guns elevated for long range. The time would lengthen as fatigue set in, but was creditable..."

== Ships mounting BL 6 inch Mk XXIII guns ==
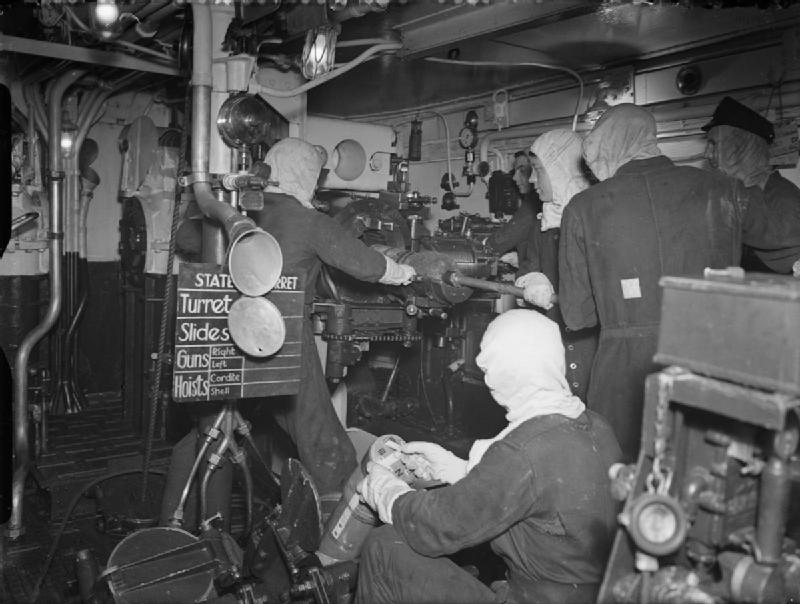
Inside a twin Mark XXI turret aboard HMS Orion, a Leander-class cruiser.

- Leander-class cruiser
- Arethusa-class cruiser
- Town-class cruiser
- Fiji-class cruiser
- Minotaur-class cruiser

== Shell trajectory ==
Range	Elevation	Time of flight	Descent	Impact velocity
5,000 yd (4.6 km)	2° 23′	7 sec	3° 0′	1,939 ft/s (591 m/s)
10,000 yd (9.1 km)	6° 15′	16 sec	9° 57′	1,371 ft/s (418 m/s)
15,000 yd (14 km)	13° 6′	29 sec	23° 38′	1,098 ft/s (335 m/s)
20,000 yd (18 km)	24° 7′	47 sec	39° 52′	1,087 ft/s (331 m/s)
24,500 yd (22.4 km)	41° 4′	71 sec	56° 27′	1,159 ft/s (353 m/s)

== Ammunition ==
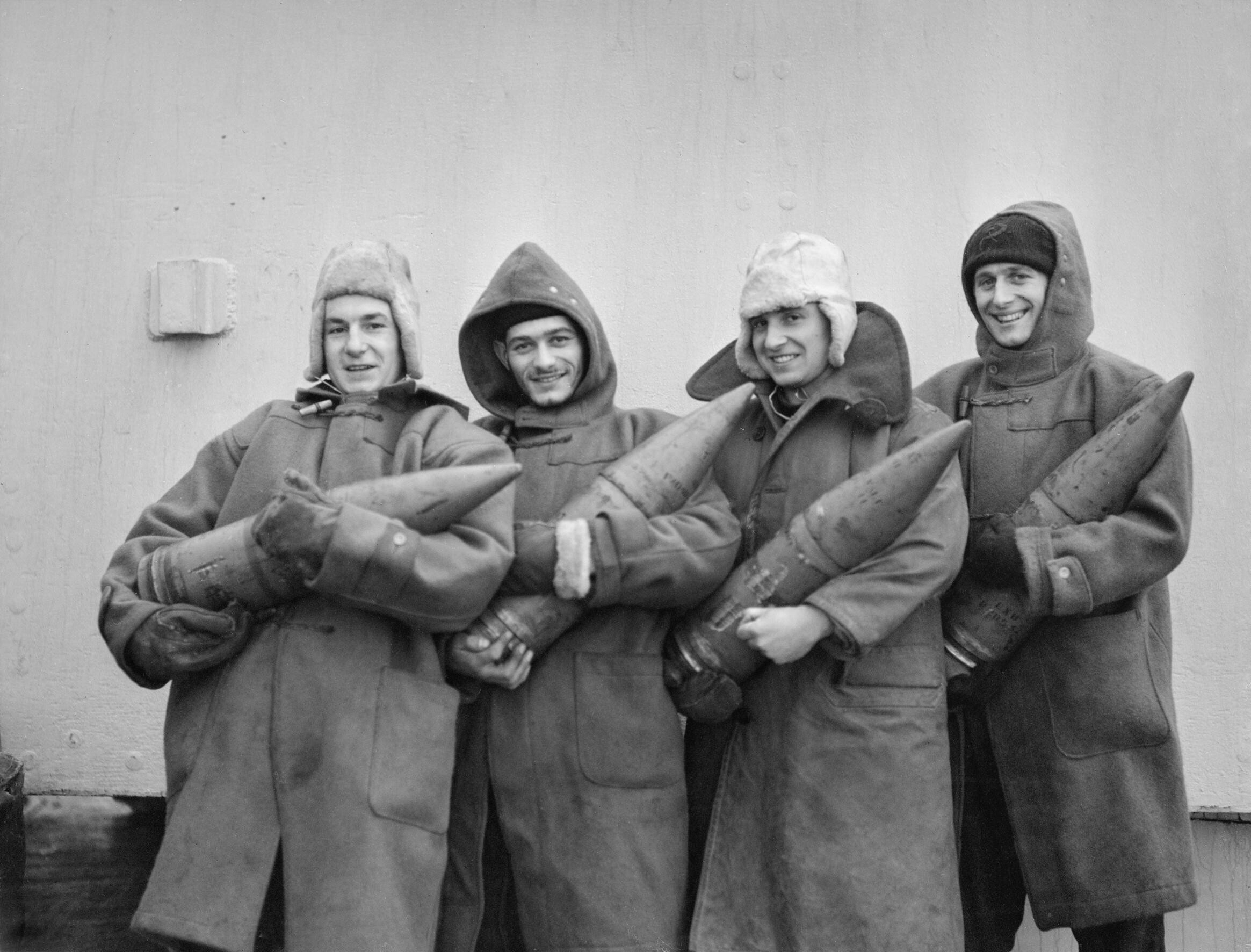
HMS Sheffield (C24) at Greenock, 10 January 1943, shortly after taking part in the Battle of the North Cape.

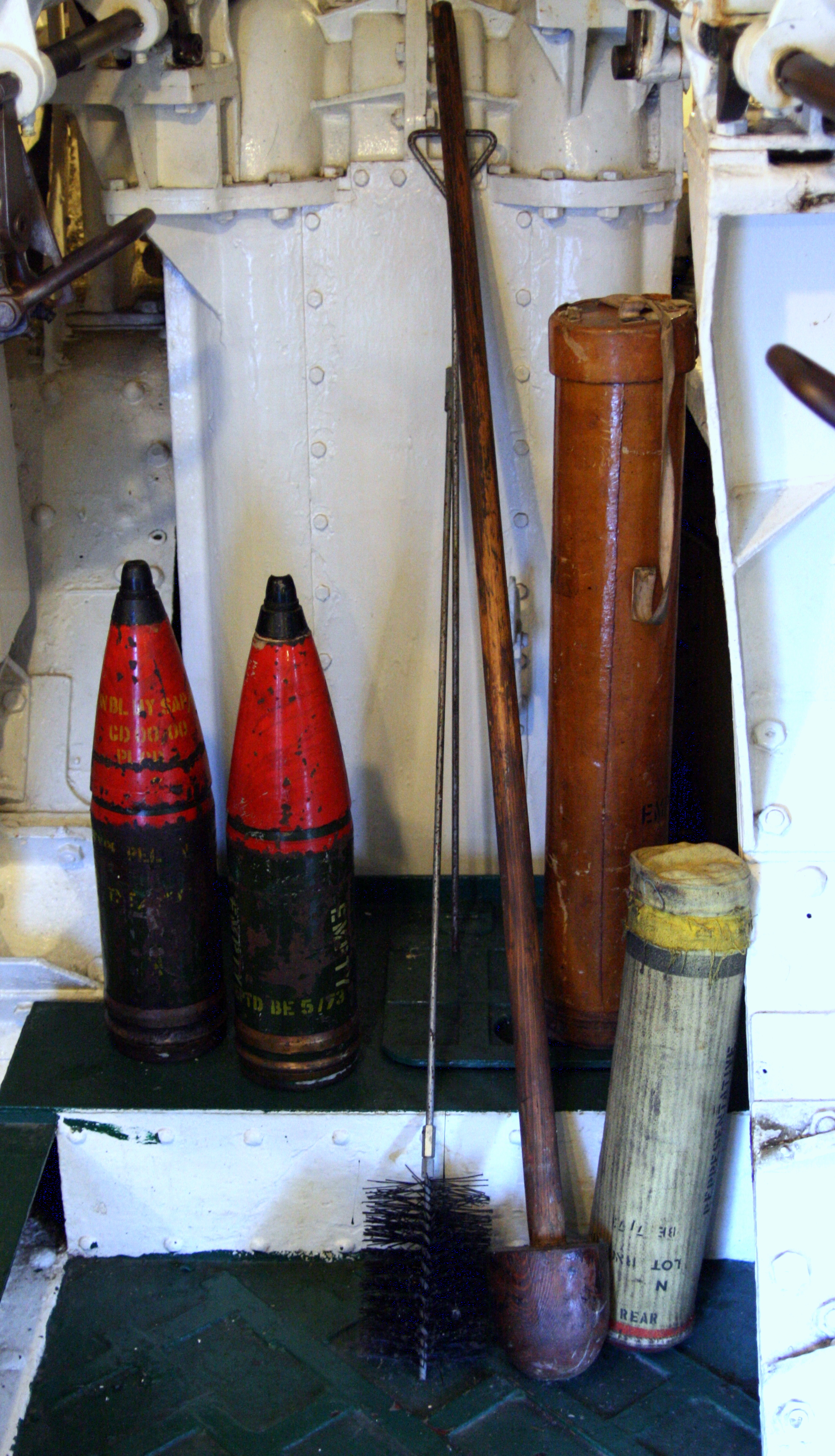
Gun turret showing shells and tools on board HMS Belfast (C35).

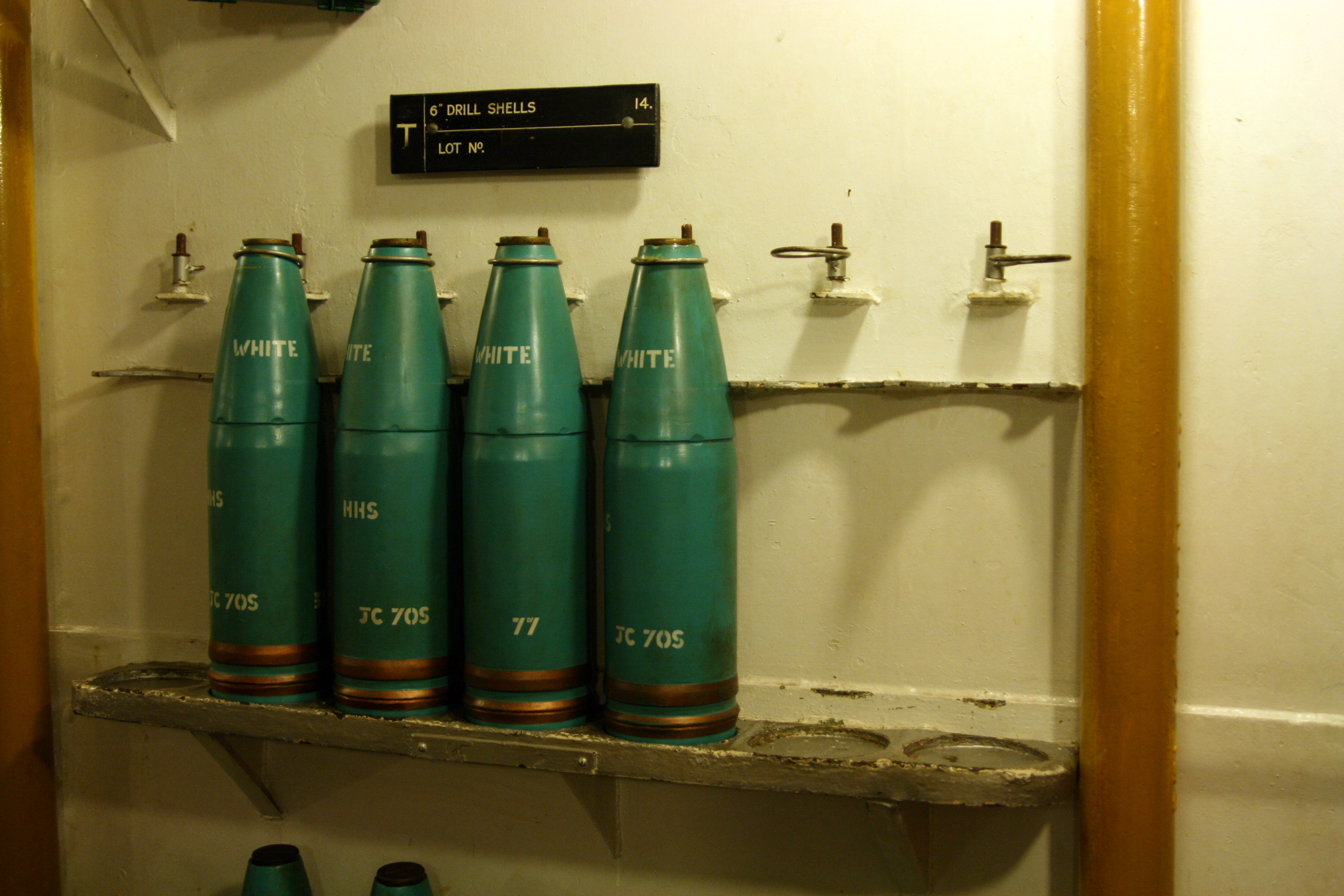
Shell room on board HMS Belfast (C35).

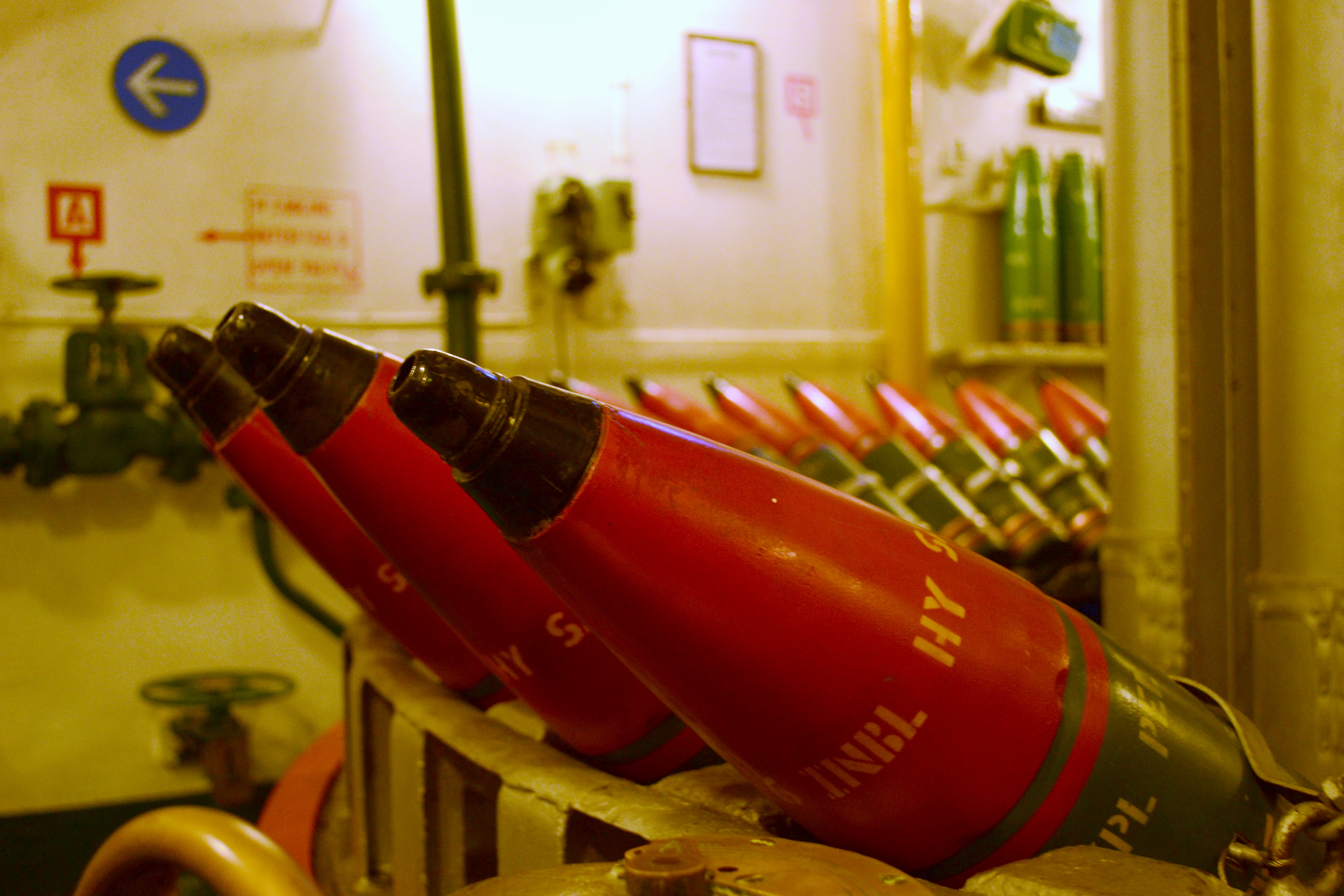
Naval shells on board HMS Belfast (C35).

== See also ==
=== Weapons of comparable role, performance and era ===
- 15 cm SK C/25: German equivalent light cruiser gun, operating at higher velocity
- 15 cm SK C/28: approximate German equivalent
- 152 mm /55 Italian naval gun Models 1934 and 1936: Italian equivalent operating at higher velocity
- 15.5 cm/60 3rd Year Type: slightly larger Japanese equivalent
- 6"/47-caliber Mark 16 gun: US equivalent light cruiser gun

== Surviving examples ==
- Y turret from HMNZS Achilles, later INS Delhi (1948), is preserved at the entrance to Devonport Naval Base, Auckland, New Zealand.
- A second turret from INS Delhi, is preserved at the Indian Military Academy, Dehradun.
- 12 guns and four turrets are preserved on the museum ship HMS Belfast in London, UK
- A number of Mark XXIIIs can also be found at English Heritage or other historical sites being used to represent earlier marks which were used as coastal artillery. Tilbury Fort, Essex, has one barrel; Coalhouse Fort, East Tilbury, Essex has two barrels; Gravesend, Kent, has one barrel; the Tynemouth gun emplacement has one barrel.
- One is on display at The Historic Dockyard Chatham, Kent, England. It is at the head of No.3 Dry Dock. Royal Navy 6" breech-loading Mk.XXIIIL WWII cruiser gun and the barrel is on 6" P Mk.XI (or P. XII. REGD. No 15) proof mounting as used at Proof and Experimental Establishment (P&EE), Shoeburyness, Essex, 1948-87.

== Bibliography ==
- Brooke, Geoffrey (1982). Alarm Starboard!. Cambridge: Stevens. ISBN 0-85059-578-9.
- Campbell, John (1985). Naval Weapons of World War Two. Annapolis, MD: Naval Institute Press. ISBN 0-87021-459-4.
- Lenton, H. T. & Colledge, J. J. (1968). British and Dominion Warships of World War Two. Doubleday and Company. OCLC 440734.
