= Marvel =

Marvel may refer to:

== Brands and business ==
- Marvel Entertainment, an American entertainment company
  - Marvel Comics, the primary imprint of Marvel Entertainment
    - Marvel Illustrated, an imprint of Marvel Comics
    - Marvel Press, another imprint
    - Marvel UK, an imprint formed in 1972 for the British market
  - Marvel Universe, a fictional shared universe
  - Marvel Music, an imprint of Marvel Comics
  - Marvel Productions, a former television and film studio subsidiary of the Marvel Entertainment Group
  - Marvel Toys, a former toy company
- Marvel Studios, a film and television studio that is a subsidiary of Walt Disney Studios
  - Marvel Cinematic Universe, an American media franchise and shared universe centered on a series of superhero films and television series
  - Marvel Television, a television studio subsidiary
  - Marvel Animation, an animation production company
- Marvel (food), a brand of milk powder produced by British-based Premier Foods

== Entertainment and media ==
=== Comics ===
- Captain Marvel (Marvel Comics), several Marvel Comics characters
- Marvels, a 1994 four-issue miniseries
- Ms. Marvel, several Marvel Comics superheroes
- Mary Marvel, a Fawcett Comics / DC Comics character
- Shazam (DC Comics), a fictional superhero formerly known as Captain Marvel

=== Music ===
- "Marvel", a song from the album Potpourri by P-MODEL
- The Marvels (band), a UK reggae group from 1962 to 1982
- The Marvelettes, a 1960s group briefly known as the Marvels
- The Marvels, backing group for Charles Lloyd from 2016
- Märvel (band), a hard-rock band from Linköping, Sweden

== Military ==
- HMS Marvel (1915), a Royal Navy destroyer
- USS Marvel (AM-262), a US Navy World War II minesweeper transferred to the Soviet Union under Lend-Lease

== Places ==
=== United States ===
- Marvel, Alabama, an unincorporated community
- Marvel, Colorado, an unincorporated community
- Marvel, West Virginia, an unincorporated community
- Marvel Cave, Missouri

=== Antarctica ===
- Mount Marvel, Oates Land

== Vehicles ==
- Marvel (automobile), built by the Marvel Motor Car Company in 1907
- Mississippi State University XV-11 Marvel, an experimental aircraft of the 1960s
- Roewe Marvel X, Roewe Marvel R, and MG Marvel R, electric sport utility vehicles manufactured by SAIC Motor

== Other uses ==
- Marvel (name), a list of people and fictional characters with either the surname or given name
- Marvel Gymnasium, a former multipurpose gymnasium in Providence, Rhode Island, US
- Marvel Science Stories, a pulp magazine
- Marvel Stadium, a multipurpose stadium in Melbourne, Australia
- Marvels (Theopompus), a work by the ancient Greek author Theopompus
- MARVEL transmembrane domain, as found in proteins such as CMTM2
- MARVELS (Multi-object APO Radial Velocity Exoplanet Large-area Survey), in astronomy
- Mars Volcanic Emission and Life Scout, one of four finalists proposed for the first Mars Scout Program mission
- Marvel HQ, the former name of Indian children's television channel Super Hungama
- Marvel, the Secret Service code name for Ivanka Trump

== See also ==
- Captain Marvel (disambiguation)
- Marvell (disambiguation)
- The Marvels (disambiguation)
- The Marvelettes
- Marcel (disambiguation)
