= Marvell =

Marvell may refer to:

== People ==
- Andrew Marvell (1621–1678), English metaphysical poet and politician
- Marcus Marvell (born 1970), English cricketer
- Marjorie Marvell (born 1938), Australian cricketer
- William Marvell (fl. 1715–1717), English executioner
- Marvell Scott (born 1973), American sports reporter and physician
- Marvell Tell (born 1996), American football player
- Marvell Thomas (1941–2017), American keyboardist
- Marvell Wynne (baseball) (born 1959), American baseball player
- Marvell Wynne (soccer) (born 1986), American soccer player, son of the baseball player

== Schools ==
- The Marvell College, a co-educational secondary school in Kingston upon Hull, East Riding of Yorkshire, England
- Marvell High School, Marvell, Arkansas, United States
- Marvell Academy, a private K-12 school near Marvell, Arkansas

== Other uses ==
- Marvell, Arkansas, a small city in the United States
- Marvell Technology, an American semiconductor company

== See also ==
- Marvell City, a shopping mall in Surabaya, Indonesia
- Marvel (disambiguation)
- Marville (disambiguation)
