= Marvel (name) =

Marvel is both a surname and a given name. Notable people and characters with the name include:

== Surname ==
- Andy Marvel (born 1958), American songwriter and music producer
- Carl Shipp Marvel (1894-1988), American polymer chemist
- Elizabeth Marvel (born 1969), American actress
- James Marvel (born 1993), Baseball pitcher
- John Marvel (1926-2013), American rancher and politician
- Kate Marvel, American climate scientist

== Given name ==
- Marvel (footballer) (Marvelous Antolín Garzón; born 2003), Moroccan born, Spanish association footballer
- Marvel Cooke (1903-2000), African-American journalist, writer and civil rights activist
- Marvel Crosson (1900-1929), American pioneer aviator
- Marvel Ekpiteta (born 1995), English footballer
- M. M. Logan (1874-1939), American politician
- Marvel Marilyn Maxwell (1921-1972), American actress and entertainer
- Marvel Moreno (1939–1995), Colombian writer
- Marvel Parsons (1914–1952), American rocket engineer, chemist, and thelemite occultist
- Marvel Rea (1901-1937), American silent film actress
- Marvel Smith (born 1978), former National Football League offensive tackle
- Marvel Williamson (born 1953), American academic

== Fictional characters ==
- Mr. Thomas Marvel, unwilling assistant of the Invisible Man (1897).
- Captain Marvel (disambiguation), various comic book superheroes
- Ms. Marvel, a Marvel Comics character
- Marvel Family, DC Comics characters
- Mary Marvel, a comic book superheroine
- Uncle Marvel, originally a Fawcett Comics character, currently owned by DC Comics
- Marvel, also known as Kal AOL, a character who appeared in Marville
- Professor Marvel, the touring magician/fortune teller in MGM's 1939 film The Wizard of Oz
- Marvel, a character in The Hunger Games

== See also ==
- Marvelman, a British comics character who, for legal reasons, had to change his name to Miracleman
- Marvel Man, a Marvel Comics character now known as Quasar
- Marvel Boy, a number of characters from Marvel and their predecessors
- Marvel Girl, three female Marvel Comics characters
- Black Marvel, a Marvel Comics superhero
- Blue Marvel, a Marvel Comics character
