= Volcano Radio =

Volcano Radio (ZD8VR)
- Saint Helena, Ascension and Tristan da Cunha
- Frequency: 1602 kHz

History
- Founded: 1958
- Last air date: 2009

Volcano Radio was a radio station on the British Overseas Territory of Ascension Island. The station aired pop music, with most of its disc jockeys being American engineers working on projects on the island and several US servicemen helping. The station's recorded programming and news came from the Armed Forces Radio & Television Service.

It was funded by the United States Armed Forces, with the station's only way of earning income being a weekly bingo game they ran. It was set up by RCA Records in 1958 and broadcast pre-recorded programming and music from 1958 until it shut down in 2009. Its medium wave transmitter was on the extinct volcano Green Mountain. The station was run by local volunteers and amateur disc jockeys. The station's theme tune was "This is Volcano Radio Station, the Voice of Ascension Island, South Atlantic Ocean".

In 1963, The Magazine of the Royal Navy's Communications Branch and The Royal Naval Amateur Radio Society described the station as the "loneliest commercial radio station in the world". The 1987 edition of the World Radio TV Handbook recorded the station's address as being the US Auxiliary Base on Ascension Island. In 1967, The Torquay Herald Express described the station as the "world's smallest non-stop pop radio".

== History ==
The station was set up by RCA Records in 1958, starting broadcasting in July of that year. In March 1962, the station became an "authorized outlet" of the Armed Forces Radio and Television Service, an agency of the United States Department of Defense. The station shut down in 2009, with their final broadcast stating "Volcano Radio: All good things must come to an end".
