= Marvels (disambiguation) =

Marvels is a 1994 Marvel Comics limited comic book series.

Marvels may also refer to:

- MARVELS (Multi-object APO Radial Velocity Exoplanet Large-area Survey), in astronomy
- Marvels (Theopompus), an ancient Greek work on history/mythology

== See also ==
- Marvel (disambiguation)
- The Marvels (disambiguation)
