= HMS Belfast =

Town-class light cruiser of the Royal Navy

Coordinates: 51°30′24″N 0°04′53″W

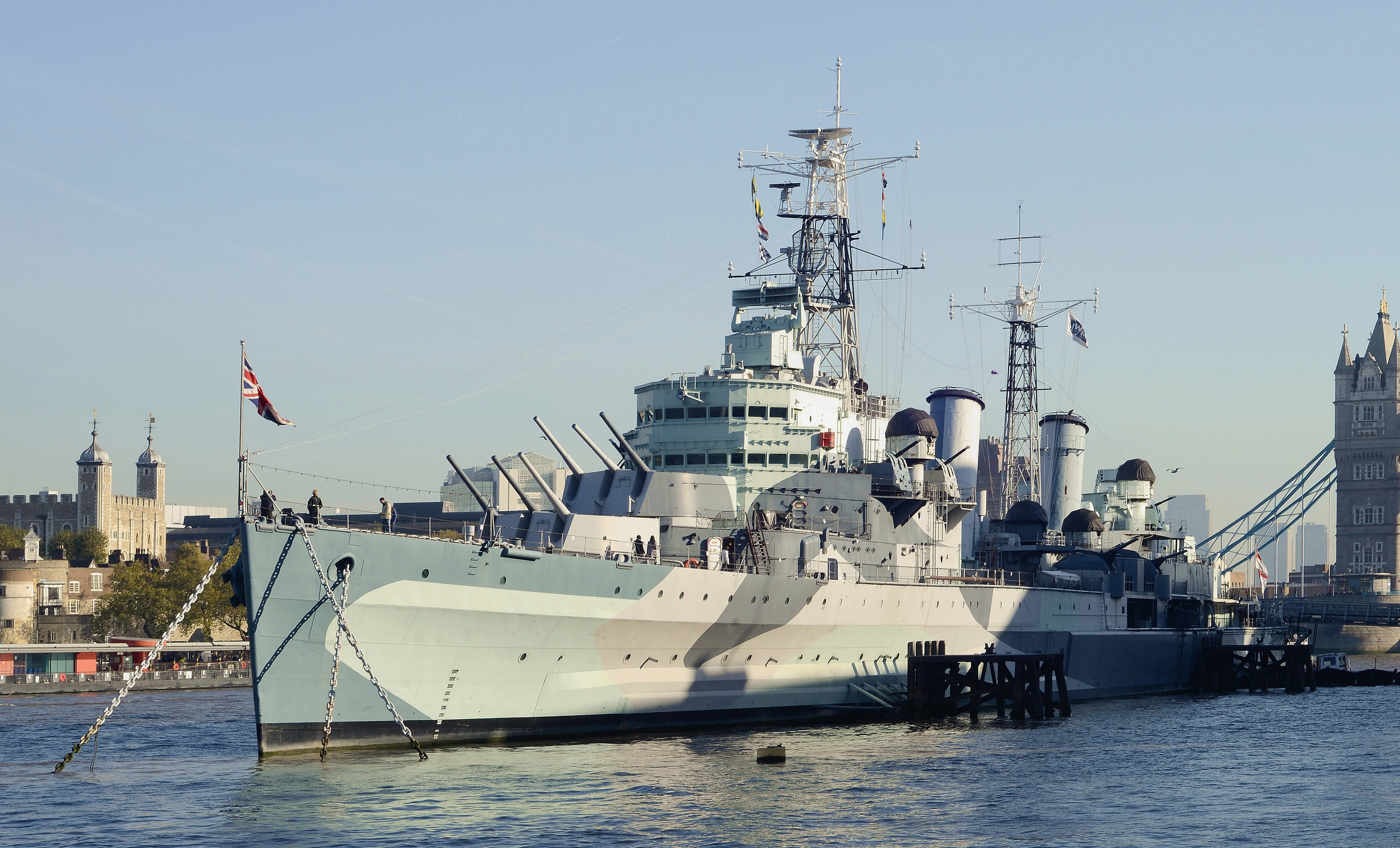
- Belfast in 2013

History

United Kingdom
- Name: Belfast
- Namesake: Belfast, Northern Ireland
- Ordered: 21 September 1936
- Builder: Harland and Wolff shipyard, Belfast, Northern Ireland
- Yard number: 1000
- Laid down: 10 December 1936
- Launched: 17 March 1938
- Completed: 3 August 1939
- Commissioned: 5 August 1939
- Decommissioned: 24 August 1963
- Identification: Pennant number C35
- Motto: Pro Tanto Quid Retribuamus; (Latin: For so much, how shall we repay?)
- Honours and awards: Arctic 1943; North Cape 1943; Normandy 1944; Korea 1950–52
- Status: Museum ship since 21 October 1971

General characteristics
- Class & type: Town-class light cruiser
- Displacement: 11,550 tons (14,900 full load)
- Length: 613 ft 6 in (186.99 m) overall
- Beam: 63 ft 4 in (19.3 m)
- Draught: 18 ft 3 in (5.56 m) forward; 19 ft 9 in (6.02 m) aft
- Installed power: 80,000 shp (60,000 kW)
- Propulsion: 4 × Admiralty oil-fired 3-drum boilers; 4 × Parsons single reduction geared steam turbines
- Speed: 32 knots (59 km/h; 37 mph)
- Complement: 781–881 (as flagship, 1939)
- Armament: 1939: 12 × 6-inch (152 mm) Mk XXIII guns (4×3); 12 × 4-inch (102 mm) Mk XVI dual purpose guns (6×2); 16 × 2-pounder (40 mm) anti-aircraft guns (2×8); 8 × 0.5-inch (13 mm) AA machine guns (2×4); 6 × 21-inch (533 mm) torpedo tubes (2×3)
- Armour: Main belt: 4.5 inches (114 mm); Main turrets: Up to 4 inches (102 mm); Decks over magazines: 3 inches (76 mm); Decks over machinery: 2 inches (51 mm); Bulkheads: 2.5 inches (63.5 mm)
- Aircraft carried: 2 × Supermarine Walrus (disembarked June 1943)
- Aviation facilities: 2 × hangars; 1 × catapult (removed 1945)

HMS Belfast is a Town-class light cruiser that was built for the Royal Navy. She is permanently moored as a museum ship on the River Thames in London and is operated by the Imperial War Museum. Construction of Belfast, the first ship in the Royal Navy to be named after the capital of Northern Ireland and one of 10 Town-class cruisers, began in December 1936. She was launched on Saint Patrick's Day 1938. Commissioned in early August 1939, shortly before the outbreak of the Second World War, Belfast was initially part of the British naval blockade against Germany. In November 1939, Belfast triggered a German mine, and in spite of fears that she would be scrapped, she spent more than two years undergoing extensive repairs.

Belfast returned to action in November 1942 with improved firepower, radar equipment, and armour. She saw action escorting Arctic convoys to the Soviet Union during 1943 and in December 1943 played an important role in the Battle of North Cape, assisting in the destruction of the German warship Scharnhorst. In June 1944, Belfast took part in Operation Overlord supporting the Normandy landings. In June 1945, she was redeployed to the Far East to join the British Pacific Fleet, arriving shortly before the end of the Second World War. Belfast saw further combat action in 1950–52 during the Korean War and underwent an extensive modernisation between 1956 and 1959. A number of further overseas commissions followed before she entered reserve in 1963.

In 1967, efforts were initiated to avert Belfast's expected scrapping and to preserve her as a museum ship. A joint committee of the Imperial War Museum, the National Maritime Museum, and the Ministry of Defence was established and then reported in June 1968 that preservation was practical. In 1971, however, the government decided against preservation, prompting the formation of the private HMS Belfast Trust to campaign for her preservation. The efforts of the Trust were successful, and the government transferred the ship to the trust in July 1971. Brought to London, she was moored on the River Thames near Tower Bridge in the Pool of London. Opened to the public in October 1971, Belfast became a branch of the Imperial War Museum in 1978. Since 1973, she has been home to the City of London Sea Cadets, who meet on board twice a week. A popular tourist attraction, Belfast received 204,656 visitors in 2025. As a branch of a national museum and part of the National Historic Fleet, Belfast is supported by the Department for Culture, Media and Sport, admissions income, and the museum's commercial activities.

== Design ==
Shells in a rack in the underwater magazine serving the "A" turret of Belfast

Belfast is a cruiser of the third Town class (named after towns, with no ship of that name). The Town class had originated in 1933 as the British Admiralty's response to the Imperial Japanese Navy's Mogami-class cruiser, an 11,200-ton cruiser mounting fifteen 6-inch (152 mm) guns with a top speed exceeding 35 knots (65 km/h; 40 mph). The Admiralty's requirement called for a 9,000-ton cruiser, sufficiently armoured to withstand a direct hit from an 8-inch (203 mm) shell, capable of 32 knots (59 km/h), and mounting twelve 6-inch guns. Seaplanes carried aboard would enable shipping lanes to be patrolled over a wide area and the class was also to be capable of its own antiaircraft (AA) defence. Under the Director of Naval Construction, the new design evolved during 1933. The lead ship of the new class, the 9,100-ton HMS Southampton and her sister HMS Newcastle were ordered under the 1933 estimates. Three more cruisers were built to this design, with a further three ships built to a slightly larger, 9,400-ton design in 1935–36. By 1935, however, the Admiralty was keen to improve the firepower of these cruisers to match the firepower of the Japanese Mogami-class and American Brooklyn-class cruisers; both were armed with fifteen 6-inch guns. The Admiralty rejected a design featuring five triple turrets as impractical, while an alternative design fitting four quadruple turrets was rejected, as an effective quadruple turret could not be developed. In May 1936, the Admiralty decided to fit triple turrets, whose improved design would permit an increase in deck armour. This modified design became the 10,000-ton Edinburgh subclass, named after Belfast's sister ship HMS Edinburgh. Belfast was ordered from Harland and Wolff on 21 September 1936, and her keel laid on 10 December 1936. Her expected cost was £2,141,514, of which the guns cost £75,000 and the aircraft (two Supermarine Walruses) £66,500. She was launched on Saint Patrick's Day, 17 March 1938, by Anne Chamberlain, the wife of Prime Minister Neville Chamberlain. The launch was filmed by Pathé News. From March to August 1939, Belfast was fitted out and underwent sea trials.

Diagram of one of Belfast's boilers

When completed, Belfast had an overall length of 613 feet 6 inches (187.0 m), a beam of 63 feet 4 inches (19.3 m), and a draught of 17 feet 3 inches (5.3 m). Her standard displacement during her sea trials was 10,420 long tons (10,590 t). She was propelled by four three-drum, oil-fired Admiralty water-tube boilers, turning Parsons-geared steam turbines, driving four propeller shafts. She was capable of 32.5 knots (60.2 km/h; 37.4 mph) and carried 2,400 long tons (2,400 t) of fuel oil. This gave her a maximum range of 8,664 nautical miles (16,046 km; 9,970 mi) at 13 knots (24 km/h; 15 mph).

Belfast's main armament comprised 12 Mk XXIII 6-inch guns in four triple turrets directed by an Admiralty Fire Control Table. With a rate of fire of up to eight rounds per gun per minute, her main battery was capable of a total maximum rate of fire of 96 rounds per minute. Her secondary armament comprised twelve 4-inch guns in six twin mounts. Her initial close-range AA armament was sixteen 2-pounder "pom-pom" guns in two eight-barrel mountings and two quadruple Vickers .50 machine guns. She also mounted six Mk IV 21-inch torpedo tubes in two triple mounts and 15 Mk VII depth charges.

Belfast was protected by a 4.5-inch (114 mm) main armour belt, with deck armour of 3 inches (76 mm) over her magazines and 2 inches (51 mm) over her machinery spaces. Her six-inch turrets were protected by up to 4 inches (102 mm) of armour.

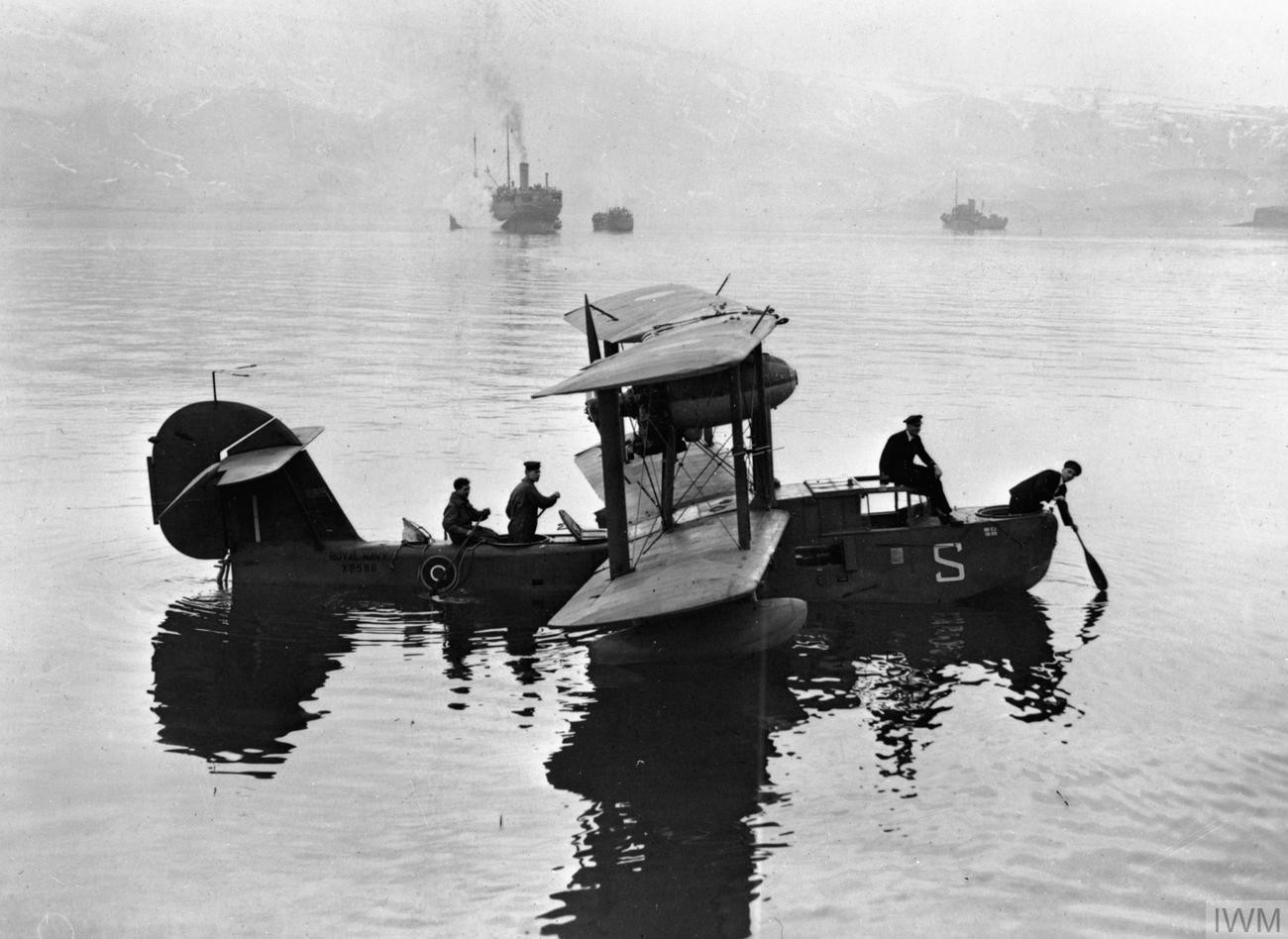
One of Belfast's Supermarine Walrus aircraft, photographed in an Icelandic fjord, 1942–1943

Belfast's aviation capability was provided by two catapult-launched Supermarine Walrus amphibious biplanes. These could be launched from a D1H catapult mounted aft of the forward superstructure and recoverable from the water by two cranes mounted on either side of the forward funnel. The aircraft, operated by the Fleet Air Arm's HMS Belfast Flight of 700 Naval Air Squadron, were stowed in two hangars in the forward superstructure.

== Second World War ==
=== 1939–1942: commissioning, prize capture, mining and repairs ===
Belfast departed for Portsmouth on 3 August 1939 and was commissioned on 5 August 1939, less than a month before the outbreak of World War II. Her first captain was Captain G.A. Scott with a crew of 761, and her first assignment was to the Home Fleet's 2nd Cruiser Squadron. On 14 August, Belfast took part in her first exercise, Operation Hipper, in which she played the role of a German commerce raider attempting to escape into the Atlantic. By navigating the hazardous Pentland Firth, Belfast successfully evaded the Home Fleet.

On 31 August 1939 Belfast was transferred to the 18th Cruiser Squadron. Based at Scapa Flow in the Orkney Islands, 18th Cruiser Squadron was part of the British effort to impose a naval blockade on Germany, which invaded Poland the following day; Britain and France declared war on 3 September. At 11:40 that morning, Belfast received the message "Commence hostilities at once against Germany". On 8 September, Belfast put to sea from Scapa Flow with the battlecruisers Hood and Renown, her sister ship Edinburgh, and four destroyers, on a patrol intended to intercept German ships returning from Norway. In particular, they were to search for the Norddeutscher Lloyd liner Bremen, which had left New York (without passengers) on 30 August 1939. The Royal Navy were unaware that the liner had already docked safely in Murmansk on 6 September. No enemy vessels were found. On 25 September, Belfast took part in a fleet operation to recover the submarine Spearfish, during which the ship was attacked by German aircraft, but suffered no damage. On 1 October 1939, Belfast left Scapa Flow for a patrol in the North Sea. On 5 October, she intercepted and boarded a neutral Norwegian factory ship that was sailing in company with six whaling ships. On 8 October, the ship sighted the Swedish merchant ship C. P. Lilljevach, but in poor weather, did not intercept or board her. The following day, she boarded Tai Yin, a Norwegian ship. Tai Yin had been listed by the Admiralty as suspicious, so a prize crew from Belfast sailed her to Kirkwall for investigation. On 9 October, Belfast intercepted a German liner, the 13,615-ton Cap Norte, 50 miles (80 km) north-west of the Faroe Islands. Disguised as neutral Swedish vessel SS Ancona, Cap Norte was attempting to return to Germany from Brazil; her passengers included German reservists. Under the Admiralty's prize rules, Belfast's crew later received prize money. On 12 October, Belfast boarded the Swedish ship Uddeholm, which was also sailed to Kirkwall by a prize crew. Returning to harbour on the night of 13–14 October, Belfast was among the few ships anchored in Scapa Flow, following intelligence reports of an expected air raid. That night, the battleship Royal Oak was torpedoed by German submarine U-47, which had infiltrated the anchorage. On the morning following the sinking, Belfast left for Loch Ewe.

On 10 November, Belfast was taken off the northern patrol and reassigned to the 2nd Cruiser Squadron, which was to form an independent striking force based at Rosyth. On 21 November, Belfast was to take part in the force's first sortie, a gunnery exercise. At 10:58 am, she detonated a magnetic mine while leaving the Firth of Forth. The mine broke Belfast's keel and wrecked one of her engine and boiler rooms. Twenty officers and men required hospital treatment for injuries caused by the explosion, and a further 26 suffered minor injuries. One man, Painter 2nd Class Henry Stanton, was hospitalised and later died of a head injury, having been thrown against the deckhead by the blast. The tugboat Krooman, towing gunnery targets for the exercise, released her targets and instead towed Belfast to Rosyth for initial repairs.

Initial assessments of Belfast's damage showed that while the mine had done little direct damage to the outer hull, causing only a small hole directly below one of the boiler rooms, the shock of the explosion had caused severe warping, thus breaking machinery, deforming the decks, and causing the keel to hog (bend upwards) by three inches. On 4 January 1940, Belfast was decommissioned to care and maintenance status, becoming the responsibility of Rosyth Dockyard, and her crew dispersed to other vessels. By 28 June, she had been repaired sufficiently to sail to Devonport, arriving on 30 June under the command of Lt Cdr H W Parkinson.

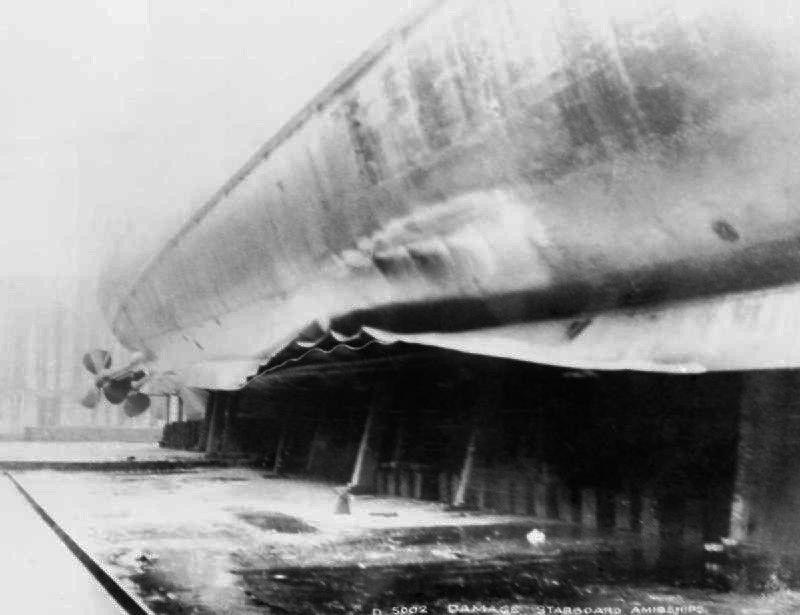
Photograph of Belfast's damaged hull, taken while the ship was drydocked for repairs

During her repairs, work was carried out to straighten, reconstruct, and strengthen her hull. Her armour belt was also extended and thickened. Her armament was updated with newer 2-pounder pom-pom mountings and her AA armament improved with eighteen 20 mm Oerlikon guns in five twin and eight single mountings, replacing two quadruple 0.5-inch Vickers guns. Belfast also received new fire-control radars for her main, secondary, and AA guns. Her November 1942 radar fit included one Type 284 set and four Type 283 sets to direct the main armament, three Type 285 sets for the secondary guns, and two Type 282 sets for the 2-pounder AA guns. She also received a Type 273 general surface-warning radar, Type 251 and 252 sets for identification friend or foe purposes and a Type 281 and Type 242 for air warning. Her 1942 electronics suite also included a Type 270 echosounder. Due to her increased topweight, a bulge was introduced into her hull amidships to improve stability and provide extra longitudinal strength. Her beam had increased to 69 ft (21 m) and her draught to 19 ft (5.8 m) forward and 20 ft 2 in (6.15 m) aft.

=== 1942–1943: recommissioning, Arctic convoys, and Battle of North Cape ===
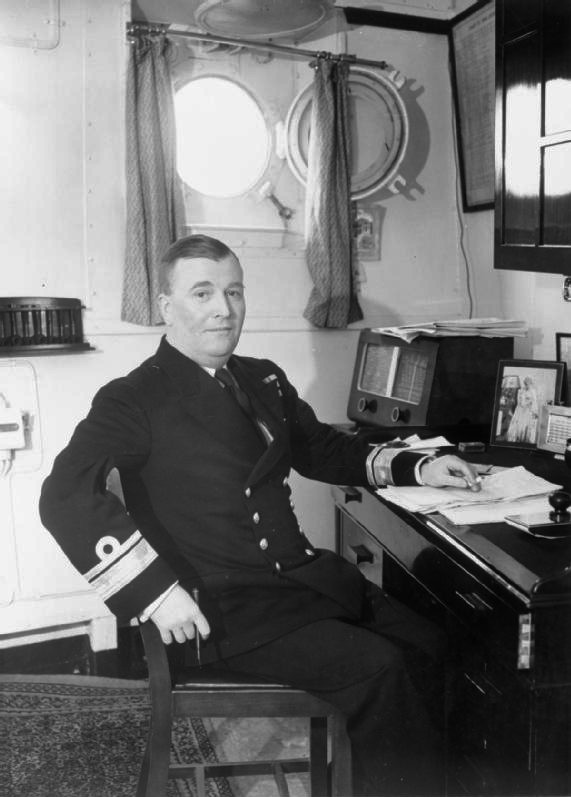
Rear Admiral Burnett in his cabin aboard HMS Belfast

Belfast was recommissioned at Devonport on 3 November 1942, under the command of Captain Frederick Parham. (Note: Parham recorded an oral account of his career in May 1976, which was later acquired by the Imperial War Museum.) On her return to the Home Fleet, Belfast was made flagship of the 10th Cruiser Squadron, flying the flag of Rear-Admiral Robert Burnett, who had previously commanded the Home Fleet's destroyer flotillas. The squadron was responsible for the hazardous task of escorting Arctic convoys to the Soviet Union, operating from Scapa Flow and bases in Iceland. Her radar suite reduced Belfast's need for aerial surveillance, so her aircraft were disembarked in June 1943. Belfast spent 1943 engaged on convoy escort and blockade patrol duties, and on 5–6 October of that year, formed part of the covering force during Operation Leader, an airstrike against German shipping in the waters of northern Norway near Bodø by the aircraft carrier USS Ranger.

On 26 December 1943, Belfast participated in the Battle of North Cape. This battle, which occurred during the Arctic night, involved two strong Royal Navy formations; the first, Force One, comprised the cruisers Norfolk (with 8-inch guns), Sheffield, and Belfast (the 10th Cruiser Squadron) with three destroyers; the second, Force Two, comprised the battleship Duke of York and the cruiser Jamaica with four destroyers. Bruce Fraser, C-in-C Home Fleet, expected and hoped that the German battleship Scharnhorst would sortie from its Norwegian base and attempt to attack Convoy JW 55B sailing from Scotland to Murmansk in the USSR, and indeed on 1943 Christmas Day, Scharnhorst left port in northern Norway to attack Convoy JW 55B. The next day, Force One, which had left Murmansk on the 23rd, encountered Scharnhorst, prevented her from attacking the convoy, and forced her to retreat after being damaged by the British cruisers. As Scharnhorst attacked again at noon, she was intercepted by Force Two and sunk by the combined formations. Belfast played an important role in the battle; as flagship of the 10th Cruiser Squadron, she was among the first to encounter Scharnhorst and coordinated the squadron's defence of the convoy. After Scharnhorst turned away from the convoy, Admiral Burnett in Belfast shadowed her by radar from outside visual range, enabling her interception by Duke of York.

=== 1944: Tirpitz and D-Day ===
After North Cape, Belfast refuelled at Kola Inlet before sailing for the United Kingdom, arriving at Scapa to replenish her fuel, ammunition, and stores on New Year's Day 1944. Belfast sailed to Rosyth on 10 January, where her crew received a period of leave. February 1944 had Belfast resume her Arctic convoy duties, and on 30 March 1944, Belfast sailed with the covering force of Operation Tungsten, a large carrier-launched Fleet Air Arm airstrike against the German battleship Tirpitz. Moored in Altafjord in northern Norway, Tirpitz was the German navy's last surviving capital ship. Forty-two Fairey Barracuda dive bombers from HMS Victorious and HMS Furious made up the strike force, escorted by 80 fighters. Launched on 3 April, the bombers scored 14 hits, immobilising Tirpitz for two months, with one Barracuda shot down. Belfast underwent minor repairs at Rosyth from 23 April to 8 May, while her crew received a period of leave. On 8 May, Belfast returned to Scapa Flow and carried the King during his preinvasion visit to the Home Fleet.

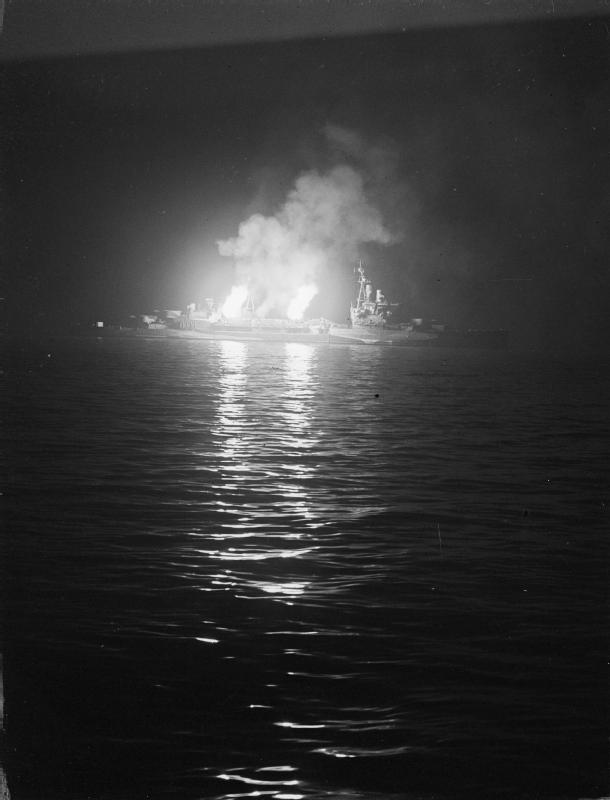
HMS Belfast's 4-inch guns bombarding German positions in Normandy at night

For the invasion of Normandy Belfast, flying the flag of Rear-Admiral Frederick Dalrymple-Hamilton, was made headquarters ship of Bombardment Force E and was to support landings by British and Canadian forces in the Gold and Juno Beach sectors. On 2 June, Belfast left the River Clyde for her bombardment areas. That morning, Prime Minister Winston Churchill had announced his intention to go to sea with the fleet and witness the invasion from HMS Belfast. This was opposed by the Supreme Allied Commander, General Dwight D. Eisenhower, and the First Sea Lord, Sir Andrew Cunningham. An intervention by the King eventually prevented Churchill from going.

The invasion was to begin on 5 June, but bad weather forced a 24-hour delay. At 5:30 am on 6 June, Belfast opened fire on a German artillery battery at Ver-sur-Mer, suppressing the guns until the site was overrun by British infantry of 7th Battalion, Green Howards. On 12 June, Belfast supported Canadian troops moving inland from Juno Beach, and she returned to Portsmouth on 16 June to replenish her ammunition. She returned two days later for further bombardments. On the night of 6 July, Belfast was threatened at anchor by German motor torpedo boats ("E-boats"). She evaded them by weighing anchor and moving to the concealment of a smoke screen. Belfast fired her last round in anger in European waters on 8 July, in company with the monitor HMS Roberts and the battleship HMS Rodney, as part of Operation Charnwood. (Note: A 15-inch gun from HMS Roberts is one of the pair now on display outside the Imperial War Museum.) On 10 July, she sailed for Scapa, the fighting in France having moved inland beyond the range of her guns. During her five weeks off Normandy, Belfast had fired 1,996 rounds from her six-inch guns.

=== 1945: Service in the Far East ===
On 29 July 1944, Captain Parham handed over command of HMS Belfast to Captain R.M. Dick, and until April 1945, Belfast underwent a refit to prepare for service against Japan in the Far East, which improved her accommodation for tropical conditions and updated her AA armament and fire control to counter expected kamikaze attacks by Japanese aircraft. By May 1945, Belfast mounted thirty-six 2-pounder guns in two eight-gun mounts, four quadruple mounts, and four single mounts. She also mounted fourteen 20 mm Oerlikons. Her two aftmost 4-inch mountings were removed and the remainder fitted with remote power control. Her empty hangars were converted to crew accommodations, and her aircraft catapult was removed.

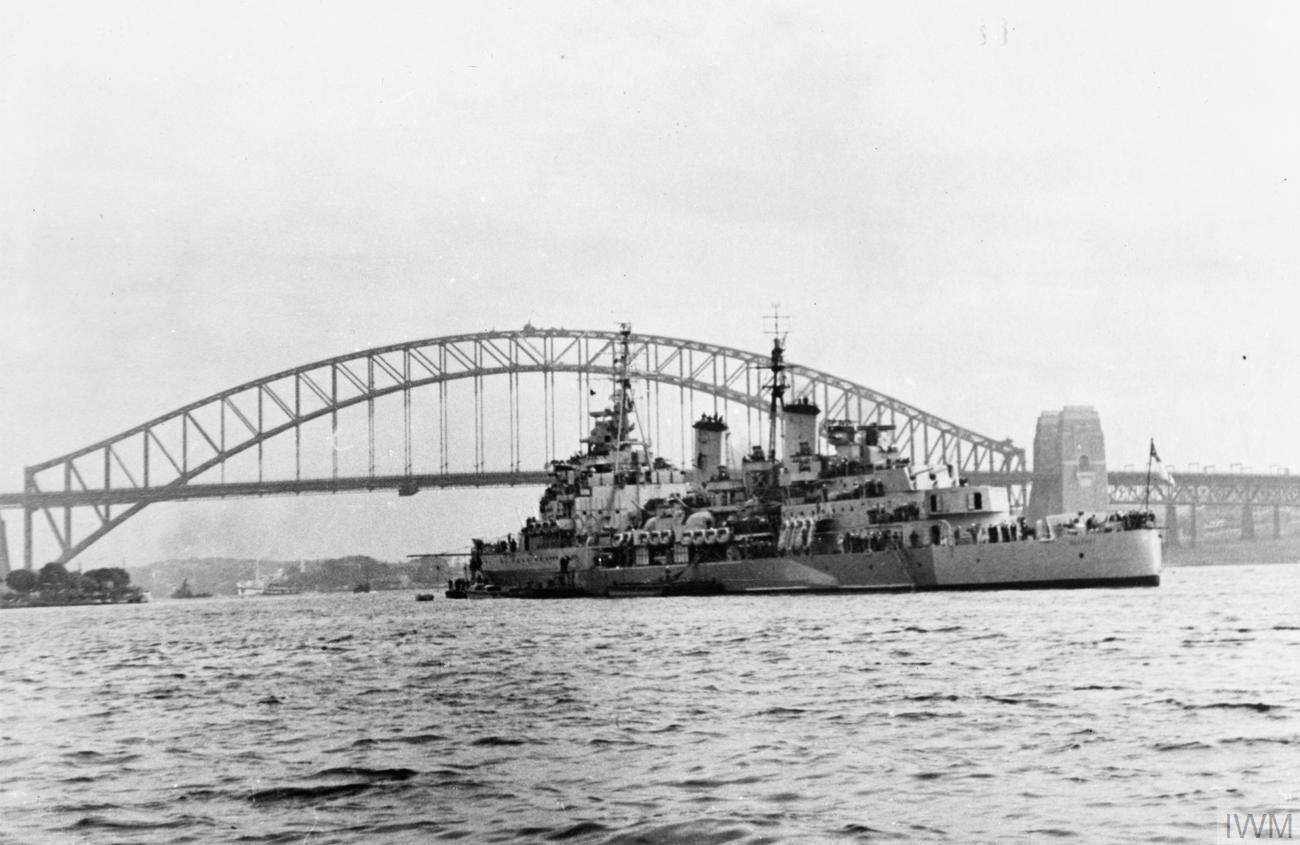
Belfast at anchor in Sydney Harbour, August 1945.

Her radar fit now included a Type 277 radar set to replace her Type 273 for surface warning. Her Type 281 air warning set was replaced by a single-antenna Type 281B set, while a Type 293Q was fitted for close-range height-finding and surface warning. A Type 274 set was fitted for main armament fire direction. On 17 June 1945, with the war in Europe at an end, Belfast sailed for the Far East via Gibraltar, Malta, Alexandria, Port Said, Aden, Colombo, and Sydney. By the time she arrived in Sydney on 7 August, Belfast had been made flagship of the 2nd Cruiser Squadron of the British Pacific Fleet. While in Sydney, Belfast underwent another short refit, supplementing her close-range armament with five 40 mm Bofors guns. Belfast had been expected to join in Operation Downfall, but this was forestalled by the Japanese surrender on 15 August 1945.

== Post-war service 1945–1950 ==
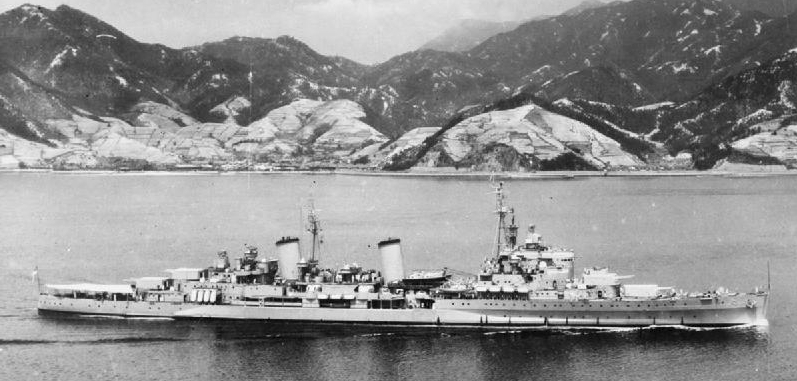
Belfast arrived at Kure, Japan, in May 1950.

With the end of the war, Belfast remained in the Far East, conducting a number of cruises to ports in Japan, China, and Malaya and sailing for Portsmouth on 20 August 1947. There, she paid off into reserve and underwent a refit during which her turbines were opened for maintenance. She also received two more single Bofors guns, in place of two of her single 2-pounder mountings. She was recommissioned on 22 September 1948, and before returning to the Far East, visited her home city of Belfast, arriving on 20 October. The following day, the ship's company marked Trafalgar Day with a march through the city. The next day, Belfast took charge of a silver ship's bell, a gift of the people of Belfast. She sailed for Hong Kong on 23 October to join the Royal Navy's Far East Fleet, arriving in late December. By 1949, the political situation in China was precarious, with the Chinese Civil War moving towards its conclusion. As flagship of the 5th Cruiser Squadron, Belfast was the Far Eastern Station's headquarters ship during the April 1949 Amethyst Incident, in which a British sloop, HMS Amethyst, was trapped in the Yangtze River by the communist People's Liberation Army. Belfast remained in Hong Kong during 1949, sailing for Singapore on 18 January 1950. There, she underwent a minor refit between January and March 1950, and in June, she joined the Far East Fleet's summer cruise. On 25 June 1950, while Belfast was visiting Hakodate in Japan, North Korean forces crossed the 38th Parallel, starting the Korean War.

== Korean War 1950–1952 ==
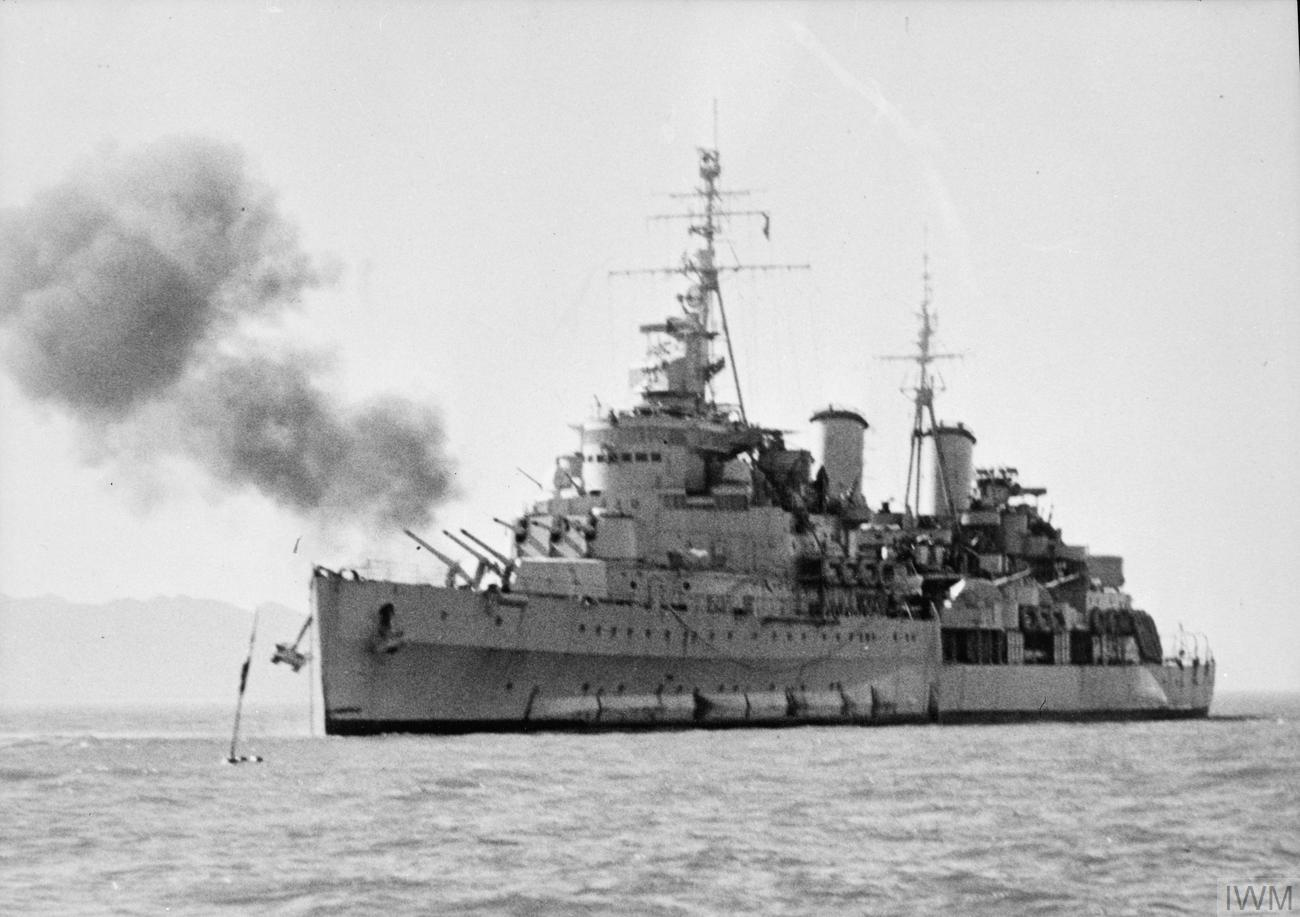
March 1951: At anchor, Belfast fires a salvo against enemy troop concentrations on the west coast of the Korean Peninsula.

With the outbreak of the Korean War, Belfast became part of the United Nations naval forces. Originally part of the U.S. Navy's Task Force 77, Belfast was detached to operate independently on 5 July 1950. During July and early August 1950, Belfast undertook coastal patrols and was based at Sasebo in Japan's Nagasaki Prefecture. From 19 July, Belfast supported troops fighting around Yongdok, accompanied by USS Juneau. That day, Belfast fired an accurate 350-round bombardment from her 6-inch guns and was praised by an American admiral as a "straight-shooting ship". (Note: The admiral is not identified in Wingate (2004), but may have been Rear Admiral John Higgins, for whom Juneau was flagship.) On 6 August, she sailed for the UK for a short (but needed) refit, after which she again set sail for the Far East and arrived back at Sasebo on 31 January 1951.

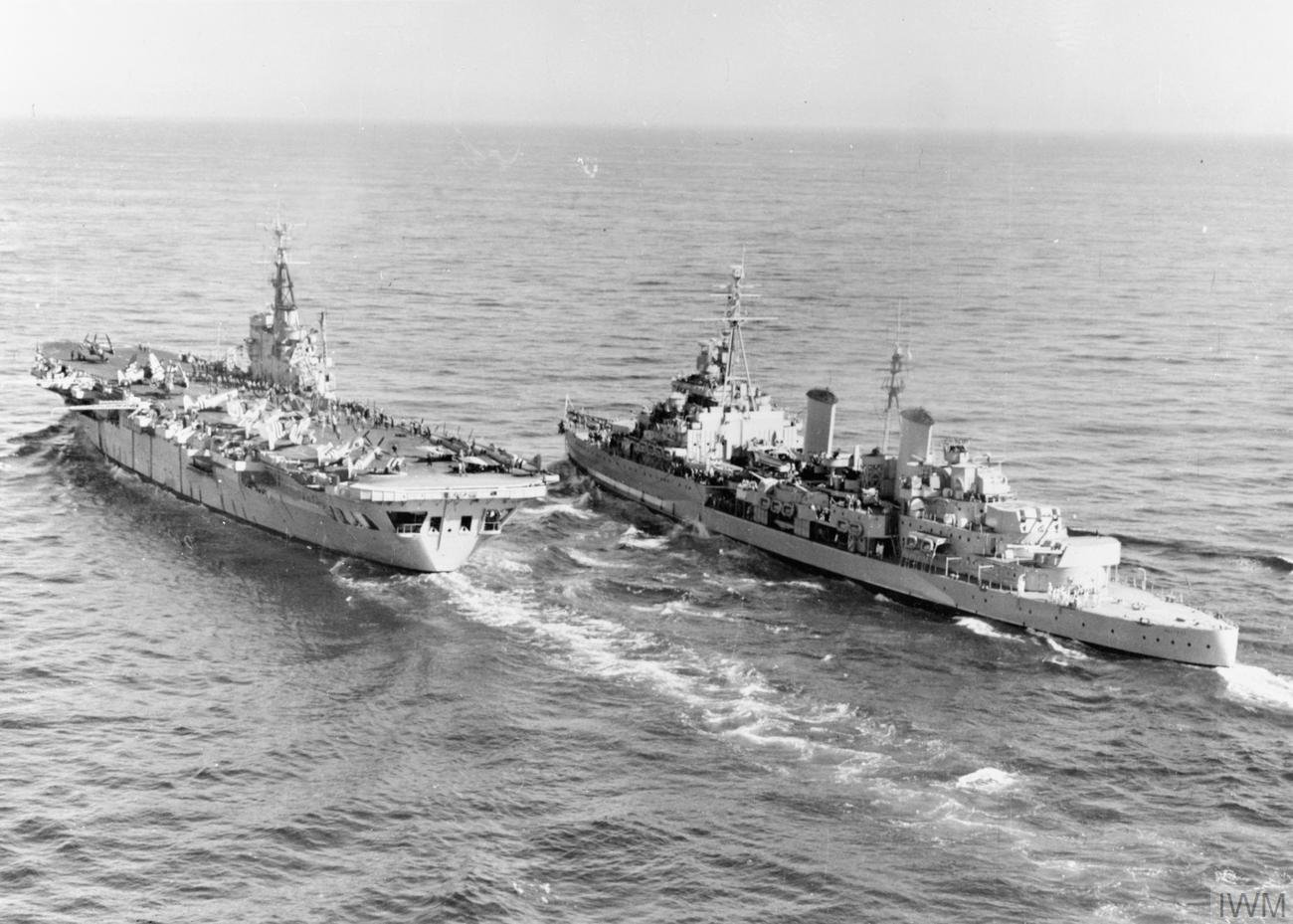
Belfast cruising alongside Ocean off Korea in 1952.

During 1951, Belfast mounted a number of coastal patrols and bombarded a variety of targets. On 1 June, she arrived at Singapore for refitting, arriving back on patrol on 31 August. In September 1951, Belfast provided AA cover for a salvage operation to recover a crashed enemy MiG-15 jet fighter. She conducted further bombardments and patrols before receiving a month's leave from operations, returning to action on 23 December.

In 1952, Belfast continued her coastal patrol duties. On 29 July 1952, she was hit by enemy fire while engaging an artillery battery on Wolsa-ri Island. A 75 mm shell struck a forward compartment, killing a British sailor of Chinese origin in his hammock and wounding four other Chinese ratings. This was the only time Belfast was hit by enemy fire during her Korean service. On 27 September 1952, Belfast was relieved by two other Town-class cruisers, HMS Birmingham and HMS Newcastle, and sailed back to the UK. She had steamed over 80,000 miles (130,000 km) in the combat zone and fired more than 8,000 rounds from her 6-inch guns during the Korean War. She paid off in Chatham on 4 November 1952 and entered reserve at Devonport on 1 December.

== Modernisation and final commissions 1955–1963 ==
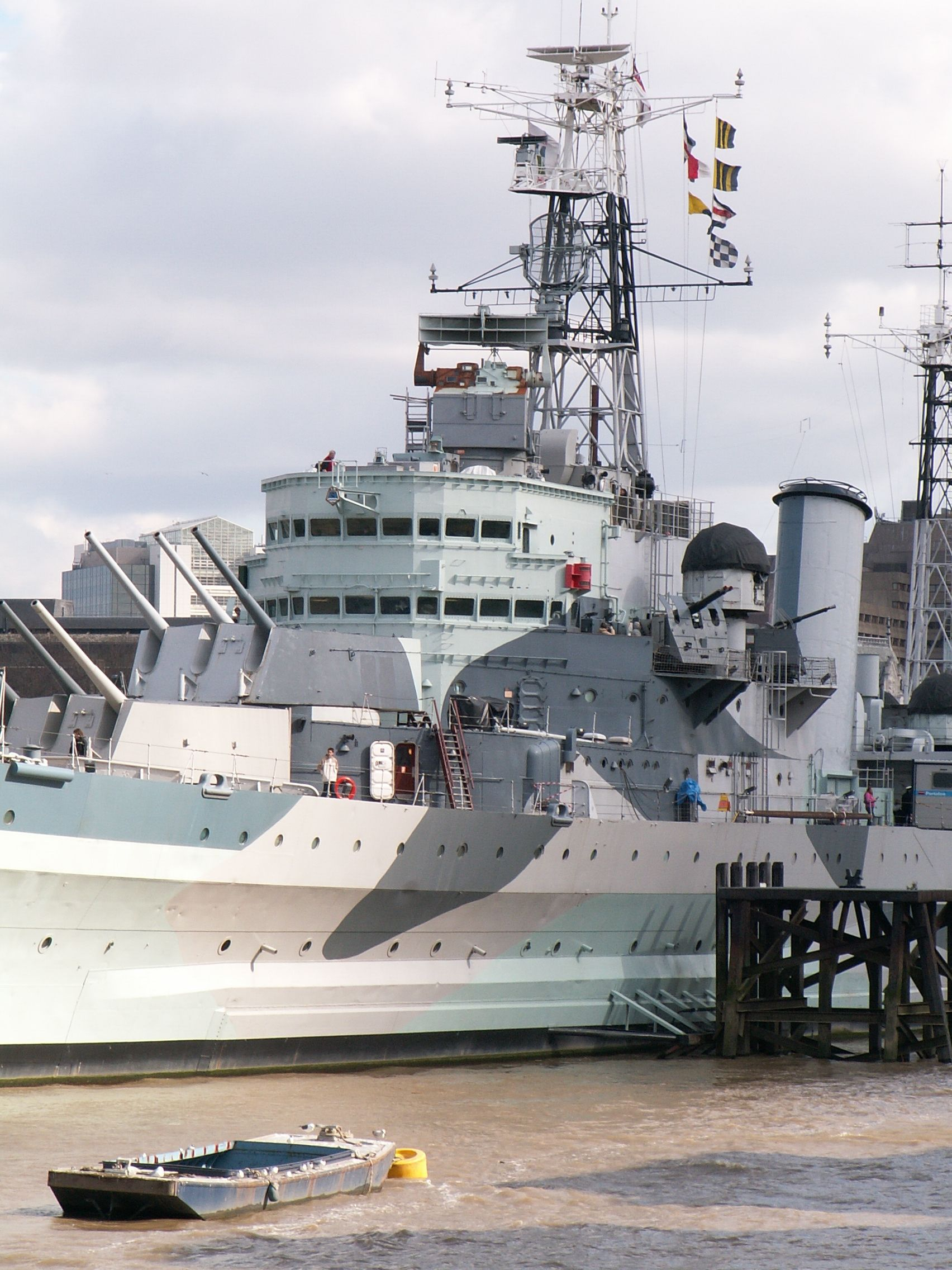
After modernisation; showing the enclosed bridge, lattice mast and twin 40 mm Bofors mountings.

In reserve, Belfast's future was uncertain; postwar defence cuts made manpower-intensive cruisers excessively costly to operate and the decision to modernise Belfast was not made until March 1955; work began on 6 January 1956. Although described as only an extended refit, the cost of £5.5 million was substantial for this large, middle-aged cruiser. Changes included individual MRS8 directors for the new twin Mk 5 40 mm and the twin 4-inch mounts; the 4-inch guns training and elevation speed was increased to 20 degrees per second; and protecting key parts of the ship against nuclear, biological, or chemical attack. This last consideration meant significantly enlarging and enclosing her bridge, creating a two-tiered, five-sided superstructure, which radically altered her appearance. Her boiler rooms were also given remote control, so they could still be run in the event of a nuclear, biological, or chemical attack, as the boiler rooms themselves were not protected. The most significant change was better accommodations for a smaller crew more fitting of postwar needs. Her tripod masts were replaced with lattice masts, and timber decking was replaced with steel everywhere except the quarterdeck. The overall effect was to create a cruiser significantly more habitable but different internally and to a degree in external appearance from wartime cruisers, but still essentially a surface warfare, 'anti-Sverdlov' cruiser, with AA defence updated for point defence only out to 4 km (2.5 mi).

Belfast recommissioned at Devonport on 12 May 1959. Her close-range armament was standardised to six twin 40 mm Bofors guns and her close-range fire direction similarly standardised to eight close-range blindfire directors fitted with Type 262 radar. Her 1959 radar fit included two Type 274 lock-and-follow radar directors for main armament direction against sea and land targets, (Note: Other 1950s cruiser reconstructions of three Town cruisers and HMS Newfoundland and HMS Ceylon had only a single main 274 director, which limited their surface effectiveness) Type 277Q and 293Q for height finding and surface warning, Type 960M for air warning, and 974 for surface warning. To save weight, her torpedo armament was removed. Modern passive sonars Type 174 and 176 were installed and noise-reducing rubber insulation was fitted to the propeller shaft.

Belfast arrived in Singapore on 16 December 1959 and spent most of 1960 at sea on exercise, calling at ports in Hong Kong, Borneo, India, Ceylon (now Sri Lanka), Australia, the Philippines, and Japan. On 31 January 1961, Belfast recommissioned under the command of Captain Morgan Morgan-Giles. On her final foreign commission, Belfast joined a number of exercises in the Far East, and in December 1961, she provided the British guard of honour at Tanganyika's independence ceremony in Dar-es-Salaam.

In 1961, plans were drawn up for the conversion of Belfast to a hybrid helicopter cruiser for amphibious operations. The two aft 6-inch turrets would be removed to accommodate a helicopter deck and two hangars capable of housing four Westland Wessex helicopters, while the 4-inch guns would be replaced by davits for four LCA landing craft. Only one of the ship's two boiler rooms would be used, which together with the reductions in armament, would allow the ship's crew to be reduced, thus freeing up space to carry troops. Two infantry companies, 30 officers, and 230 other ranks would be carried. The plan was rejected in December 1961 as the time required to carry out the conversions was too great.

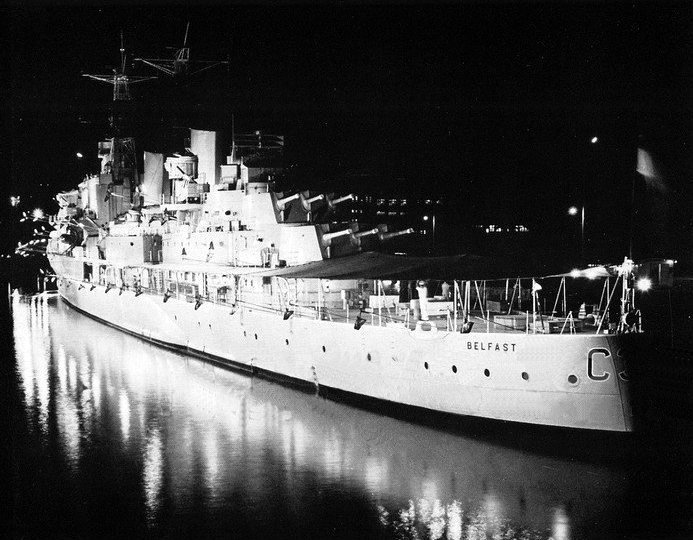
Belfast at Pearl Harbor, Hawaii, in 1962

The ship left Singapore on 26 March 1962 for the UK, sailing east via Hong Kong, Guam and Pearl Harbor, San Francisco, Seattle, British Columbia, Panama, and Trinidad. She arrived at Portsmouth on 19 June 1962.

Recommissioned in July, she made a final visit to Belfast from 23 to 29 November before paying off into reserve on 25 February 1963. In July 1963 Belfast was recommissioned for the last time, with a crew of the Royal Naval Reserve (RNR) and a number of Sea Cadets flying the flag of the Admiral Commanding Reserves, Rear Admiral Hugh Martell. Belfast sailed for Gibraltar in company with 16 RNR minesweepers for a two-week exercise in the Mediterranean on 10 August. Martell's obituarist considered this commission a well-judged contrivance, which "did much to restore the confidence and image of the new RNR" that had undergone an acrimonious amalgamation with the Royal Navy Volunteer Reserve in 1958.

== Reserve, decommissioning, and preservation efforts 1963–1971 ==
Belfast returned to Devonport on 24 August 1963 and underwent a short refit to prepare her for paying off into reserve, which occurred in December 1963. In January 1966, parts of the ship and power systems were reactivated, and from May 1966 to 1970, she served as an accommodation ship (taking over those duties from Sheffield), moored in Fareham Creek, for the Reserve Division at Portsmouth. While Belfast lay at Fareham Creek the Imperial War Museum, Britain's national museum of 20th-century conflict, became interested in preserving a 6-inch turret. The turret would represent a number of classes of cruiser (then disappearing from service) and would complement the museum's pair of British 15-inch naval guns.

On 14 April 1967, museum staff visited Gambia, a Crown Colony-class cruiser also moored in Fareham Creek at the time. Following the visit, the possibility was raised of preserving an entire ship. Gambia had already severely deteriorated, so attention turned to the possibility of saving Belfast. The Imperial War Museum, the National Maritime Museum, and the Ministry of Defence established a joint committee, which reported in June 1968 that the scheme was practical and economic. In early 1971, though, David Eccles, the Paymaster General, decided against preservation. On 4 May 1971 Belfast was "reduced to disposal" to await scrapping.

== HMS Belfast Trust 1971–1977 ==
HMS Belfast (Museum ship)
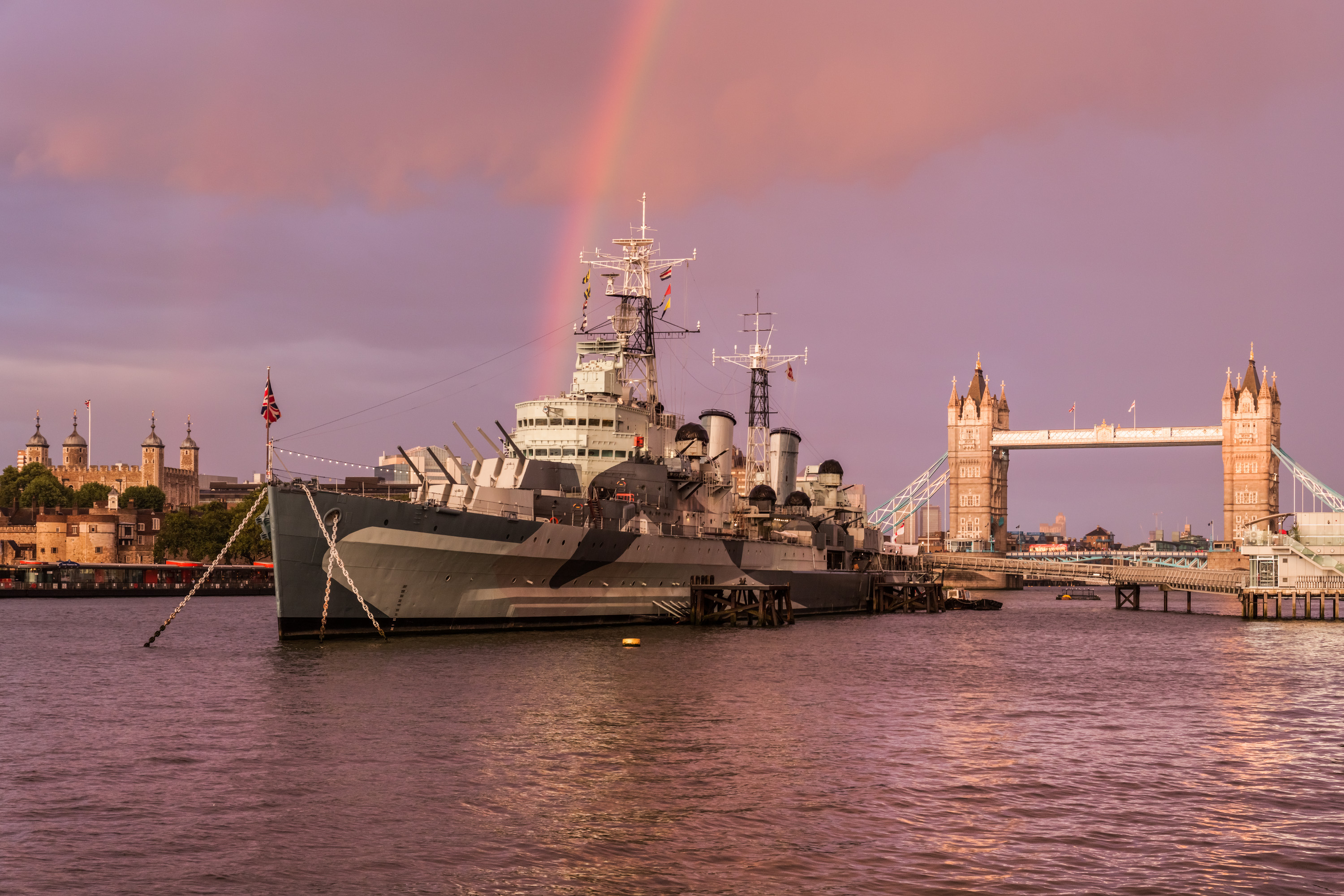
- HMS Belfast is berthed in the Pool of London; Tower Bridge can be seen behind.

- Location within Central London
- Established: 1971
- Location: The Queen's Walk, London, SE1 2JH
- Visitors: 204,656 (2025)
- Director: Phil Reed
- Public transit access: London Bridge station Tower Hill Underground station
- Website: www.iwm.org.uk/visits/hms-belfast

Imperial War Museums
- Churchill War Rooms; HMS Belfast; IWM Duxford; IWM London; IWM North

Following the government's refusal, a private trust was formed to campaign for the ship's preservation. The Belfast Trust was established; its chairman was Rear-Admiral Sir Morgan Morgan-Giles, captain of Belfast from January 1961 to July 1962. As Member of Parliament (MP) for Winchester, Morgan-Giles addressed the House of Commons on 8 March 1971. He described Belfast as being in "a really wonderful state of preservation" and that saving her for the nation represented a "case of grasping the last opportunity". Among the MPs who spoke in support of Morgan-Giles was Gordon Bagier, MP for Sunderland South, who served as a Royal Marine gunner aboard Belfast and was present at both the sinking of Scharnhorst and the Normandy landings. Speaking for the government, the under-secretary for the Navy, Peter Kirk, said that Belfast was "one of the most historic ships which the Navy has had in the last 20 years", but that he could not prevent the stripping of the ship's removable equipment, as this was already too far advanced to be halted. He did, however, agree to postpone any decision on the scrapping of Belfast to allow the Trust to put together a formal proposal.

Following the Trust's efforts, the government agreed to hand over Belfast to the Trustees in July 1971, with Vice-Admiral Sir Donald Gibson as her first director. At a press conference in August, the Trust announced "Operation Seahorse", (Note: Operation Seahorse was named for the ship's badge, which shows a seahorse (which also appears on the City of Belfast's coat of arms) wearing a red gorget over waves.) the plan to bring Belfast to London. She was towed from Portsmouth to London via Tilbury, where she was fitted out as a museum. She was towed to her berth above Tower Bridge on 15 October 1971 and settled in a huge hole that had been dredged in the riverbed; then she was attached to two dolphins, which guide her during the rise and fall of the tide.

She was opened to the public on Trafalgar Day, 21 October 1971. The date was significant, as Belfast was the first naval vessel to be saved for the nation since HMS Victory, Lord Nelson's flagship at the Battle of Trafalgar. Though no longer part of the Royal Navy, HMS Belfast was granted a special dispensation to allow her to continue to fly the White Ensign.

Now a museum, the ship's opening was well received; in 1972, the HMS Belfast Trust won the British Tourist Authority's "Come to Britain" trophy. Support for the ship's restoration was received from individuals, the Royal Navy, and commercial businesses; in 1973, for example, the Worshipful Company of Bakers provided dummy bread for display in the ship's NAAFI and bakery. By 1974, areas including the admiral's bridge and forward boiler and engine rooms had been restored and fitted out. That year also had the refurbishment of the ship's operations room by a team from HMS Vernon and the return of Belfast's six twin Bofors mounts, along with their fire directors. By December 1975, Belfast had received 1,500,000 visitors. In 1976, she was reaffiliated with the successors to the British Army's Royal Ulster Rifles, the Royal Irish Rangers, (Note: Amalgamated into the Royal Irish Regiment in 1992.) and in the same year the Royal Naval Amateur Radio Society restored the ship's bridge wireless office to working order. (Note: The Society operates the amateur radio callsign GB2RN from the ship's bridge wireless office.)

== Imperial War Museum 1978–present ==
By 1977, the financial position of the HMS Belfast Trust had become marginal, and the Imperial War Museum sought permission to merge the Trust into the museum. On 19 January 1978, the Secretary of State for Education and Science, Shirley Williams, accepted the proposal, stating that HMS Belfast "is a unique demonstration of an important phase of our history and technology". The ship was transferred to the museum on 1 March 1978, and became the Imperial War Museum's third branch, Duxford aerodrome having been acquired in 1976. In October 1998, the HMS Belfast Association was formed to reunite former members of the ship's company. The Imperial War Museum's Sound Archive also seeks to record oral history interviews with former crewmen.

=== Preservation ===
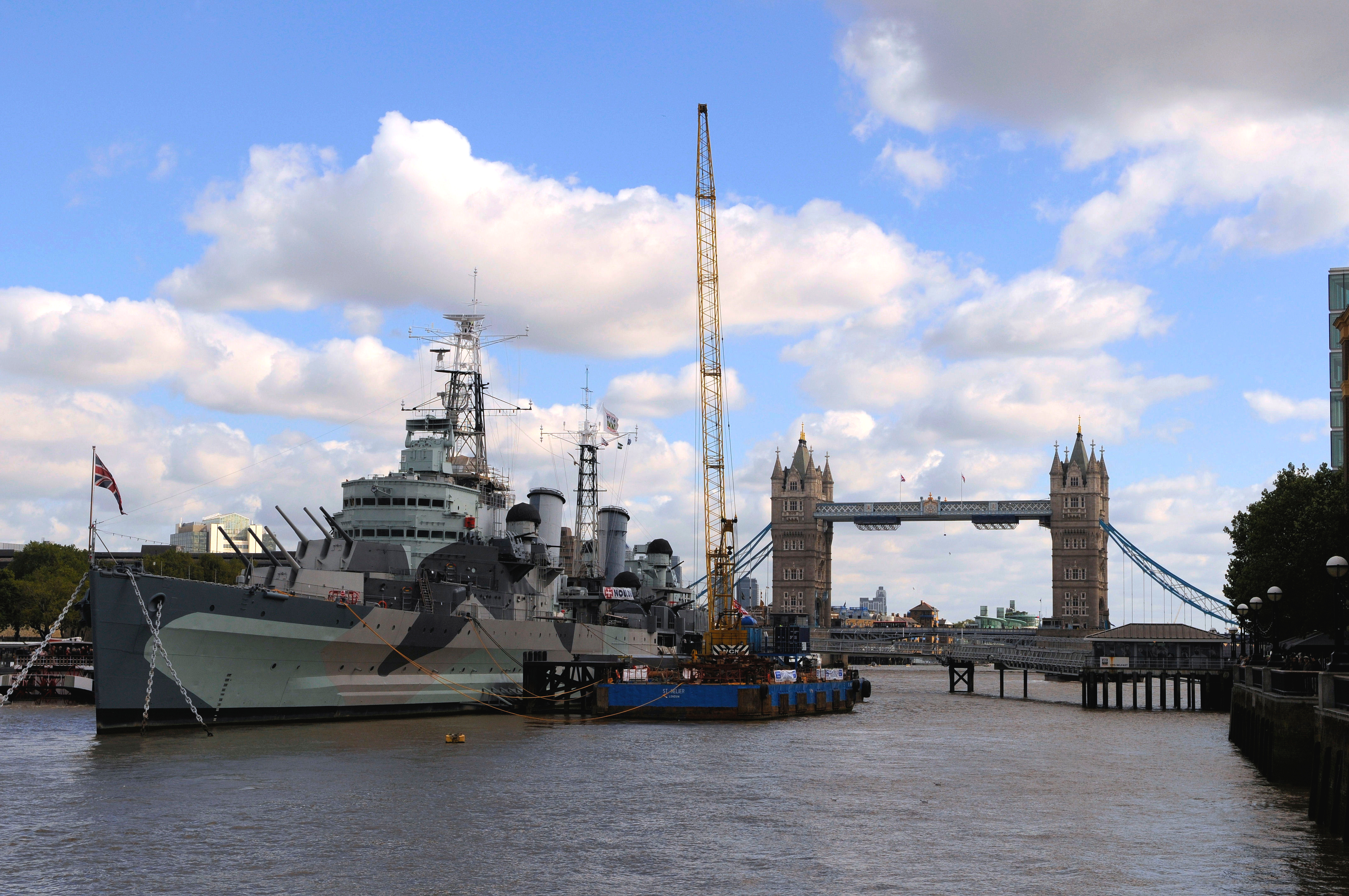
A floating crane was moored alongside HMS Belfast during the installation of her new masts, September 2010.

Since being brought to London, Belfast has twice been drydocked as part of the ship's long-term preservation. In 1982, she was docked at Tilbury and in June 1999 towed to Portsmouth. This was the first time she had been to sea in 28 years, so required a certificate of seaworthiness from the Maritime and Coastguard Agency. While in dock, her entire hull was cleaned, blasted, and repainted, her hull blanking plates inspected, and an ultrasonic survey carried out. She was not expected to require further drydocking until 2020. While under tow to Portsmouth, she was delayed by bad weather and arrived a day late; she had been intended to arrive on 6 June 1999, the 55th anniversary of the Normandy landings.

During the maintenance work, Belfast's hull and topsides were repainted in her specific camouflage scheme officially known as Admiralty Disruptive Camouflage Type 25, which she had worn from November 1942 to July 1944. This was objected to by some, due to the anachronistic conflict between her camouflage, which reflects the majority of her active Second World War service, and her present configuration, which was the result of the ship's extended refit from January 1956 to May 1959. With the establishment of the Department for Culture, Media and Sport's (DCMS) Advisory Committee on National Historic Ships in 2006, Belfast was listed as part of the National Historic Fleet. (Note: Belfast is one of three vessels with such listing in London, the other two being the tea clipper Cutty Sark and the coastal steamer SS Robin.)

On 9 May 2010, a ceremony was held aboard Belfast to mark the 65th anniversary of end of the Second World War in Europe. Veterans of the Arctic convoys were in attendance to receive medals from the Russian Ambassador Yuri Fedotov. During the ceremony, it was announced that as part of the restoration of the ship, two new masts had been manufactured at the Severnaya Verf shipyard near Saint Petersburg. The production of the masts, to replace corroded originals, had been supported by a number of Russian businesses at a reported cost of £500,000. (Note: The Russian companies included United Industrial Corporation, SeverStal and Sovcomflot. Assistance was also received from Lloyd's Register.) The restoration of the masts involved removing the fittings from both masts, allowing them to be individually restored. The old masts were then cut down in sections, the new masts erected, and the original fittings replaced. On 19 October 2010, the new masts were dedicated at a ceremony attended by HMS Belfast veterans, Prince Philip, and officials from the Russian embassy and government.

In 2017, the Royal Navy announced that the third of its Type 26 frigates would be named Belfast. At the same time, the IWM stated that the museum would be renamed as "HMS Belfast (1938)" as a means of avoiding confusion.

=== Interpretation ===
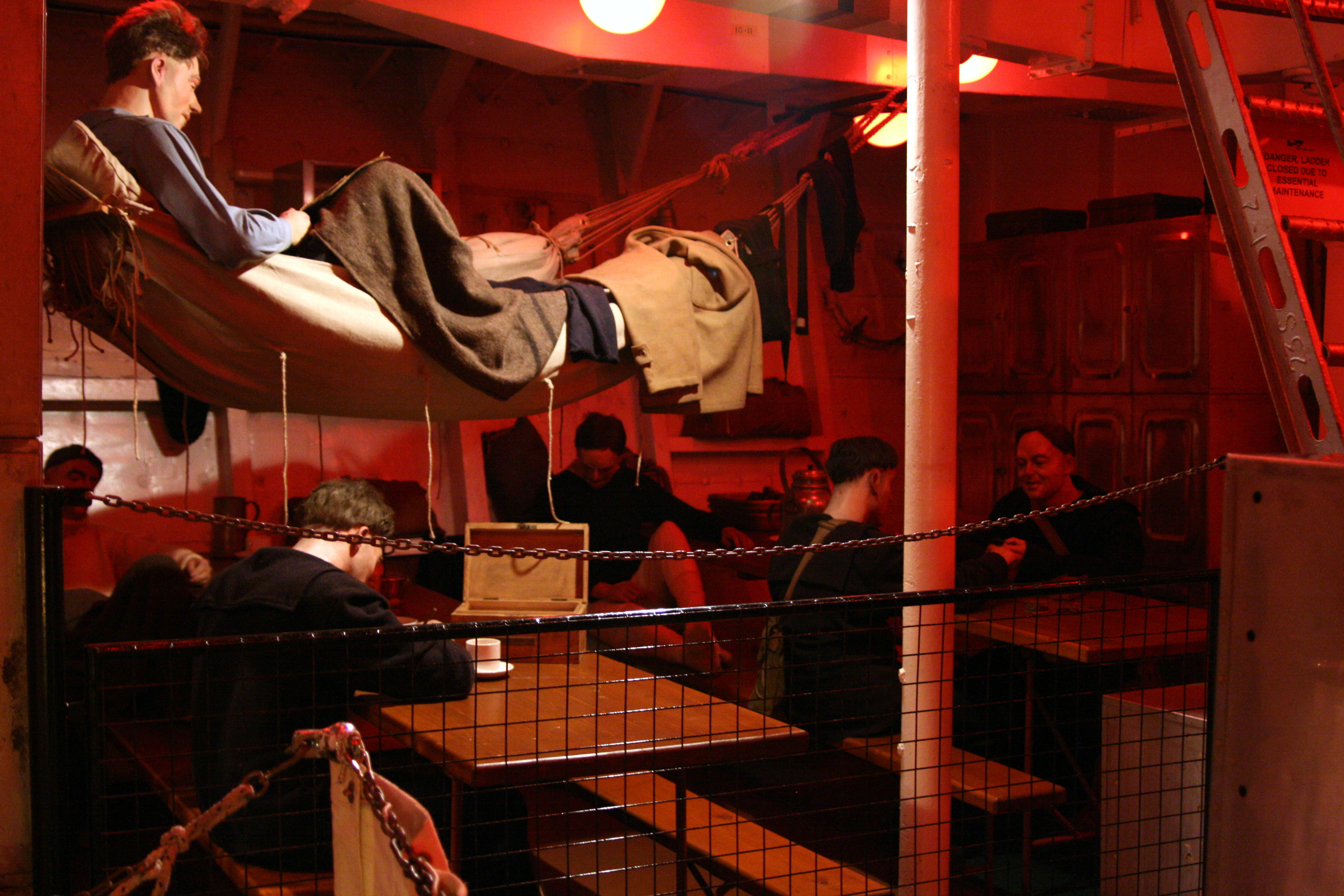
Arctic messdeck in a forward compartment.

Museum-ship HMS Belfast, seen from a tourist boat.

When Belfast was first opened to the public, visitors were limited to the upper decks and forward superstructure. As of 2011, nine decks are open to the public. Access to the ship is via a walkway that connects the quarterdeck with the footpath on the south bank of the River Thames. The Imperial War Museum's guidebook to HMS Belfast divides the ship into three broad sections. The first of these, "Life on board the ship", focuses on the experience of serving at sea. Restored compartments, some populated with dressed figures, illustrate the crew's living conditions and the ship's various facilities, such as the sick bay, galley, laundry, chapel, mess decks, and NAAFI. Since 2002, school and youth groups have been able to stay onboard Belfast overnight, sleeping in bunks on a restored 1950s mess deck.

The second section, "The inner workings", below the waterline and protected by the ship's armoured belt, contains core mechanical, electrical, and communication systems. As well as the engine and boiler rooms, other compartments include the transmitting station (housing the ship's Admiralty fire-control table, a mechanical computer), the forward steering position, and one of Belfast's 6-inch shell rooms and magazines. The third section, "Action stations", includes the upper deck and forward superstructure with the ship's armament, fire control, and command facilities. Areas open to the public include the operations room, admiral's bridge, and gun direction platform. During 2011, two of these areas were reinterpreted. The operations room was restored to its appearance during Exercise Pony Express, a large British-Australian-American joint exercise held off North Borneo in 1961. The reinterpretation included an interactive audiovisual plotting table. (Note: The reinterpretation was supported by £150,000 from DCMS and the Wolfson Foundation.)

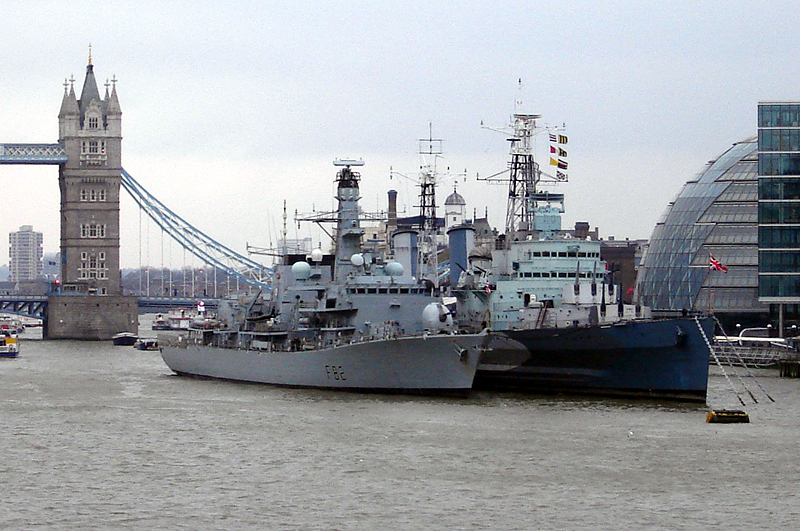
HMS Somerset alongside Belfast

In July 2011, the interior of Y Turret, the aftmost 6-inch turret, was redisplayed using audiovisual and atmospheric effects, seeking to evoke the experience of a gunner at the Battle of North Cape. To emphasise the range of the ship's armament, the forward 6-inch guns of A and B Turrets are trained on the London Gateway service area on the M1 motorway, about 12 miles (19 km) away on the outskirts of London. A 4-inch gun mount and a shell hoist are kept in working order and used during blank-firing demonstrations by the Wavy Navy re-enactment group. In addition to the various areas of the ship open to visitors, some compartments have been fitted out as dedicated exhibition space. Permanent exhibitions include "HMS Belfast in War and Peace" and "Life at Sea". The cost of admission to HMS Belfast includes a multilingual audio guide.

HMS Belfast also serves as the headquarters of the City of London Sea Cadet Corps, and her prestigious location in central London as a result means she frequently has other vessels berthed alongside. In October 2007, Belfast hosted the naming ceremony of the lighthouse tender THV Galatea with the Queen and Prince Philip in attendance.

=== 2011 accident ===
On 29 November 2011, two workmen suffered minor injuries after a section of gangway, connected to the ship, collapsed during renovation works. The ship was closed to visitors following the accident. An investigation later established that the collapse of the gangway had been caused by a subcontractor cutting through the gangway's structure during refurbishment work. Belfast re-opened on 18 May 2012.

The closure delayed the construction of a new, two-storey, bank-side pavilion to replace Belfast's existing retail and admissions building. The structure, for which planning permission was received in October 2011, provides a ground-floor café, shop, and admissions area and a rooftop bar. Initially expected to be completed by summer 2012, the pavilion opened in April 2013.

== Bibliography ==
- Diprose, Graham; Craig, Charles & Seaborne, Mike (2009). London's Changing Riverscape. Francis Lincoln. ISBN 978-0-7112-2941-9.
- Imperial War Museum (2009). HMS Belfast. London: Imperial War Museum. ISBN 978-1-904897-93-4.
- Lavery, Brian (2015). The Last Big Gun: At War and at Sea with HMS Belfast. London: The Pool of London Press. ISBN 978-1-910860-01-4.
- McCart, Neil (2012). Town Class Cruisers. Liskeard, UK: Maritime Books. ISBN 978-1-904-45952-1.
- Rohwer, Jürgen (2005). Chronology of the War at Sea 1939–1945: The Naval History of World War Two (Third Revised ed.). Annapolis, Maryland: Naval Institute Press. ISBN 1-59114-119-2.
- Waters, Conrad (2019). "Warship Notes: The Helicopter Cruiser HMS Belfast". In Jordan, John (ed.). Warship 2019. Oxford: Osprey Publishing. ISBN 978-1-4728-3595-6.
- Waters, Conrad (2019b). British Town Class Cruisers: Design, Development & Performance; Southampton & Belfast Classes. Barnsley, UK: Seaforth Publishing. ISBN 978-1-5267-1885-3.
- Watton, Ross (1985). The Cruiser Belfast. Anatomy of the Ship. London: Conway Maritime Press. ISBN 0-85177-328-1.
- Wingate, John (2004). In Trust for the Nation: HMS Belfast 1939–1972. London: Imperial War Museum. ISBN 1-901623-72-6.
