= Paragon (automobile) =

Defunct American motor vehicle manufacturer

Detroit Automobile Manufacturing Company
- Founded: 1905; 121 years ago
- Defunct: 1907; 119 years ago
- Fate: Sold
- Successor: Marvel Motor Car Company
- Headquarters: Detroit, Michigan, United States
- Key people: J. P. La Vigne

The Paragon and La Petite were automobiles produced by the Detroit Automobile Manufacturing Company in Detroit, Michigan from 1905 to 1907.

== History ==
J. P. La Vigne built his first automobile in 1898, and with his daughter Olive continued with experimental cars and other inventions until 1905 when the Detroit Automobile Manufacturing Company was set-up. The factory at 284–290 Rivard Street in Detroit first produced the La Petite which was displayed at the Detroit Automobile Show. J. P. La Vigne was unhappy with his engine manufacturer and left the company.

Detroit Automobile Manufacturing change the name of the car to Paragon and produced it through 1906. The La Petite and Paragon were a small two-seat runabout weighing only 650 pounds. They were equipped with a 0.7 liter, single-cylinder 5-hp engine and sold for $375, equivalent to $13,437 in 2025. The only difference between the two was La Petite had a 65-inch wheelbase and the Paragon was 68-inches.

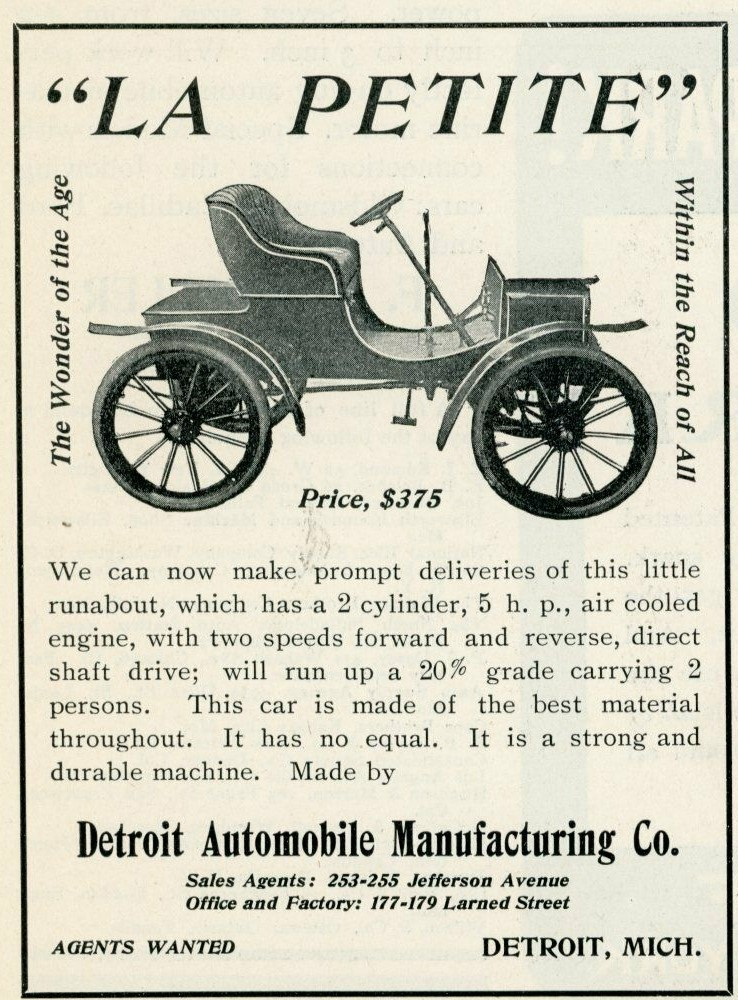
1905 La Petite automobile from Cycle and Automobile Trade Journal

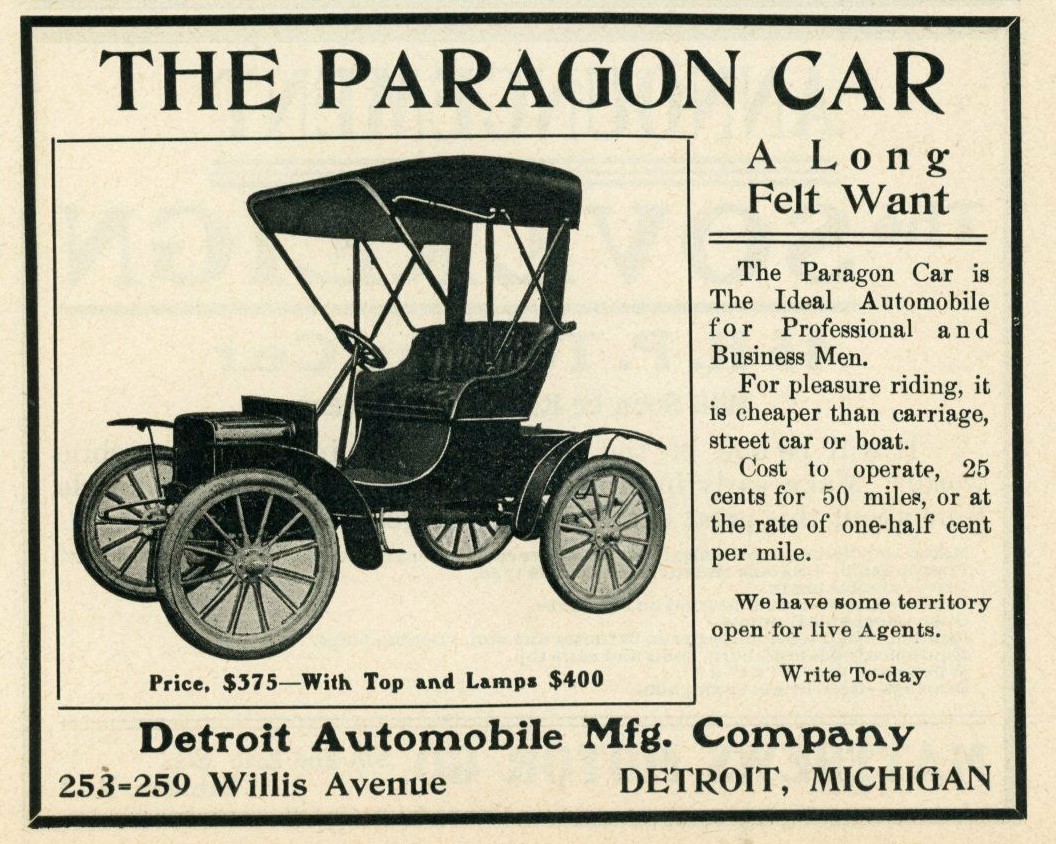
1906 Paragon Car advertisement from Cycle and Automobile Trade Journal

== See also ==
- 1905 Paragon at the AACA Museum in Hershey, PA
