= The Marvels (disambiguation) =

The Marvels is a 2023 superhero film and the sequel to Captain Marvel.

The Marvels may also refer to:

- The Marvels (band), a reggae group active from 1962–1982
- The Marvels, a book by Brian Selznick, 2015
- The Marvels, an issue of the 2017 comic book Generations

== See also ==
- Marvel (disambiguation)
- Marvels (disambiguation)
