= Royal Naval Amateur Radio Society =

The Royal Naval Amateur Radio Society (RNARS) is a specialised group or club for amateur radio operators who have a link with maritime employment, such as members of a navy, merchant marine or similar employment. As such, RNARS has become a de facto international group for such people.

RNARS is well known for fostering amateur radio stations in museum ships. The best known in the UK is HMS Belfast.

RNARS is open to membership by people from "allied" nations. For instance, there are members in countries such as the United States and the Netherlands, and a semi-autonomous national group in Australia that has stations in three museum ships: HMAS Vampire, HMAS Diamantina, and HMAS Castlemaine.

RNARS offers several certificates for amateurs and shortwave listeners (SWLs) who make contacts or copy transmissions by RNARS members. There is also a Morse code speed certificate.
