= Weigh anchor =

Nautical term for getting underway

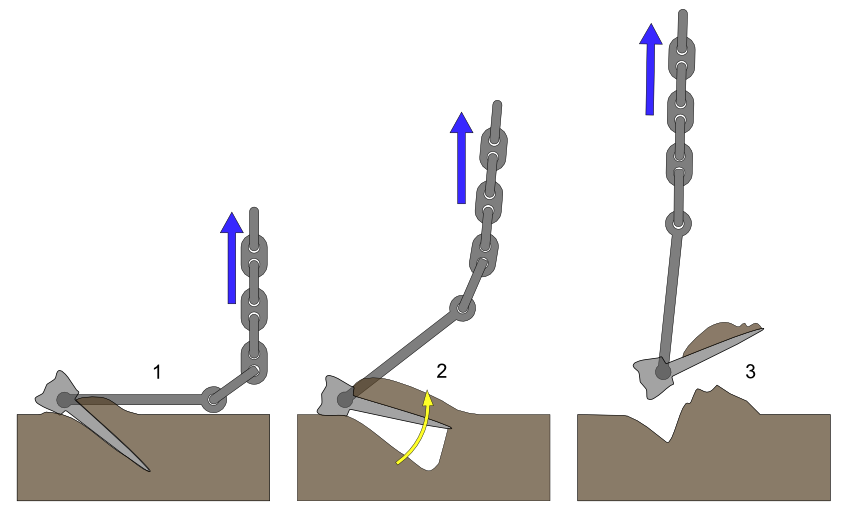
A poleless anchor on the process of breakout

Weigh anchor is a nautical term indicating the final preparation of a sea vessel for getting underway.

Weighing anchor means raising the anchor of the vessel from the sea floor and hoisting it up to be stowed on board the vessel. At the moment when the anchor is no longer touching the sea floor, it is aweigh.

== Example of use ==
USS Marvel's narrative is described in part in DANFS as "On 17 January 1945 she weighed anchor and began a 2 1/2-month cruise to Kodiak, Alaska."

== When not at anchor ==
When a vessel is not at anchor, but tied to a pier or to another anchored vessel, it does not weigh anchor; the captain or master gives the order to "take in lines."
