= Marvel (automobile) =

Defunct American motor vehicle manufacturer

Marvel Motor Car Company
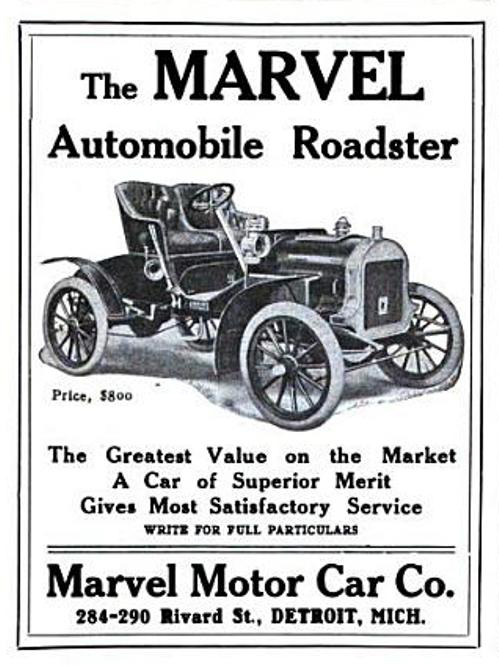
- 1907 Marvel 14 HP Roadster

Overview
- Manufacturer: Marvel Motor Car Company
- Production: 1907

Body and chassis
- Body style: runabout

Powertrain
- Engine: horizontal two-cylinder gasoline
- Transmission: planetary

Chronology
- Successor: Crescent Runabout

The Marvel was an automobile built at 284–290 Rivard Street, Detroit, Michigan, United States, by the Marvel Motor Car Company in 1907.

Marvel Motor Car Company purchased the Paragon factory and began building their own runabout. The Marvel was a two-seat runabout with a horizontal two-cylinder 14-hp engine, a planetary transmission and single chain drive. Price was set at $800, (equivalent to $27,643 in 2025).

The company lost its factory space and ended production. The car became the Crescent in 1908.
