= Captain Marvel =

Captain Marvel may refer to:

== Comics ==
- Shazam (DC Comics), several DC characters:
  - Billy Batson, the original Captain Marvel, currently called Shazam
  - Mary Marvel, called Captain Marvel in The Power of Shazam!
  - Captain Marvel Jr., called Captain Marvel in "Titans Tomorrow"
- Captain Marvel (Marvel Comics), several Marvel Comics characters:
  - Mar-Vell, the original (Marvel Comics) Captain Marvel
    - Mar-Vell (Marvel Cinematic Universe), the Marvel Cinematic Universe adaptation
  - Monica Rambeau, also known as Photon, Pulsar, and Spectrum
    - Monica Rambeau (Marvel Cinematic Universe), the Marvel Cinematic Universe adaptation
  - Genis-Vell, also known as Legacy and Photon
  - Phyla-Vell, also known as Quasar and Martyr
  - Khn'nr, a Skrull posing as Mar-Vell
  - Mahr Vehl, the Ultimate Universe version of Captain Marvel
  - Noh-Varr, also known as Marvel Boy and Protector
  - Carol Danvers, the current Captain Marvel, formerly known as Ms. Marvel
    - Carol Danvers (Marvel Cinematic Universe), the Marvel Cinematic Universe adaptation
      - Maria Rambeau, who becomes Captain Marvel in an alternate timeline
- Captain Marvel (Amalgam Comics), an amalgam of Marvel's Mar-Vell and DC's Billy Batson
- Captain Marvel (M. F. Enterprises)

== Film and television ==
- Adventures of Captain Marvel, a 1941 film serial about the Fawcett Comics character
- Captain Marvel (film), a 2019 film about the Marvel Comics character
- "Captain Marvel", a 2016 episode of Avengers Assemble
- "Captain Marvel" (MPower), an episode of MPower

== Music ==
- "Captain Marvel", a 1972 Chick Corea composition recorded on Light as a Feather, the 1973 Return to Forever album
- Captain Marvel (album), a 1974 album by Stan Getz, with the Corea composition as title track
- Captain Marvel (soundtrack), a soundtrack album from the 2019 film, by Pinar Toprak

== Other uses ==
- "Captain Marvel", nickname of Bryan Robson (born 1957), English football player and manager
- Captain Marvelous (Gokaiger), the main protagonist of the 2011 Super Sentai series Kaizoku Sentai Gokaiger
- Captain Marvelous, a comic book character from the 1979 Australian television soap opera Prisoner

== See also ==
- Captain (disambiguation)
- Marvel (disambiguation)
