= USS Marvel =

Minesweeper of the United States Navy

History

United States
- Name: USS Marvel (AM-262)
- Builder: American Shipbuilding Company, Lorain, Ohio
- Laid down: 12 April 1943
- Launched: 31 July 1943
- Sponsored by: Miss Naomi Gordan
- Commissioned: 9 June 1944
- Decommissioned: 21 May 1945
- Fate: Transferred to Soviet Navy, 21 May 1945
- Reclassified: MSF-262, 7 February 1955
- Stricken: 1 January 1983

History

Soviet Union
- Name: T-274
- Acquired: 21 May 1945
- Commissioned: 21 May 1945
- Refit: Converted to naval trawler, 1948
- Renamed: Passat, 1948
- Fate: Scrapped 1960

General characteristics
- Class & type: Admirable-class minesweeper
- Displacement: 650 long tons (660 t)
- Length: 184 ft 6 in (56.24 m)
- Beam: 33 ft (10 m)
- Draft: 9 ft 9 in (2.97 m)
- Propulsion: 2 × ALCO 539 diesel engines, 1,710 shp (1.3 MW); Farrel-Birmingham single reduction gear; 2 shafts
- Speed: 14.8 knots (27.4 km/h)
- Complement: 104
- Armament: 1 × 3"/50 caliber gun DP; 2 × twin Bofors 40 mm guns; 1 × Hedgehog anti-submarine mortar; 2 × depth charge tracks

Service record
- Part of: United States Atlantic Fleet (1944-1945; United States Pacific Fleet (1945); Soviet Pacific Ocean Fleet (1945-1960)

USS Marvel (AM-262) was an Admirable-class minesweeper built for the United States Navy during World War II and in commission from 1944 to 1945. In 1945, she was transferred to the Soviet Union and then served in the Soviet Navy as T-272. The Soviets converted her into a naval trawler in 1948 and renamed her Passat.

== Construction and commissioning ==
Marvel was laid down on 4 April 1943 at Lorain, Ohio, by the American Shipbuilding Company, launched on 31 July 1943, sponsored by Miss Naomi Gordan, and commissioned on 9 June 1944.

== Service history ==
=== U.S. Navy, World War II, 1944-1945 ===
Completing a brief shakedown at Little Creek, Virginia, Marvel got underway on 19 August 1944 for Naval Operating Base Bermuda. Into the mid-autumn of 1944, she operated from St. George's Bay, Bermuda, sweeping for mines and conducting antisubmarine patrols to ensure safe passage into the eastern terminus of the southern transatlantic convoy route. She returned to Virginia on 9 November 1944, and for the next two months conducted similar patrols in the Hampton Roads area.

On 17 January 1945, Marvel weighed anchor and began a two-and-a-half month cruise to Kodiak, Territory of Alaska. Steaming via Coco Solo in the Panama Canal Zone, San Diego, California, and Seattle, Washington, she arrived at Kodiak on 31 March 1945. On 2 April 1945 she departed for the Shumagin Islands, arriving at Baralof Bay on 3 April 1945. There she conducted local exercises.

Selected for transfer to the Soviet Navy in Project Hula – a secret program for the transfer of U.S. Navy ships to the Soviet Navy at Cold Bay, Alaska, in anticipation of the Soviet Union joining the war against Japan – Marvel proceeded to Cold Bay in the spring of 1945 to begin familiarization training of her new Soviet crew.

=== Soviet Navy, 1945-1960 ===
Following the completion of training for her Soviet crew, Marvel was decommissioned on 21 May 1945 at Cold Bay and transferred to the Soviet Union under Lend-Lease immediately. Also commissioned into the Soviet Navy immediately, she was designated as a tralshik ("minesweeper") and renamed T-274 in Soviet service. She soon departed Cold Bay bound for Petropavlovsk-Kamchatsky in the Soviet Union, where she served in the Soviet Far East.

In February 1946, the United States began negotiations for the return of ships loaned to the Soviet Union for use during World War II, and on 8 May 1947, United States Secretary of the Navy James V. Forrestal informed the United States Department of State that the United States Department of the Navy wanted 480 of the 585 combatant ships it had transferred to the Soviet Union for World War II use returned. Deteriorating relations between the two countries as the Cold War broke out led to protracted negotiations over the ships, and by the mid-1950s the U.S. Navy found it too expensive to bring home ships that had become worthless to it anyway. Many ex-American ships were merely administratively "returned" to the United States and instead sold for scrap in the Soviet Union, while the U.S. Navy did not seriously pursue the return of others because it viewed them as no longer worth the cost of recovery. The Soviets converted T-272 into a naval trawler in 1948 and renamed her Passat, and never returned 'her to the United States, although the U.S. Navy reclassified her as a "fleet minesweeper" (MSF) and redesignated her MSF-262 on 7 February 1955.

== Disposal ==
T-274 was scrapped in 1960. Unaware of her fate, the U.S. Navy kept Marvel on its Naval Vessel Register until finally striking her on 1 January 1983.
