= Marville =

Marville may refer to:

- Marville (comics), a Marvel Comics series from the early 2000s
- Marville, Meuse, a commune of the Meuse département, in France

== People ==
- Charles Marville (1813–1879), French photographer
- Marie Marville (1873–1961), French actress
