= William Marvell =

William Marvell was an English executioner in the eighteenth century.

Marvell, a blacksmith by trade, conducted hangings at Tyburn starting in 1715. He lost his job due to debt in November 1717, and two years later he was convicted of theft after stealing "10 silk handkerchiefs."

== See also ==
- List of executioners
