= Marvel Williamson =

Former dean of the Kramer School of Nursing, Oklahoma City University

Marvel Williamson (born November 4, 1953, in Holton, Kansas) is previously the Dean of the Kramer School of Nursing at Oklahoma City University.

== Academia ==
She came to Oklahoma from the American Nurses Association in Washington, D.C., where she was a Grants Specialist and director of strategic planning for the American Nurses Foundation. She has also served as Dean of Health Sciences and Director of the Ellen Finley Earhart School of Nursing at Park University; Vice President for Patient Services at Ransom Memorial Hospital (in Kansas); professor of nursing at the University of Iowa, the University of Kentucky, and Albany State University.

She earned her Ph.D. in Educational Administration from the University of Iowa. Her MSN was earned at the University of Kentucky and her BSN from Wichita State University.

== Writings ==
Williamson is the author of numerous professional journal articles, book chapters, and the book Great Sex After 40: Strategies for Lifelong Fulfillment. She served as principal investigator on 12 scientific research studies, and wrote numerous grant-funded initiatives, totaling over $6,300,000 in federal and private grants approved thus far. She is a manuscript reviewer for Clinical Nursing Research, Western Journal of Nursing Research, Nursing and the American Journal of Nursing.

Williamson has served on the National Coordinating Committee for School Health for the US Department of Health and Human Services, US Department of Agriculture, and the US Department of Education and on the National School Food Safety Coalition for the Centers for Disease Control and Prevention; and the Sex Education Advisory Panel for the Alan Guttmacher Institute (New York).

== Personal life ==
She has been married to Paul Williamson since 1973; they have two sons, Marcus and Sean.
