= Explorer (disambiguation) =

An explorer is a person involved in exploration, an activity with some expectation of discovery.

Explorer, Explore or Exploring may also refer to:

== Arts, entertainment and media ==
=== Film and television ===
- Explorers (film), a 1985 science fiction film
- Explorer (film), 2022 documentary film about explorer Sir Ranulph Fiennes
- "Explorers" (Star Trek: Deep Space Nine), a TV episode
- Explore (TV series), 1980s American TV show
- Exploring (TV series), 1960s American children's TV show
- National Geographic Explorer, a documentary TV series

=== Literature ===
- Explorer (novel), 2002, in C. J. Cherryh's Foreigner series
- explore (magazine), a Canadian travel magazine
- The Northwest Explorer, a newspaper in Tucson, Arizona, U.S.
- Explore: The Journal of Science & Healing, an American journal

=== Music ===
- Explore!, a 2015 album by Isyana Sarasvati
- Explorer (album), by Tilt, 2005, and the title track
- "Explorers", a song by Muse from the 2012 album The 2nd Law

=== Other ===
- Explorer (video game), a 1986 video game for the ZX Spectrum
- Explorer (1982 video game), a 1982 arcade game by Data East

== Businesses and organizations ==
- ExploreLearning, an American online mathematics and science simulation provider
- Explore Scientific, a manufacturer of telescopes, microscopes & binoculars
- Explore Technologies, a toy manufacturer
- Explorer Vodka, Swedish brand of vodka

== Places ==
- Explorer Peak, a mountain in Utah, U.S.
- Explorer Ridge, a mid-ocean ridge on the coast of British Columbia, Canada
- Explorer Seamount, in the Pacific Ocean

== Science and technology ==
- Microsoft Explorer (disambiguation)
- Texas Instruments Explorer, a computer family of Lisp machines

== Transportation ==
=== Aircraft and spacecraft ===
- Abrams P-1 Explorer, American aerial survey aircraft from 1937
- ecoDemonstrator Explorer, a Boeing program
- Explorer 1, the US' first artificial satellite
- Lockheed Explorer, a wooden aircraft
- MD Helicopters MD Explorer, a helicopter
- P&M Explorer, a British ultralight trike
- Space Adventures Explorer, a Russian concept tourist spaceplane
- Space Shuttle Independence, formerly known as Explorer, a full-scale replica of the Space Shuttle
- Explorer, an Armstrong Whitworth Ensign aircraft

=== Maritime ===
- Explorer (sternwheeler), an 1857 steamboat
- HMS Explorer, the name of two ships of the Royal Navy
- Stena Explorer, a high-speed ferry renamed HSC One World Karadeniz
- MS National Geographic Explorer, a cruise ship
- MV Explorer, the name of several ships
- SS Explorer, a 1955 steam trawler
- Sub Marine Explorer, an 1865 early submarine
- USC&GS Explorer, the name of two ships of the US Coast and Geodetic Survey
- Glomar Explorer, a deep-sea recovery or drilling ship
- Explorer, a barque that crossed the Atlantic to North America in 1603 under Martin Pring

=== Vehicles ===
- Ford Explorer, a sport utility vehicle

== Other uses ==
- Gibson Explorer, a model of guitar
- Explore (education), Canadian educational exchange programs
- Explorer Scouts (The Scout Association), a British youth organisation
- Exploring (Learning for Life), affiliated with Boy Scouts of America

== See also ==
- Xplorer (disambiguation)
- The Explorer (disambiguation)
- Explorer One (disambiguation)
- Exploration (disambiguation)
- Expedition (disambiguation)
- List of explorers
