= Convoy QP 8 =

Artic convoy of the Second World War

- Part of Arctic Convoys of the Second World War
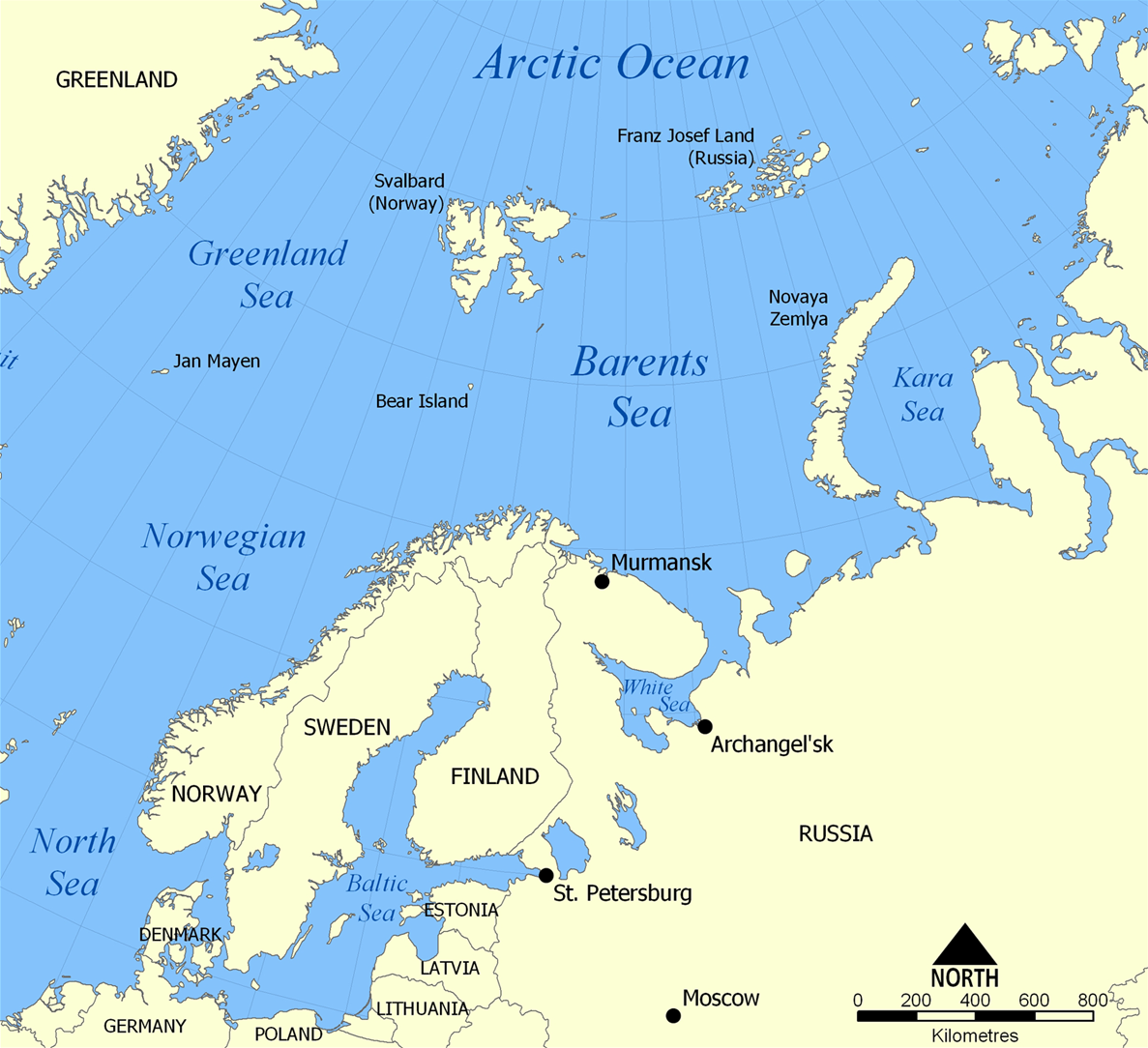
- The Norwegian and the Barents seas, site of the Arctic convoys
Date	1–11 March 1942
Location	Arctic Ocean

Belligerents
Royal Navy; Merchant Navy; Panama; Soviet Union	Luftwaffe; Kriegsmarine

Commanders and leaders
Naval: John Seymour; Merchant: Captain, Empire Selwyn	Hans-Jürgen Stumpff; Hermann Böhm

Strength
Merchant ships: 15; Escorts: 13 (in relays); submarines: 11	1 Battleship; 4 destroyers; 4 U-boats

Casualties and losses
Merchant ship Izhora sunk	Nil

Convoy QP 8 (1–11 March 1942) departed Murmansk with eight merchant ships. The perpetual darkness of the Arctic winter had begun to wane but for two or three more months, the Polar ice would not begin to melt and allow convoys to sail further from the Norwegian coast. Despite the misgivings of the Admiralty the importance to British grand strategy of keeping the Soviet Union in the war remained paramount.

The British knew of the reinforcement of the Kriegsmarine and Luftflotte V (Air Fleet 5) and the homeward Convoy QP 8 sailed at the same time as the next outbound convoy, Convoy PQ 12, with the support of the Home Fleet, more convoy escorts, more reconnaissance flights by RAF Coastal Command and coast watching by British and Soviet submarines waiting in ambush for the big German ships.

Tirpitz and four destroyers had arrived at Trondheim on 16 January 1942 and sailed against the convoy and Convoy PQ 12. The convoy reached Iceland safely, except for the Soviet freighter SS Ijora, that had straggled amidst the storms that dispersed the convoy and was sunk by the German destroyer Z14 Friedrich Ihn. Tirpitz had a narrow escape when attacked by Fleet Air Arm torpedo-bombers and the operation led both sides to be more cautious.

== Background ==
=== Lend-lease ===
The Soviet leaders needed to replace the colossal losses of military equipment after the Operation Barbarossa the German invasion, especially when Soviet war industries were being moved out of the war zone and emphasised tank and aircraft deliveries. Machine tools, steel and aluminium were also needed to replace indigenous resources lost in the invasion. The pressure on the civilian sector of the economy needed to be limited by food deliveries. The Soviets wanted to concentrate the resources that remained on items that the Soviet war economy that had the greatest comparative advantage over the German economy. Aluminium imports allowed aircraft production to a far greater extent than would have been possible using local sources and tank production was emphasised at the expense of lorries and food supplies were squeezed by reliance on what could be obtained from lend–lease. At the Moscow Conference, it was acknowledged that 1.5 million tons of shipping was needed to transport the supplies of the First Protocol and that Soviet sources could provide less than 10 per cent of the carrying capacity.

The British and Americans accepted that the onus was on them to find most of the shipping, despite their commitments in other theatres. The Prime Minister, Winston Churchill, made a promise to send a convoy to the Arctic ports of the USSR every ten days and to deliver 1,200 tanks a month from July 1942 to January 1943, followed by 2,000 tanks and another 3,600 aircraft more than already promised. In November, the US president, Franklin D. Roosevelt, ordered Admiral Emory Land of the US Maritime Commission and then the head of the War Shipping Administration that deliveries to Russia should only be limited by 'insurmountable difficulties'. The first convoy was due at Murmansk around 12 October and the next convoy was to depart Iceland on 22 October. A motley of British, Allied and neutral shipping loaded with military stores and raw materials for the Soviet war effort would be assembled at Hvalfjörður in Iceland, convenient for ships from both sides of the Atlantic.

From Operation Dervish to Convoy PQ 11, the supplies to the USSR were mostly British, in British ships defended by the Royal Navy. A fighter force to defend Murmansk was delivered, that protected the Arctic ports and railways into the hinterland. Before September 1941, the British had dispatched 450 aircraft, 22,000 long tons (22,000 t) of rubber, 3,000,000 pairs of boots and stocks of tin, aluminium, jute, lead and wool. In September British and US representatives travelled to Moscow to study Soviet requirements and their ability to meet them. The representatives of the three countries drew up the First Protocol in October 1941 to last until June 1942. British supplied aircraft and tanks reinforced the Russian defences of Leningrad and Moscow from December 1941. The tanks and aircraft did not save Moscow but were important in the Soviet counter-offensive. The Luftwaffe was by then reduced to 600 operational aircraft on the Eastern Front, to an extent a consequence of Luftflotte 2 being sent to the Mediterranean against the British. Tanks and aircraft supplied by the British helped the Soviet counter-offensive force back the Germans further than might have been possible. In January and February 1941, deliveries of tanks and aircraft allowed the Russians to have a margin of safety should the Germans attempt to counter-attack.

=== Signals intelligence ===
==== Ultra ====
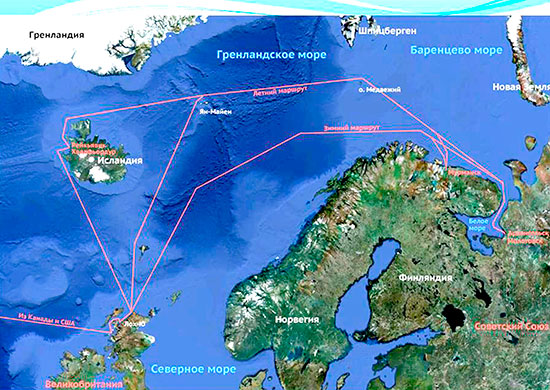
Russian map showing Arctic convoy routes from Britain and Iceland, past Norway to the Barents Sea and northern Russian ports

The British Government Code and Cypher School (GC&CS) based at Bletchley Park housed a small industry of code-breakers and traffic analysts. By June 1941, the German Enigma machine Home Waters (Heimish) settings used by surface ships and U-boats could quickly be read. On 1 February 1942, the Enigma machines used in U-boats in the Atlantic and Mediterranean were changed but German ships and the U-boats in Arctic waters continued with the older Heimish Home Hydra from 1942, Dolphin to the British). By mid-1941, British Y-stations were able to receive and read Luftwaffe W/T transmissions and give advance warning of Luftwaffe operations. In 1941, naval Headache personnel with receivers to eavesdrop on Luftwaffe wireless transmissions were embarked on warships.

=== B-Dienst ===
The rival German Beobachtungsdienst (B-Dienst, Observation Service) of the Kriegsmarine Marinenachrichtendienst (MND, Naval Intelligence Service) had broken several Admiralty codes and cyphers by 1939, which were used to help Kriegsmarine ships elude British forces and provide opportunities for surprise attacks. From June to August 1940, six British submarines were sunk in the Skaggerak using information gleaned from British wireless signals. In 1941, B-Dienst read signals from the Commander in Chief Western Approaches informing convoys of areas patrolled by U-boats, enabling the submarines to move into "safe" zones. By early 1942, B-Dienst was reading Naval Cypher No. 2 and the new Naval Cypher No. 3 but not fast enough for the results to have tactical effect and relied on traffic analysis.

=== Arctic Ocean ===
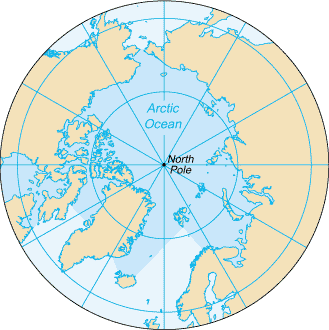
Diagram of the Arctic Ocean

Between Greenland and Norway are some of the most stormy waters of the world's oceans, 890 mi (1,440 km) of water under gales of snow, sleet and hail. The cold Arctic water was met by the Gulf Stream, warm water from the Gulf of Mexico, which became the North Atlantic Drift. Arriving at the south-west of England the drift moves between Scotland and Iceland; north of Norway the drift splits. One stream bears north of Bear Island to Svalbard and a southern stream follows the coast of Murmansk into the Barents Sea. The mingling of cold Arctic water and warmer water of higher salinity generates thick banks of fog for convoys to hide in but the waters drastically reduced the effectiveness of ASDIC as U-boats moved in waters of differing temperatures and density.

In winter, polar ice can form as far south as 50 mi (80 km) off the North Cape and in summer it can recede to Svalbard. The area is in perpetual darkness in winter and permanent daylight in the summer and can make air reconnaissance almost impossible. Around the North Cape and in the Barents Sea the sea temperature rarely rises about 4 °C (39 °F) and a man in the water will die unless rescued immediately. The cold water and air makes spray freeze on the superstructure of ships, which has to be removed quickly to avoid the ship becoming top-heavy. Conditions in U-boats were, if anything, worse the boats having to submerge in warmer water to rid the superstructure of ice. Crewmen on watch were exposed to the elements, oil lost its viscosity and nuts froze and sheared off bolts. Heaters in the hull were too demanding of current and could not be run continuously.

== Prelude ==
=== Kriegsmarine ===
German naval forces in Norway were commanded by Hermann Böhm, the Kommandierender Admiral Norwegen. Two U-boats were based in Norway in July 1941, four in September, five in December and four in January 1942. Hitler contemplated establishing a unified command but decided against it. The German battleship Tirpitz arrived at Trondheim on 16 January, the first ship of a general move of surface ships to Norway. British convoys to Russia had received little attention since they averaged only eight ships each and the long Arctic winter nights negated even the limited Luftwaffe reconnaissance effort that was available. The reinforcement of the Arctic U-boats eventually led to about 25 being in the area, sufficient to keep about eight boats at sea. The primitive facilities at Kirkenes and Narvik meant that the boats there had to go to Trondheim for more than minor repairs. In February the U-boats had achieved nothing.

=== Luftflotte 5 ===
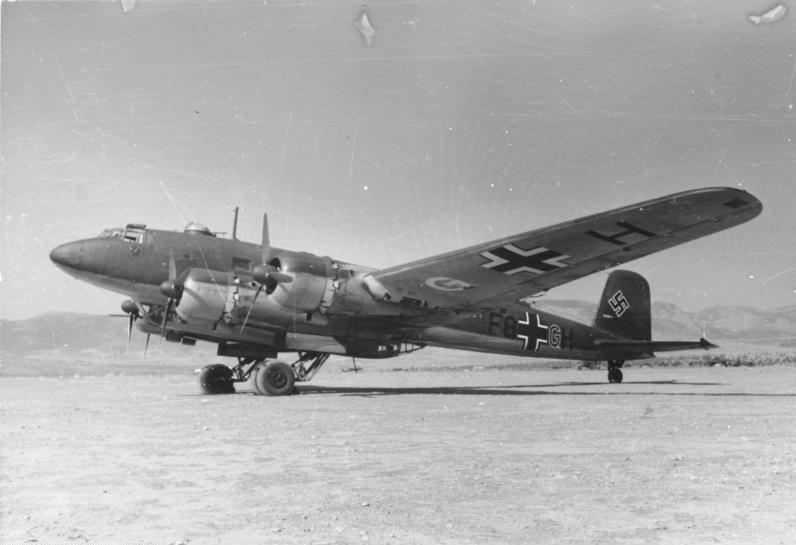
A Focke-Wulf Fw 200 Kondor of KG 40

In mid-1941, Luftflotte 5 (Air Fleet 5) had been re-organised for Operation Barbarossa with Luftgau Norwegen (Air Region Norway) headquartered in Oslo. Fliegerführer Stavanger (Air Commander Stavanger) the centre and north of Norway, Jagdfliegerführer Norwegen (Fighter Leader Norway) commanded the fighter force and Fliegerführer Kerkenes (Oberst [colonel] Andreas Nielsen) in the far north had airfields at Kirkenes and Banak. The Air Fleet had 180 aircraft, sixty of which were reserved for operations on the Karelian Front against the Red Army.

The distance from Banak to Arkhangelsk was 560 mi (900 km) and Fliegerführer Kerkenes had only ten Junkers Ju 88 bombers of Kampfgeschwader 30, thirty Junkers Ju 87 Stuka dive-bombers ten Messerschmitt Bf 109 fighters of Jagdgeschwader 77, five Messerschmitt Bf 110 heavy fighters of Zerstörergeschwader 76, ten reconnaissance aircraft and an anti-aircraft battalion. Sixty aircraft were far from adequate in such a climate and terrain where

...there is no favourable season for operations. (Earl Ziemke [1959] in Claasen [2001])

The emphasis of air operations changed from army support to anti-shipping operations only after March 1942, when Allied Arctic convoys becoming larger and more frequent coincided with the reinforcement of Norway with ships and aircraft and the less extreme climatic conditions of the Arctic summer.

=== Arctic convoys ===
A convoy was defined as at least one merchant ship sailing under the protection of at least one warship. At first the British had intended to run convoys to Russia on a forty-day cycle (the number of days between convoy departures) during the winter of 1941–1942, but this was shortened to a ten-day cycle. The round trip to Murmansk for warships was three weeks and each convoy needed a cruiser and two destroyers, which severely depleted the Home Fleet. Convoys left port and rendezvoused with the escorts at sea. A cruiser provided distant cover from a position to the west of Bear Island. Air support was limited to 330 Squadron and 269 Squadron of RAF Coastal Command from Iceland, with some help from anti-submarine patrols along the coast of Norway from RAF Sullom Voe in Shetland. Anti-submarine trawlers escorted the convoys on the first part of the outward voyage. Built for Arctic conditions, the trawlers were coal-burning ships and had sufficient endurance. The trawlers were commanded by their peacetime crews and captains with the rank of Skipper, Royal Naval Reserve (RNR) who were used to Arctic conditions, supplied by anti-submarine specialists of the Royal Naval Volunteer Reserve (RNVR). British minesweepers based at Arkhangelsk met the convoys to join the escort for the remainder of the voyage.

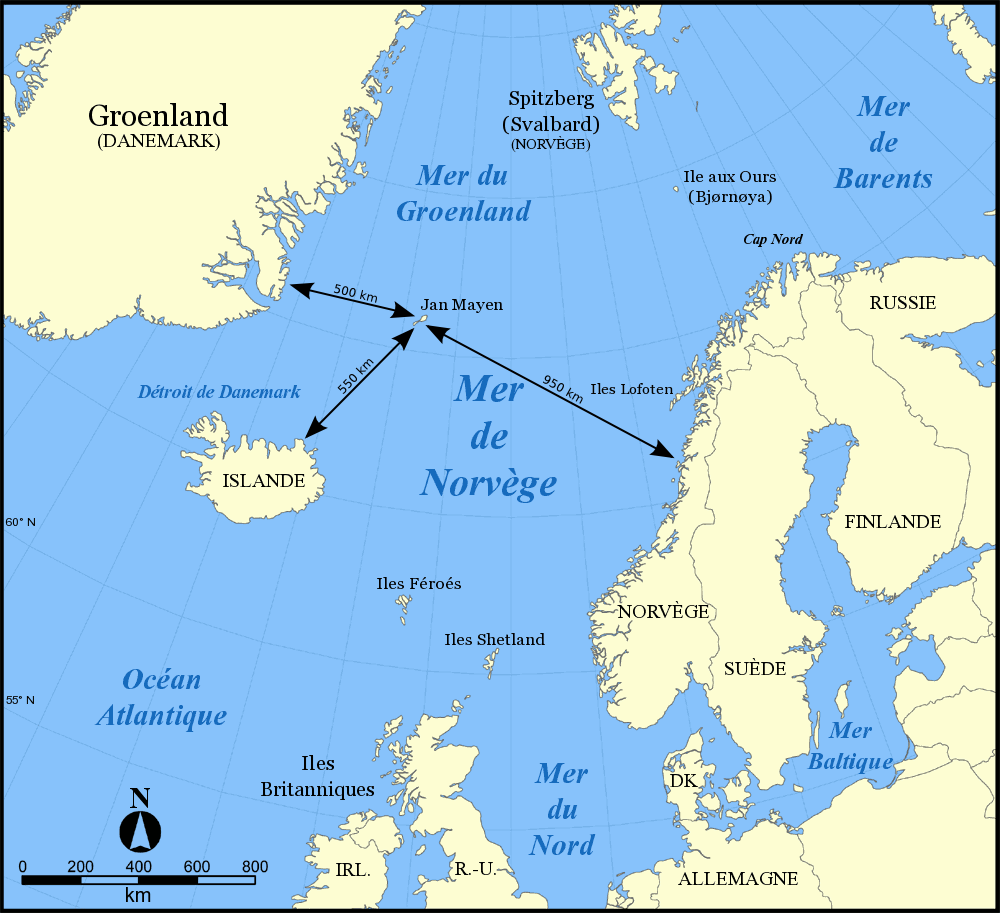
Map showing Jan Mayen in the Norwegian Sea

Convoy PQ 11 (14–22 February 1942) had arrived at Murmansk unscathed but the Admiralty thought that the run of good luck could not last. The arrival of the German battleship Tirpitz at Trondheim from the Baltic Sea, coinciding with the lengthening hours of daylight and the moderation of the weather in the Arctic, when the melting of the Polar ice would take another two to three months meant that the tactical balance would favour German anti-shipping operations by aircraft, U-boats and ships. The commander of the Home Fleet, Admiral John Tovey, predicted that attacks by German ships would occur between Jan Mayen and Bjørnøya (Bear Island). The area between Bjørnøya and Murmansk would be left to aircraft and U-boats.

The Home Fleet would have to cover the PQ and QP convoys west of Jan Mayen and to limit the strain on crews and ships, Tovey asked on 26 February that outbound PQ convoys would sail at the same time as a return QP convoys. Convoy QP 8 and Convoy PQ 12 were to be the first synchronous pair of convoys, to cross over south of Bjørnøya. More close escorts were to accompany convoys, RAF Coastal Command was to observe the fjords around Trondheim and long-range B-24 Liberators flew from Iceland, reconnoitring to the north-east. More British and Soviet submarines were to keep watch over the Norwegian coast to provide warnings of sailings by Kriegsmarine ships.

=== Convoy ===
The convoy comprised SS Atlantic, MV British Pride, SS British Workman, SS Cold Harbor, SS El Lago, MV Elona, SS Empire Selwyn, SS Explorer, SS Friedrich Engels, SS Ijora, SS Larranga, MV Noreg, MV Revolutsioner, SS Tbilisi and SS West Nohno. The Eastern Ocean Escort was provided by two Halcyon-class minesweepers of the 6th Minesweeper Squadron, HMS Harrier and HMS Sharpshooter to sunrise on 3 March and the Soviet destroyers Gremyashchy and Gromky until nightfall.

== Voyage ==
=== 1−2 March ===
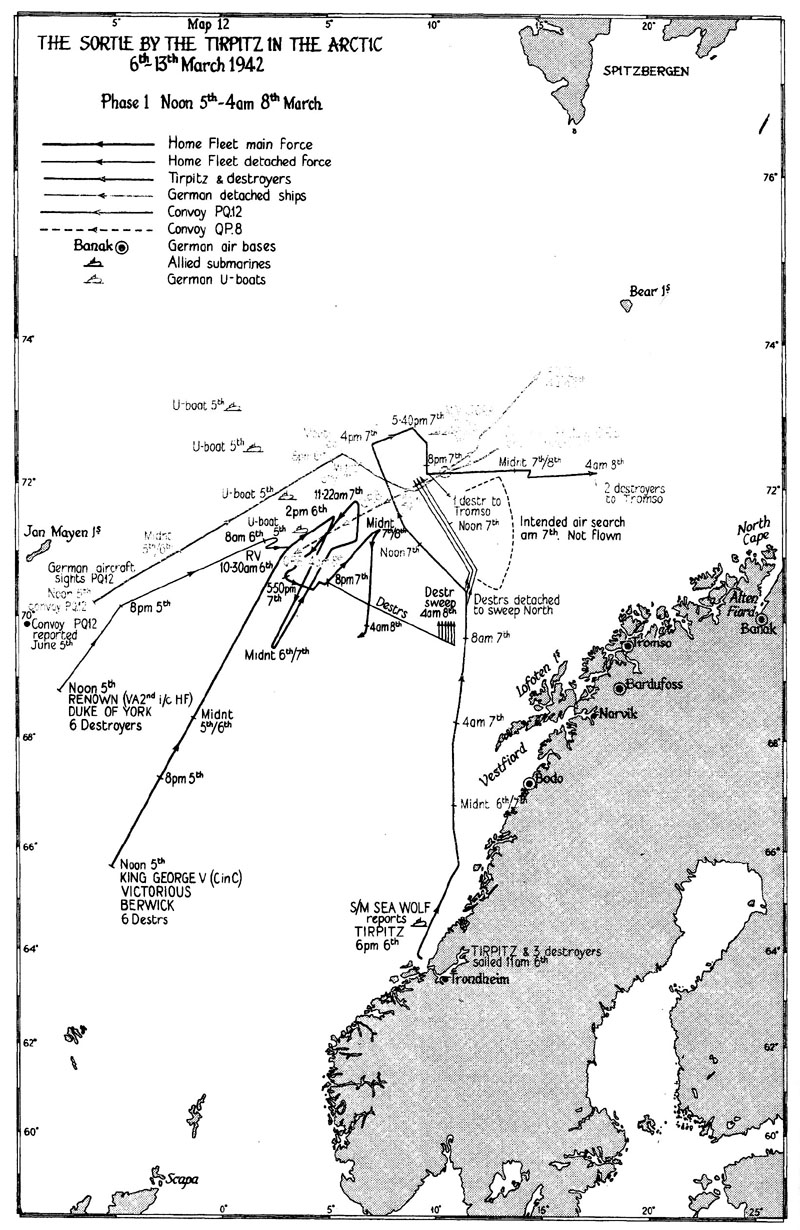
A diagram of the first phase of Unternehmen Sportpalast 12:00 p.m. 5 March − 4:00 a.m. 8 March 1942

The convoy was held back for four days, until 1 March to sail on the same day as its reciprocal, Convoy PQ 12. The fifteen merchant vessels sailed as eighteen ships of Convoy PQ 12 left Iceland, the inaugural convoy operation supported by the Home Fleet. The Eastern Local Escort of the British minesweepers Harrier and Sharpshooter swept the convoy out of Murmansk with the Soviet destroyers Gremyashchy and Gromky. The convoy ocean escort of two minesweepers and two corvettes, commanded by Lieutenant-Commander John Seymour, had suffered several defects. The Asdic on Salamander did not work properly, the set on Sweetbriar became unserviceable on 3 March and the radar set on Oxlip was not operational.

=== 3 March ===
On 3 March the Eastern Local Escort had departed for its return to Murmansk, the two Soviet destroyers having been something of a nuisance, conducting sweeps without communicating their intentions, that affected the Asdic set on Hazard and wanting to return before the scheduled time. The Ocean Escort had accompanied the convoy from Murmansk and comprised the Halcyon-class minesweepers HMS Hazard and Salamander, with HMS Oxlip and Sweetbriar, two Flower-class corvettes. From 2 to 7 March the Fiji-class cruiser HMS Nigeria apparently covered the convoy at a distance but there was no sign of it early in the voyage. After a U-boat alarm, the convoy turned west at 73°15′N, 37°10′E, the sea state being calm.

=== 4–6 March ===
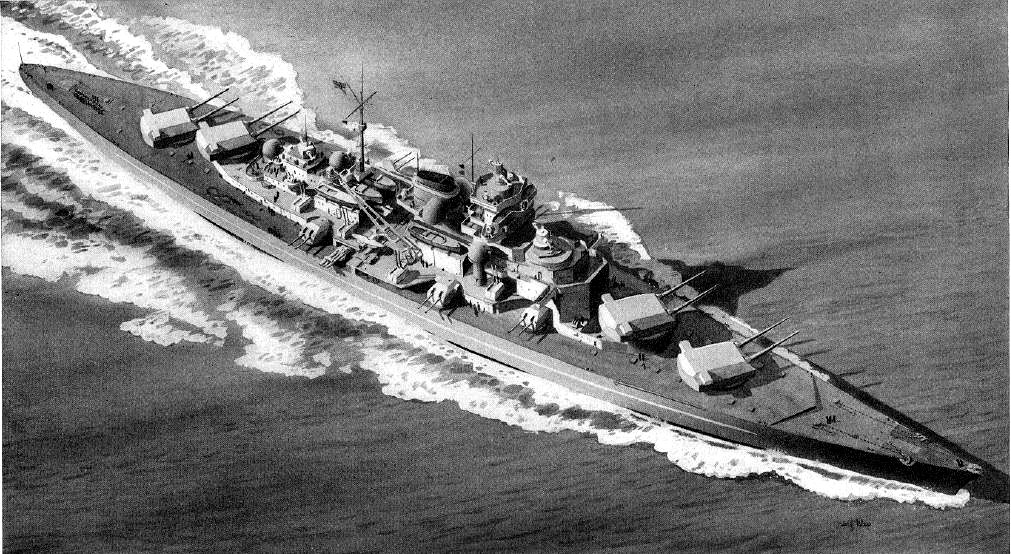
US Navy identification drawing of Tirpitz

During the night of 3/4 March a gale blew up and by the morning, windage (the force imparted by a high wind on an object) had stopped the forward motion of some of the ships. As the ships fell bows-first into a trough in the waves, their propellers rose out of the water, maintaining steerage way but little else.The gale scattered the ships and when the convoy re-assembled and by dawn on 5 March, Ijora and Larranga were not to be seen; the Soviet destroyer Gromky had damaged as it returned to Murmansk. On 6 March Tirpitz sailed, accompanied by the destroyers Z5 Paul Jacobi, Z7 Hermann Schoemann, Friedrich Ihn and Z25. At noon, another storm scattered the convoy again but the ships kept contact and re-formed, albeit delayed. At 7:40 p.m. the British submarine HMS Seawolf signalled that a big German ship was off Trondheim, heading north.

=== 7 March ===
Passing Convoy PQ 12 at noon on 7 March, 200 nmi (370 km; 230 mi) south-west of Bear Island, the ships sailing through each other's columns. Convoy QP 8 had received its first accurate positional fix from Kenya, that revealed that the convoy position was wrong by 95 nmi (176 km; 109 mi). (Note: Position errors in such high latitudes where meridians converge and when no accurate sightings can be taken. The effect of the weather and the difficulty in measuring the speed of forward motion in such conditions.) Two hours after crossing over, Convoy QP 8 turned south to avoid pack ice that Convoy PQ 12 had run into. Vice-Admiral Otto Ciliax, commanding the German flotilla, having lost the benefit of air reconnaissance due the weather, sent the destroyers north to scout in line abreast. The destroyers turned to the north-west, with Tirpitz on the southern wing and the destroyers spread out to the north, covering a considerable area of sea. The U-boats U-134, U-377, U-403 and U-584 were also waiting across the track of the convoys. The German ships missed Convoy PQ 12 having underestimated its speed by 2 kn (3.7 km/h; 2.3 mph) and being 30–60 nmi (56–111 km; 35–69 mi) to its south, heading for the route of Convoy QP 8.

Tovey, with the Home Fleet, had thought that the convoy was west of him, rather than 100 nmi (190 km; 120 mi) to the north-east. The Home Fleet was heading away from both convoys, looking for better weather. The amount of wireless traffic suggested to Seymour that something was happening but he remained ignorant of the fact that Tirpitz was 50 nmi (93 km; 58 mi) in advance of Convoy QP 8 and that the destroyer Z25 was only about 12 nmi (22 km; 14 mi) distant. Kenya investigated smoke in the distance and found a ship (probably Ijora) that had straggled and then returned to Convoy QP 8. soon afterwards, Kenya received a signal from the Admiralty that a German flotilla might be near Convoy PQ 12. Wireless operators in both convoys received a signal from Ijora that it was under attack by German destroyers. The position broadcast by Ijora was considered questionable given the erroneous position of Convoy QP 8 noted earlier in the day. The Home Fleet also received the signal from Ijora and Tovey turned east at 5:50 p.m. and to the north at 8:00 p.m. Tovey detached six destroyers to sweep to the north at 15 kn (28 km/h; 17 mph) to cross the line of the German retirement towards its base but Tirpitz was 150 nmi (280 km; 170 mi) northwards. Ciliax also hard the distress call from Ijora and arrived as Ijora was sunk by Friedrich Ihn.

=== 8–11 March ===
At about 8:00 a.m. Convoy QP 8 was making 9 kn (17 km/h; 10 mph). The convoy was reinforced briefly by the heavy cruisers HMS Kent and HMS London that were transferred from Patrol White in the Denmark Strait where they had been on watch three ships of the US Navy. HMS Trinidad and Liverpool were dispatched from Seyðisfjörður with destroyers that had refuelled, HMS Echo, Fury and Punjabi. Two cruisers each were stationed 200 nmi (370 km; 230 mi) to the east and two to the south of Jan Mayen as refuelling forces. After dividing on 9 March, the convoy arrived at Iceland on 11 March, part at Hvalfjord escorted by Oxlip and Sweetbriar and the other ships at Akureyri with Hazard and Salamander.

== Aftermath ==
=== Analysis ===
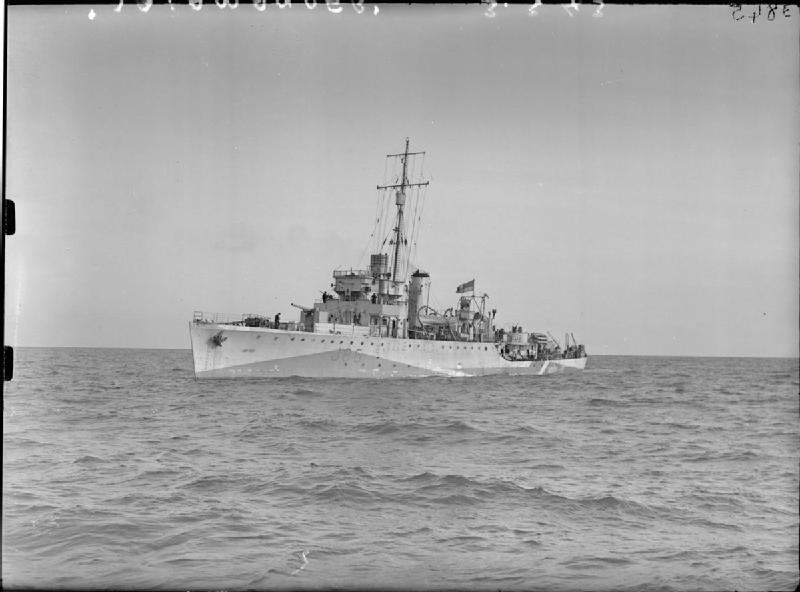
HMS Salamander, a Halcyon-class minesweeper

Convoy QP 8 was the first of a run of return convoys since Convoy QP 1, that suffered losses from German action. As the hours of daylight increased during the Arctic spring until the summer solstice, the Luftwaffe had less difficulty in finding Allied convoys.

The head of the Kriegsmarine, Generaladmiral Erich Raeder, knew that the conditions were favourable for Arctic convoys and also made German coastal traffic vulnerable to attack,

...the British realise the vital importance of the sea route off the Arctic coast for supply of the German forces.

That the British had not raided German shipping only served to increase apprehensions in the Seekriegsleitung (the German naval staff) who expected them imminently to begin; Raeder complained to Hitler about the lack of Luftwaffe reconnaissance.

In 1994, Richard Woodman wrote that the near-disaster suffered by the Germans, when British torpedo-bombers attacked Tirpitz, reinforced German apprehensions about the use of ships against Arctic convoys. The importance to the Soviet war effort of the contents of the convoys was understood in Berlin to explain the Soviet counter-offensive at Moscow (5 December 1941 – 6 May 1942). Hitler ordered a maximum effort against the convoys, including accelerating work on the aircraft carrier Graf Zeppelin. Tovey continued with the view that part of the Home Fleet should provide heavy cover for the convoys, led by his vice-admiral, Alban Curteis, while Tovey in the flagship, with the aircraft carrier and destroyer escorts should attack ships making sorties against the convoys.

The First Sea Lord, Admiral Dudley Pound, disagreed and wanted the Home Fleet to stay concentrated. Pound was privy to Ultra and took the view that Tirpitz had benefited from the weather to manage a lucky escape. Tovey chafed at being commanded from the Admiralty, even though from 6–13 March he had delegated control of the light cruisers and destroyers. Tovey also took the view that sinking Tirpitz was

...of incomparably greater importance to the conduct of the war than the safety of any convoy.

Woodman wrote, "…it is doubtful if any of the men sailing in the merchant ships and escorts in the remaining PQ and QP convoys to be dispatched that year would have agreed with him". The Admiralty insisted that convoy protection should have priority. Tovey and the Admiralty agreed that the Home Fleet should stay west of Bjørnøya during convoy operations that would limit its effect. The threat from German aircraft and U-boats was by far the most significant as the German effort against the convoys increased.

In "Germany and the Second World War" (2001) Werner Rahn wrote that Group Command North complained that the Luftwaffe was far inferior to the British,

The result is the grotesque picture of the enemy chasing us in our own coastal waters, while himself sailing there unchallenged.

Raeder told Hitler that, on the northern front, the German defences were feeble and that reserving forces to repel an invasion compromised their anti-convoy effectiveness. Raeder wanted the Luftwaffe effort to improve against aircraft-carriers in particular.

=== Signals intelligence ===
In 2023, David Kenyon wrote that the Tirpitz war diary contains comment that a lack of signals traffic should not be inferred to mean the absence of the Home Fleet. When Ijora managed to send a distress signal, the diarist wrot that it must be assumed that the convoys would change course and that the Home Fleet would sail. The departure of Tirpitz from Trondheim (Drontheim) during day made it probable that the British had been tipped off by the Norwegian resistance. Kenyon wrote that the German theory that the signal from Ijora "let the cat out of the bag" was credible because the British must had taken precautions once Tirpitz had arrived in Norway.

The British signals intelligence organisation had been more effective than B-Dienst. Decrypts of Enigma messages from the Kriegsmarine and the Luftwaffe yielded valuable information on the locations of ships, U-boats and aircraft. After the operation, there were recriminations about the use that Tovey put the information and finger-wagging by the Operational Intelligence Centre and the code-breakers at Bletchley Park. During 8–9 March, German Enigma signals were being read within three ours of reception when The British torpedo-bomber attack on Tirpitz was being prepared. Over the previous two days of 6–7 March, decryption had taken more than twenty-four hours. The sighting by the submarine Seawolf had been fortuitous because an Ultra decrypt only reached Tovey on 7 March at 3:00 p.m. about 28 hours after the German flotilla had sailed. Had Tovey not been informed of the sighting the German ships might have been a day ahead of the British.

== Allied order of battle ==
=== Convoyed ships ===
Merchant ships (Note: Convoys had a standard formation of short columns, number 1 to the left in the direction of travel. Each position in the column was numbered; 11 was the first ship in column 1 and 12 was the second ship in the column; 21 was the first ship in column 2.)
Ship	Year	Flag	GRT	Notes
Murmansk to Hvalfjörður and Akureyri
SS Atlantic	1939	Merchant Navy	5,414	
MV British Pride	1931	Merchant Navy	7,106	
SS British Workman	1922	Merchant Navy	6,994	
SS Cold Harbor	1920	Panama	5,010	
SS El Lago	1920	Panama	4,221	
MV Elona	1936	Merchant Navy	6,192	
SS Empire Selwyn	1941	Merchant Navy	7,167	
SS Explorer	1935	Merchant Navy	6,235	
SS Friedrich Engels	1930	Soviet Union	3,972	
SS Ijora	1921	Soviet Union	2,815	Sunk, 7 March, Friedrich Ihn
SS Larranga	1917	United States	3,804	
MV Noreg	1931	Norway	7,605	Tanker
MV Revolutsioner	1936	Soviet Union	2,900	
SS Tbilisi	1912	Soviet Union	7,169	
SS West Nohno	1919	United States	5,769	

=== Escorts ===
Escort forces (in relays)
Ship	Flag	Type	Notes
Eastern Local Escort (relays)
HMS Harrier	Royal Navy	Halcyon-class minesweeper	1–3 March 1942
HMS Sharpshooter	Royal Navy	Halcyon-class minesweeper	1–3 March 1942
Gremyashchy	Soviet Navy	Gnevny-class destroyer	1–3 February 1942 (night)
Gromky	Soviet Navy	Gnevny-class destroyer	(Night) 1–3 February 1942 (night)
Ocean escort
HMS Nigeria	Royal Navy	Fiji-class cruiser	2–7 March 1942
HMS Hazard	Royal Navy	Halcyon-class minesweeper	1–11 March 1942
HMS Salamander	Royal Navy	Halcyon-class minesweeper	1–11 March 1942
HMS Oxlip	Royal Navy	Flower-class corvette	1–11 March 1942
HMS Sweetbriar	Royal Navy	Flower-class corvette	1–11 March 1942
Reinforcements
HMS Kent	Royal Navy	County-class cruiser	7–9 March 1942
HMS London	Royal Navy	County-class cruiser	7–9 March 1942
Allied submarines
HMS Sealion	Royal Navy	S-class submarine	Convoy cover
HMS Seawolf	Royal Navy	S-class submarine	Convoy cover
HMS Trident	Royal Navy	Triton-class submarine	Convoy cover
HNoMS Uredd	Royal Norwegian Navy	U-class submarine	Convoy cover
Junon	Free French Naval Forces	Minerve-class submarine	Convoy cover
D-3	Soviet Navy	Dekabrist-class submarine	Convoy cover
K-21	Soviet Navy	Soviet K-class submarine	Convoy cover
K-23	Soviet Navy	Soviet K-class submarine	Convoy cover
S-102	Soviet Navy	Soviet S-class submarine	Convoy cover
Shch-403	Soviet Navy	Shchuka-class submarine	Convoy cover
Shch-422	Soviet Navy	Shchuka-class submarine	Convoy cover

== German order of battle ==
=== U-boats and ships ===
Kriegsmarine
Name	Flag	Class	Notes
gruppe Werwolf
U-134	Kriegsmarine	Type VIIC submarine	
U-377	Kriegsmarine	Type VIIC submarine	
U-403	Kriegsmarine	Type VIIC submarine	
U-584	Kriegsmarine	Type VIIC submarine	
Ships
Tirpitz	Kriegsmarine	Bismarck-class battleship	
Z5 Paul Jacobi	Kriegsmarine	Type 1934A-class destroyer	
Z7 Hermann Schoemann	Kriegsmarine	Type 1934A-class destroyer	
Z14 Friedrich Ihn	Kriegsmarine	Type 1934A-class destroyer	
Z25	Kriegsmarine	Type 1936A-class destroyer	

== Bibliography ==
- Blair, Clay (1997). Hitler's U-boat War: The Hunters 1939−1942. London: Weidenfeld & Nicolson. ISBN 0-297-84076-2.
- Boog, H.; Rahn, W.; Stumpf, R.; Wegner, B. (2001). The Global War: Widening of the Conflict into a World War and the Shift of the Initiative 1941–1943. Germany in the Second World War. Vol. VI. Translated by Osers, E.; Brownjohn, J.; Crampton, P.; Willmot, L. (Eng trans. Oxford University Press, London ed.). Potsdam: Militärgeschichtliches Forschungsamt (Research Institute for Military History). ISBN 0-19-822888-0.
  - Rahn, W. "Part III The War at Sea in the Atlantic and in the Arctic Ocean III. The Conduct of the War in the Atlantic and the Coastal Area (b) The Third Phase, April–December 1941: The Extension of the Areas of Operations". In Boog et al. (2001).
- Boyd, Andrew (2024). Arms for Russia & the Naval War in the Arctic 1941–1945. Barnsley: Seaforth (Pen & Sword). ISBN 978-1-3990-3886-7.
- Claasen, A. R. A. (2001). Hitler's Northern War: The Luftwaffe's Ill-fated Campaign, 1940–1945. Lawrence, KS: University Press of Kansas. ISBN 0-7006-1050-2.
- Hancock, W. K.; Gowing, M. M. (1949). Hancock, W. K. (ed.). British War Economy. History of the Second World War, United Kingdom Civil Series. London: HMSO. OCLC 630191560.
- Hinsley, F. H. (1994) [1993]. British Intelligence in the Second World War: Its Influence on Strategy and Operations. History of the Second World War, United Kingdom Military Series (2nd rev. abr. ed.). London: HMSO. ISBN 978-0-11-630961-7.
- Jordan, Roger W. (2006) [1999]. The World's Merchant Fleets 1939: The Particulars and Wartime Fates of 6,000 Ships (2nd ed.). London: Chatham/Lionel Leventhal. ISBN 978-1-86176-293-1.
- Kahn, D. (1973) [1967]. The Codebreakers: The Story of Secret Writing (10th abr. Signet, Chicago ed.). New York: Macmillan. LCCN 63-16109. OCLC 78083316.
- Kenyon, David (2023). Arctic Convoys: Bletchley Park and the War for the Seas. New Haven & London: Yale University Press. ISBN 978-0-300-27501-8.
- Macksey, K. (2004) [2003]. The Searchers: Radio Intercept in two World Wars (Cassell Military Paperbacks ed.). London: Cassell. ISBN 978-0-304-36651-4.
- Mitchell, W. H.; Sawyer, L. A. (1990). The Empire Ships (2nd ed.). London, New York, Hamburg, Hong Kong: Lloyd's of London Press Ltd. ISBN 1-85044-275-4.
- Paterson, Lawrence (2016). Steel and Ice: The U-boat Battle in the Arctic and Black Sea 1941–45. Stroud: The History Press. ISBN 978-1-59114-258-4.
- Rohwer, Jürgen; Hümmelchen, Gerhard (2005) [1972]. Chronology of the War at Sea, 1939–1945: The Naval History of World War Two (3rd rev. ed.). London: Chatham. ISBN 978-1-86176-257-3.
- Roskill, S. W. (1957) [1954]. Butler, J. R. M. (ed.). The War at Sea 1939–1945: The Defensive. History of the Second World War United Kingdom Military Series. Vol. I (4th impr. ed.). London: HMSO. OCLC 881709135. Archived from the original on 27 February 2022.
- Roskill, S. W. (1962) [1956]. The Period of Balance. History of the Second World War: The War at Sea 1939–1945. Vol. II. London: HMSO. OCLC 174453986. Archived from the original on 6 March 2014.
- Ruegg, R.; Hague, A. (1993) [1992]. Convoys to Russia: Allied Convoys and Naval Surface Operations in Arctic Waters 1941–1945 (2nd rev. enl. ed.). Kendal: World Ship Society. ISBN 0-905617-66-5.
- Vleggeert, Nico (15 September 2013). "SS Ijora". wrecksite.eu.
- Woodman, Richard (1994). Arctic Convoys 1941–1945 (hbk. ed.). London: John Murray. ISBN 0-7195-5079-3.
- Woodman, Richard (2004) [1994]. Arctic Convoys 1941–1945. London: John Murray. ISBN 978-0-7195-5752-1.
- Ziemke, Earl F. (1959). The German Northern Theatre of Operations, 1940–1945. Washington, DC: Headquarters, United States Department of the Army. OCLC 610363660. 20-271.
