= The Explorer =

The Explorer or The Explorers may refer to:

== Arts, entertainment and media ==
=== Film and television ===
- The Explorer (film), a lost 1915 American adventure
- The Explorer Channel, of PBS North Carolina
- The Explorers, a French ultra-HD documentary series by The Explorer Network and Ultra Nature
- The Explorers, a 1968 film and a marionette production by Peter Scriven
- The Explorers, a 1973 ABC TV series by Andrew Solt
- The Explorers, a 1975 BBC series, narrated by David Attenborough
- "The Explorer", a 1960 episode of the Alcoa Presents One Step Beyond anthology
- "The Explorers", a 1986 episode of Rainbow
- "The Explorers", a 2016 episode of I Want My Phone Back
- "The Explorers", guests on Hyori's Homestay, 2017
- "The Explorers", a 1960 episode of Lassie

=== Literature ===
- The Explorer (novel), by Frances Parkinson Keyes, 1964
- The Explorer, a novel by W. Somerset Maugham, 1908
- The Explorer, a 1975 novel by Philip Temple
- The Explorer, a 2017 children's book by Katherine Rundell
- The Explorer, student newspaper of Hudson High School (Ohio), U.S.
- "The Explorer", a poem by Rudyard Kipling from his 1903 collection The Five Nations
- The Explorers (collection), of science fiction stories, by C. M. Kornbluth
- The Explorers, a 1982 book by Vivian Stuart (as William Stuart Long)
- The Explorers, a 2013 children's book by Oren Ginzburg
- The Explorers and Other Poems, an 1874 volume by Catherine Edith Macauley Martin
- The Explorers, a volume of the Snowpiercer graphic novel series
- The Explorers, a magazine founded in 1957 by Lu Wenfu
- "The Explorers", a chapter of Alaska by James A. Michener
- The Northwest Explorer, a weekly newspaper in Tucson, Arizona, U.S.
- Ang Tagatuklas ('The Explorer'), official publication of Regional Science High School for Region 1, Philippines

=== Music ===
- The Explorers, a 1980's rock band of Phil Manzanera, Andy Mackay and James Wraith, and their 1985 album
- The Explorer (album), by E-Type, 1996
- "The Explorer", a song by D.R.I. from the 1985 album Dealing with It!
- "The Explorer", a song by Shotgun Messiah from the 1989 album Shotgun Messiah
- "The Explorer", a song by Steve Howe from the 2011 album Time
- "The Explorer", a song by Vintersorg from the 2002 album Visions from the Spiral Generator
- The Explorer, or To Boldly Go..., a 1992 composition by James Oliverio
- "The Explorers", a 2009 single by CFCF
- The Explorers: A Century of Discovery, its 1988 soundtrack by Lee Holdridge

=== Other uses in arts, entertainment and media ===
- The Explorer, a character in Cirque du Soleil's show Quidam
- The Explorer, a 1999 sculpture by Ng Eng Teng
- The Explorers (play), about the Burke and Wills expedition, by John Sandford, 1952

== Businesses and organisations ==
- The Explorer Group, now Hymer, a British manufacturer of caravans
- The Explorer Motor Company, a proposed manufacturer of futuristic Straker cars used in British TV series UFO (British TV series)

== Sports ==
- Aguada Explorers, American baseball team
- Bradenton Explorers, American baseball team
- Kansas City Explorers, former American tennis team
- La Salle Explorers, varsity sports teams from La Salle University, U.S.
- Sioux City Explorers, American baseball team

== See also ==
- Explorer (disambiguation)
- Dora the Explorer (disambiguation)
- The Explorers Club, an international society
