= Attack on the battleship Tirpitz by submarine K-21 =

1942 World War II attack on the German battleship Tirpitz

Attack on the battleship Tirpitz by the submarine K-21
- Part of World War II
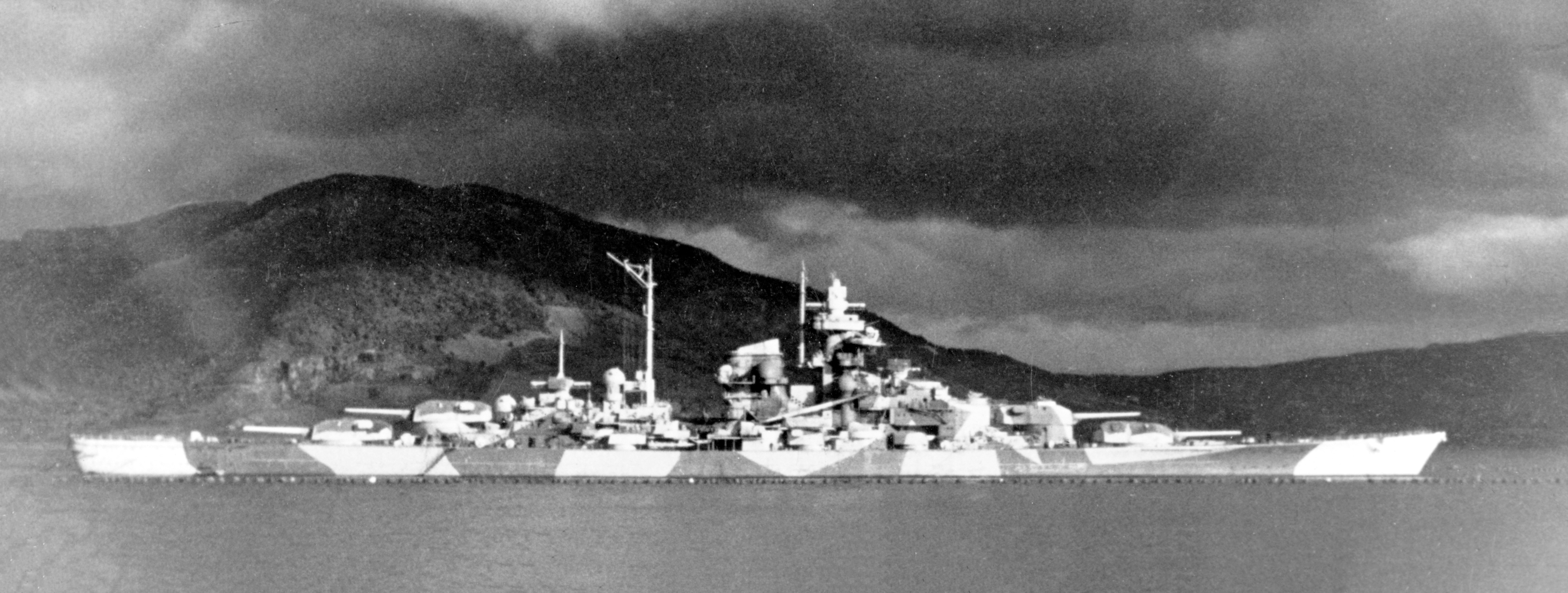
- Battleship Tirpitz in the Norwegian Altafjord
| Date | 5 July 1942 |
| Location | the border of the Norwegian Sea and Barents Sea 71°35′N 24°53′E |
| Result | Failed attack |

Belligerents
| Soviet Union | Germany |

Commanders and leaders
| (Soviet Union) Nikolai Lunin | (Nazi Germany) Otto Schniewind |

Strength
| submarine K-21 | battleship Tirpitz, heavy cruisers Admiral Scheer and Admiral Hipper, 7 destroyers and 2 torpedo boats |

Casualties and losses
| no casualties | no casualties |

On 5 July 1942, the German battleship Tirpitz, sailing as part of a squadron under the command of Admiral Otto Schniewind to intercept convoy PQ 17, was attacked by the Soviet submarine K-21, commanded by Captain Second Rank Nikolai Lunin. The submarine fired four torpedoes from a considerable distance. The result of the attack was not directly observed by Lunin, but the sounds of explosions were noted, which he interpreted as the result of torpedo hits. This was the basis for Soviet press claims that the battleship had been damaged. However, no torpedo hits were noted on the German squadron, and moreover, the attack itself was not detected. The German ships continued on their original course for approximately five hours, after which they turned back due to the inherent riskiness of the operation and the futility of continuing it against a convoy that had effectively ceased to exist as a unified entity.

In the Soviet Union, literature aimed at the masses was dominated by an opinion of the success of the attack. This was based on the Sovinformburo report and wartime press articles. The historiography of foreign countries initially concurred that the Tirpitz had not been struck by torpedoes, given the absence of documentary evidence attesting to the success of the attack. This evidence was not present in German documents or the memoirs of the participants on the German side. Following the return of the squadron, the battleship Tirpitz did not require repairs. A British-led team, including a Soviet specialist, conducted an examination of the hull of the battleship, which had been sunk in 1944. The examination revealed no evidence of torpedo hits or repairs on the ship. A contemporary reconstruction, based on the fullest available evidence, demonstrates that the attack had no theoretical possibility of success, given that the torpedoes were launched from a distance exceeding their maximum range. Nevertheless, the event is of significant historical importance to the Russian Navy, as it represents the only instance of Soviet submariners launching an attack against a heavy (larger than a destroyer) enemy warship.

== Background ==
On 27 June 1942, the convoy PQ 17, one of the Arctic convoys that delivered weapons and resources necessary for the war effort to the USSR, commenced its journey from Iceland to Arkhangelsk. The 35 transports of the convoy carried cargo consisting of 297 aircraft, 594 tanks, over 4,000 vehicles and more than 156,000 tonnes of other cargo. Convoying this convoy entailed a significant degree of risk. The German aviation, which had numerical superiority in the Barents Sea area, was able to operate around the clock due to polar day and favourable weather conditions. The utilisation of enemy submarines and surface ships was also greatly facilitated by this circumstance. Nonetheless, for political reasons (in the summer of 1942, the situation at the front for the Soviet Union was critical and the country was in dire need of assistance), the British War Cabinet, headed by W. Churchill, decided to send the convoy. Its protection was provided by a close protection force of 19 warships and two submarines, a close protection cruiser force of four heavy cruisers and two destroyers, and a long-range protection force of an aircraft carrier, two battleships, two cruisers and 12 destroyers. Furthermore, a curtain of 13 submarines – comprising eight British, four Soviet and one French vessel – was positioned in the vicinity of potential German surface ship transit routes. At the same time, there were significant limitations on the use of these forces - the cruiser and long-range cover detachments could not operate east of Bear Island due to limited fuel reserves and the risk of enemy aircraft attack.

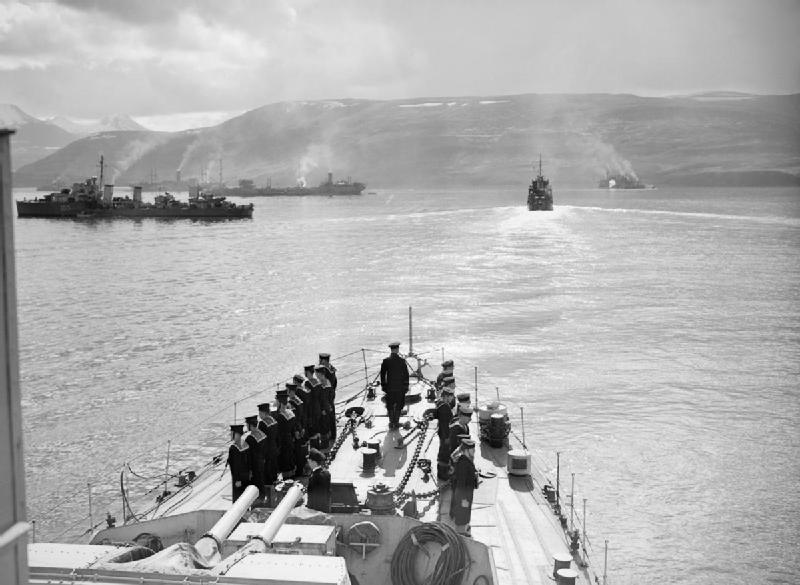
PQ-17 convoy ships shortly before departure from Iceland

Simultaneously, the German military was formulating a strategy to thwart the convoy. In addition to the deployment of aircraft and submarines, the plan included the use of large surface vessels. The operation, designated as Rösselsprung, or "Horse Walk," permitted the utilization of all available heavy German naval vessels in Norway, including the battleship Tirpitz, heavy cruisers Admiral Scheer, Lützow, and Admiral Hipper, and their respective escorts.

On 1 July, the convoy was identified by German aerial reconnaissance, and by the evening of 2 July, the German ships commenced their transit from Trondheim and Bogen Bay to the forward base in Altafjord. The concentration was concluded on 4 July, with the heavy cruiser Lützow and three destroyers sustaining damage from rock landings and being withdrawn from the operation. Following the refuelling of the German squadron under Admiral Otto Schneewind in the afternoon of 4 July, the squadron was prepared to embark on a sea voyage. However, due to the lack of information regarding the location of the convoy's long-range covering squadron, the order to commence the operation was postponed. Concurrently, British intelligence had received reports of German heavy ships leaving the Trondheim base, but had no precise information on their further whereabouts. Given the speed of the German ships, they could have overtaken the convoy by the late evening of 4 July, risking the complete destruction of the convoy itself, as well as the forces of direct protection and close cover. In view of this, the First Sea Lord (Chief of the Naval Staff) of Great Britain, Admiral Dudley Pound, ordered on the evening of 4 July that the convoy be scattered and that the close-cover cruiser group be recalled to the west.

From that point on, Operation Rösselsprung was pointless, since the task of destroying the ships in the convoy, which were travelling separately, could be done much more effectively by submarine and air attack (which was eventually done). However, the Germans did not have full information about the convoy's break-up and believed it had split into two groups. On the morning of 5 July, after a German reconnaissance plane had spotted a long-range convoy escort moving westwards and posing no threat at that distance, the German command decided to launch the operation. At 11:55 (Note: Hereinafter Moscow time is given.) on 5 July, the Tirpitz lifted anchor and the German squadron began to set sail.

== German squadron before the attack ==
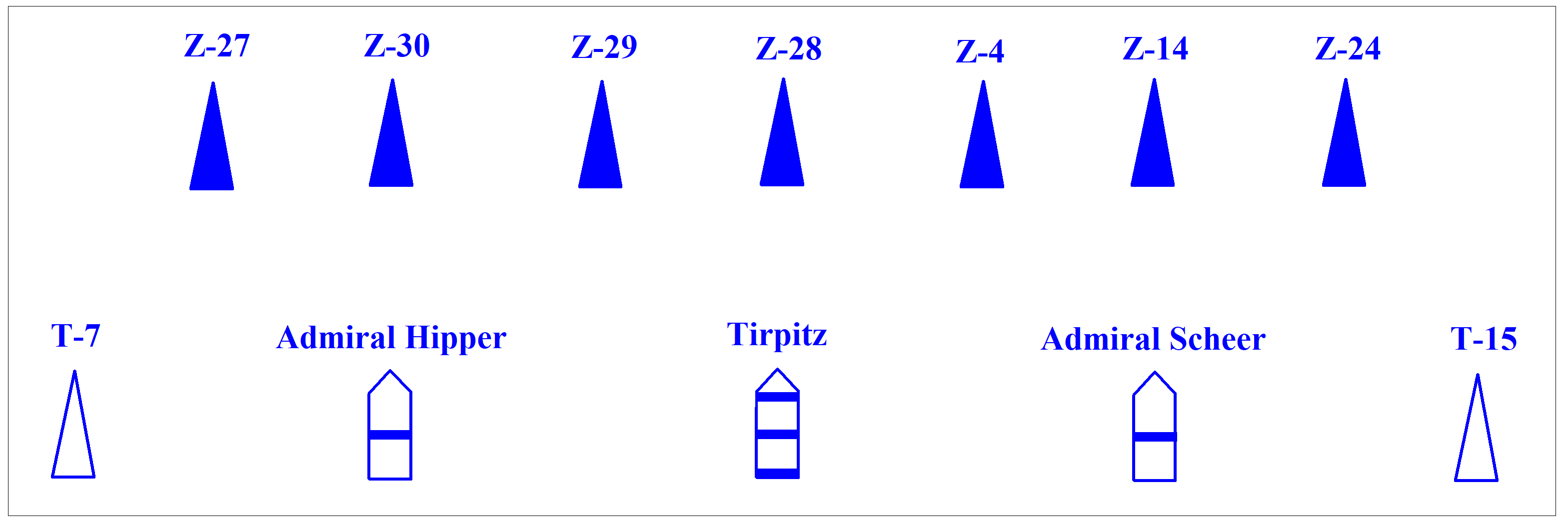
German squadron order after 16:46 on July 5, 1942

The German squadron that set sail consisted of the battleship Tirpitz, heavy cruisers Admiral Scheer and Admiral Hipper, destroyers Z4 Richard Beitzen, Z14 Friedrich Inn, Z24, Z27, Z28, Z29, Z30, and torpedo boats T7 and T15. Schneewind selected the fairway to the west of Rolvsøy Island as the optimal route for accessing the open sea, rather than the eastern skerry fairway prescribed by the higher command, which afforded access to the open sea in the vicinity of Porsangerfjorden. Schneewind's reasoning was that he considered the eastern channel to be more dangerous, both in terms of enemy submarines and the risk of mines being detonated. However, the route chosen by Schneewind took the German squadron into the area of the patrolling submarine K-21. At 16:06, the squadron commenced its transit across the open sea, increasing its speed to 24 knots (Note: The maximum speed of the squadron was constrained by the condition of the machines on the cruiser Admiral Scheer.) and reorganising its formation in accordance with the anti-submarine defence protocol. This entailed a frontline formation with torpedo boats positioned at the flanks, preceding the heavy ships. Such a formation forced the submarine attacking from a forward course (and attacking fast surface ships was only possible from a submarine's underwater position) to lower its periscope and increase its depth to avoid being detected and attacked by the destroyers; but after passing the destroyers, the submarine had no time to organise a successful attack on the protected heavy ships. An attempt by a submarine to evade the order had a similar result - it simply did not have enough time to get within torpedo range of the attacked ships, the squadron literally whizzed past the submarine. To reduce the risk of torpedoing the destroyers, at 16:46 Schneewind ordered them to move in a small zigzag. The heavy ships continued to move without zigzagging. Furthermore, the Ar 196 seaplane was launched from the battleship Tirpitz with the objective of searching for enemy submarines. The squadron proceeded on a course of 30° (north-northeast), with the intention of reaching a distance of 25 miles from the coast as expeditiously as possible, given that the risk of submarine attack was greatest in this area. The distance between the heavy ships was initially 2,000 metres, but at 16:47 it was increased to 3,000 metres.

== K-21 before the attack ==
In accordance with the operation to provide escort for the PQ-17 convoy, the Soviet Northern Fleet allocated four submarines to attack German heavy ships: K-2, K-21, K-22 and Shch-403. Of these, submarine K-21, commanded by Hero of the Soviet Union, Captain 2nd Rank Nikolai Lunin, was assigned position No. 2A, situated in proximity to the Norwegian coast and tasked with obstructing the fjord exits between the islands of Sørøya and Jelmsøya. By this time, Nikolay Lunin had accrued considerable experience as a submariner, having completed seven combat missions (five of which he commanded the Shch-421 and two the K-21). He claimed the destruction of eight enemy transports, although a post-war study of German documents revealed that only one ship, the 2975 grt displacement transport Konsul Schulte, had been sunk. By mid-1942, Lunin had developed his own tactical style, characterised by, among other things, active search for the enemy, maximum use of acoustic observation data, preference for firing from long and even extreme distances with full bow or stern salvos, poor use of the periscope after the initial detection of the target (the commander concentrated on observing only the selected target, which often led to the detection of only part of the enemy convoy or formation), excessive use of aft torpedo tubes, exaggerated assessment of the enemy's anti-submarine defence capabilities (which led to firing from long distances and frequent refusal to observe the results of attacks), careless attitude to facts and maximally optimistic assessment of the results of his torpedo attacks (all observations were interpreted solely to confirm success, and facts to the contrary were not taken into account.)

The submarine K-21 commenced its fifth combat cruise on 18 June 1942. The primary objective of the campaign was to detect and attack heavy enemy surface vessels. Consequently, four of the six torpedoes in the bow torpedo tubes were configured with a 5 m depth of travel setting, which ensured that deep-seated battleships and cruisers were hit in the vulnerable part of the hull below the armour belt. The remaining torpedoes (two in the bow torpedo tubes and four in the stern torpedo tubes) were set to a depth of 2 metres. On the morning of 19 June, the submarine was travelling in a surface position in low cloud conditions when it was attacked by an enemy aircraft. Two aerial bombs exploded approximately 30–40 metres from the boat. The concussion caused damage to the K-21, resulting in the inability to use the fast dive tank and equalisation tank No. 1. This limited the submarine's manoeuvrability in the underwater position. On 27 June, K-21 was subjected to a second attack by enemy aircraft. However, the bombs that were dropped near the board failed to detonate, limiting the damage to eight bullet holes in the light hull. On the night of 28 June, following the receipt of an order, K-21 proceeded to position No. 2A, where it conducted patrols over the following days, having no contact with the enemy until 5 July.

== The attack ==
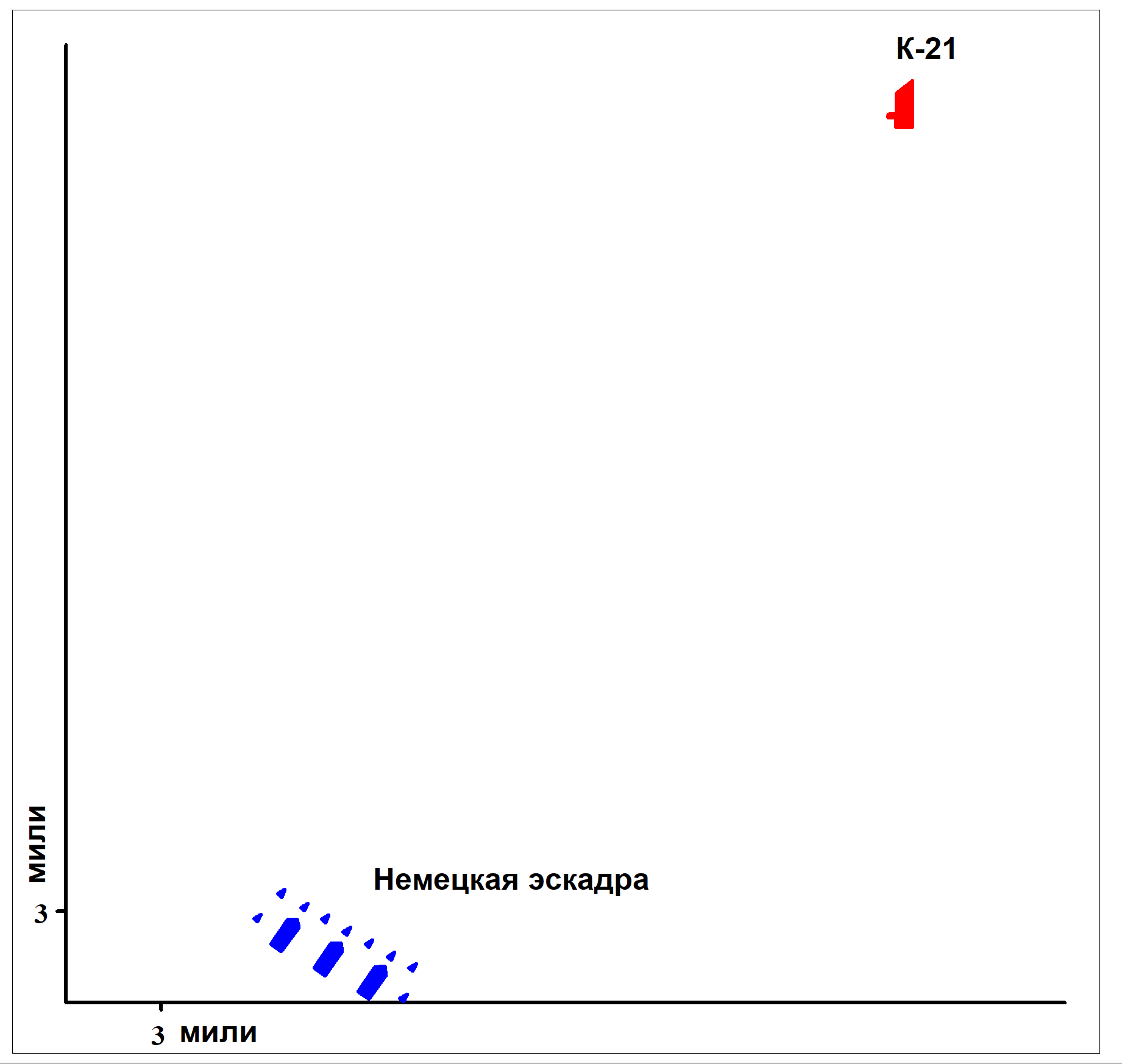
Mutual position of K-21 and the German squadron at the time of the first acoustic contact. Reconstruction

At 16:30, K-21 hydroacoustician A. Smetanin heard a noise, which he identified as the sound of ships' propellers. At that moment, the K-21 was in an underwater position at a depth of 20 metres and was sailing at a speed of 3 knots. The hydroacoustician reported that the target was located at a distance of 12 miles from the submarine, with a heading angle of 30° on the starboard side. The reconstruction presented by N. Skrynnikov and M. Morozov (hereinafter referred to as the reconstruction) indicates that the actual distance between the German squadron and K-21 at that moment was approximately 35 miles, with a course angle of 3°. This suggests that the German squadron proceeded directly towards K-21. The watch commander of K-21 at the time of the acoustic contact was Senior Mate F. Lukyanov, the boat commander was asleep in his cabin. At 16:40 K-21 surfaced under the periscope, but nothing could be seen on the horizon. At 17:00, the submarine altered its course in order to proceed directly towards the noise source. Concurrently, the periscope was elevated, through which an adversarial submarine, identified as a German U-boat, was observed approximately 4–5 miles away. This was in fact the upper masts of the German fleet, which, according to the reconstruction, were situated approximately 22 miles away. The capacity to observe vessels at such a considerable distance was a consequence of refraction over the surface of the sea. A torpedo attack was announced on the boat, and a command was issued to prepare torpedo tubes for firing. At approximately the same time, Lunin, who had been awakened by a messenger, entered K-21 control.

At 17:02, K-21 commenced a left turn, and at 17:10, it increased its speed to 5 knots, preparing to engage the enemy "submarine" with its stern torpedo tubes. At 17:12, Lunin altered the target identification, assuming that instead of a submarine, he was observing two torpedo boats in a ledge formation at a distance of 6–7 miles. He then proceeded to attack one of them, also utilising the stern torpedo tubes. In point of fact, Lunin continued to observe the tops of the masts of the German heavy ships, which, according to the reconstruction, were at that time approximately 17 miles away. At 17:18, the submarine commander finally correctly identified the target, estimating the distance to the German heavy ships to be 10–12 miles (14–15 miles according to the reconstruction).

At 17:02, the submarine deviates to the left, which results in her deviating from the course of the German ships. At 17:23, Lunin estimates the composition of the enemy squadron to be the battleship Tirpitz, the heavy cruiser Admiral Scheer, and eight torpedo boats. Additionally, he notes the presence of a seaplane Ar 196 over the squadron. The heavy cruiser Admiral Hipper is not identified until the end of the attack. The course of the German squadron as recorded in the K-21 logbook is erroneously depicted as 85° (east), rather than the true course of 30° (north-northeast). Such a gross error in determining the course of an experienced commander in conditions of excellent visibility is difficult to explain; the reconstruction concluded that it was most likely not a mistake, but a deliberate distortion of the facts by Lunin to present his actions in a more favourable light to the higher command.

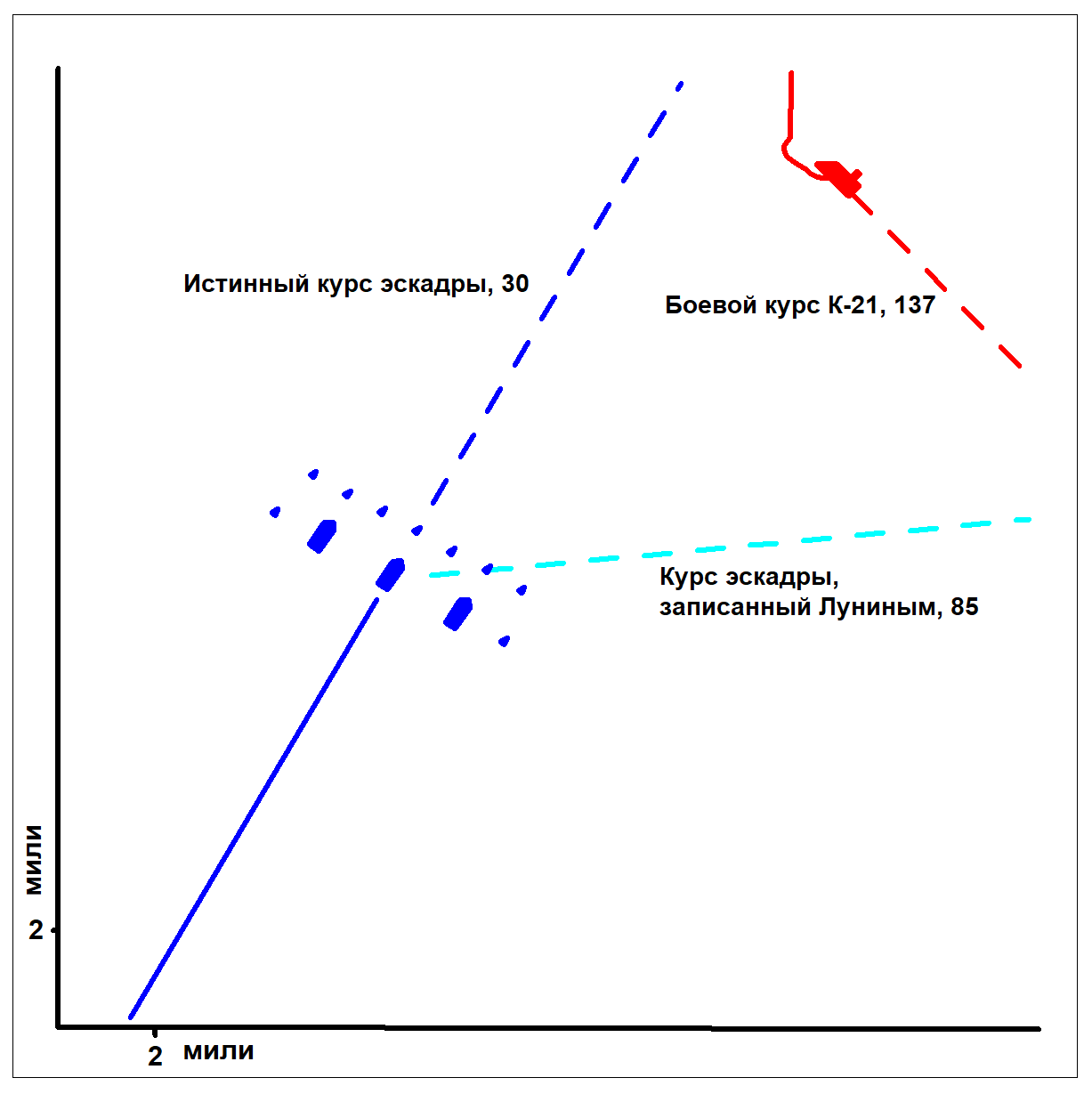
Mutual position of the K-21 and the German squadron at 17:25. Reconstruction

At 17:25, K-21 commenced an attack course, increasing speed to 6 knots. This was ordered by Lunin, who had previously instructed the submarine to put the rudder on the starboard side. Based on the true course of the German squadron, such a course would have allowed the submarine to attack the Admiral Scheer on a course of departure from the aft torpedo tubes. However, the entries in the K-21's logbook gave the impression that the submarine intended to attack the squadron from the bow torpedo tubes on a course of approach. Concurrently, the lids of the bow torpedo tubes (Nos. 1 and 2) were never opened, thereby confirming the intention to launch the attack with the stern torpedo tubes. The authors of the reconstruction have determined that this decision was erroneous. They contend that Lunin incorrectly determined the distance to the German squadron and laid on a course of departure instead of a course of rapprochement. As a result, the K-21 moved too far away from the course of the German squadron. It is notable that between 17:23 and 17:46, the K-21 watch log is devoid of any information regarding the target bearing, and there are no entries in the acoustic watch log between 17:23 and 17:33. The authors of the reconstruction posit that these data did not correspond to Lunin's ex post facto version of the attack and, therefore, were not included in the documents (completed after the attack). At 17:29, K-21 slightly corrected its course, changing it by 5°.

The attack prepared by Lunin from aft torpedo launchers was thwarted. However, at 17:35-17:37, the German squadron, maintaining the front line, began a right turn to a course of 90° – the general course to the east. This course was believed by Schneewind to lead the German ships to the convoy. The speed was reduced to 21 knots for the duration of the turn. This manoeuvre is reflected in numerous German documents, particularly in the combat logs of all German ships that were part of the squadron. The K-21's logbook offers a markedly disparate account, with Lunin stating that by 17:36, the German squadron had executed a 90-100° left turn, reorganising itself into a column. Due to the intricate manoeuvring of German ships during the turn, as well as the limited observation through the periscope, it can be assumed that Lunin may have lacked an accurate understanding of the situation.

At 17:38, the Admiral Scheer, which is in the process of turning, is on a course aimed directly at the submarine at a distance of approximately seven miles. At 17:40, the K-21 submerges, sharply turning the rudder to the starboard side and, by 17:46, setting a new course, rapidly approaching the enemy. Concurrently, the submarine's watch log reveals a discrepancy between the course of the Tirpitz and other German ships and the information provided in German documents. At the time in question, the German vessels were facing the submarine with their bow or left cheekbone and were moving in a front-to-east formation, rather than in a north-northwest-bound column as indicated in Lunin's records. Given the implausibility of such a gross error occurring at such a distance (approximately five miles) in conditions of good visibility, the authors of the reconstruction have concluded that Lunin's fictitious parameters of the German squadron are the most probable explanation. According to the reconstruction, Lunin intended to attack the Admiral Scheer, but made a mistake, considering the intermediate course of 60° taken by the heavy cruiser in the process of turning for the new general course.

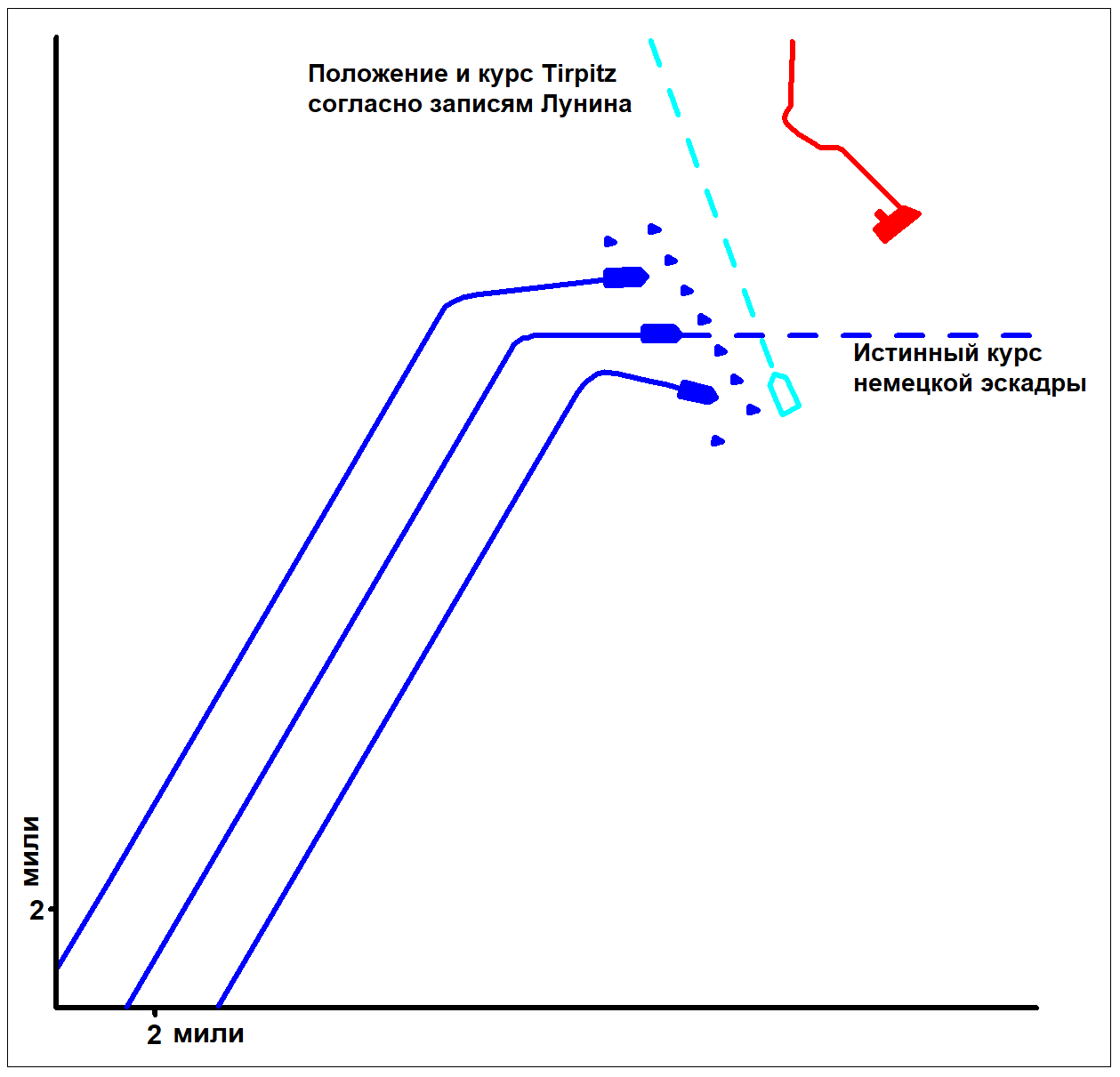
Mutual position of the K-21 and the German squadron at 17:46. Reconstruction

At 17:50, K-21 once again raised her periscope. By this time, the German squadron was in the final stages of the turn. The Admiral Scheer was observed to be positioned to the left of the submarine at a distance of 4.5 miles, while the Admiral Hipper was observed to be approaching K-21 from a distance of 3.5 miles. In silhouette, especially when viewed from the bow, this heavy cruiser was very similar to the battleship Tirpitz, and for this reason, as the authors of the reconstruction suggest, was mistaken for it by Lunin. To explain the observed position of the squadron, Lunin states in the log that at 17:50 the German squadron allegedly made a "sudden" turn to the right, quickly reorganising itself from a column to a front. Lunin promptly lowered the periscope, increased the diving depth to 20 metres and rotated the K-21 90° to the right in order to launch an attack with the aft torpedo tubes. Meanwhile, the German squadron had completed the 90° turn by 17:55 and increased speed to 24 knots.

At 17:57, according to the reconstruction, K-21 had missed the destroyers above her and was in a favourable position to attack the cruiser Admiral Hipper, which was only 0.7 miles away. Attacking the battleship Tirpitz was no longer a viable option, as the distance to it was 2.4 miles, which exceeded the maximum range of torpedoes, and continued to increase. However, an opportune moment for the salvo was missed. Lunin was reluctant to ascend to periscope depth in order to ascertain the situation and make a decision to launch torpedoes, given his proximity to the destroyer escort. Consequently, the anti-submarine formation of the German squadron was able to fulfil its task. Following 17:57, the distance between the K-21 and the Admiral Hipper began to increase rapidly, accompanied by a corresponding increase in the angle of the torpedo encounter. This resulted in the submarine and the squadron "running away" from each other.

At 18:00, the K-21 surfaced to periscope depth. According to the reconstruction, by this time the Admiral Hipper was at a distance of 1.6 miles and was actually showing the stern to the Soviet submarine commander. At the same time, the Tirpitz was at a distance of approximately three miles from the K-21, which created the illusion that it could be hit. In fact, the maximum range of K-21 torpedoes, which was 2.2 miles, rendered it impossible to hit the battleship. According to the recollections of an eyewitness of the attack, Lieutenant A. Kotov, the submarine commander expressed doubt as to the expediency of launching torpedoes:

Lunin - shoot, don't shoot? It's a long distance. And the XO: "Shoot, Comrade Commander, shoot!"

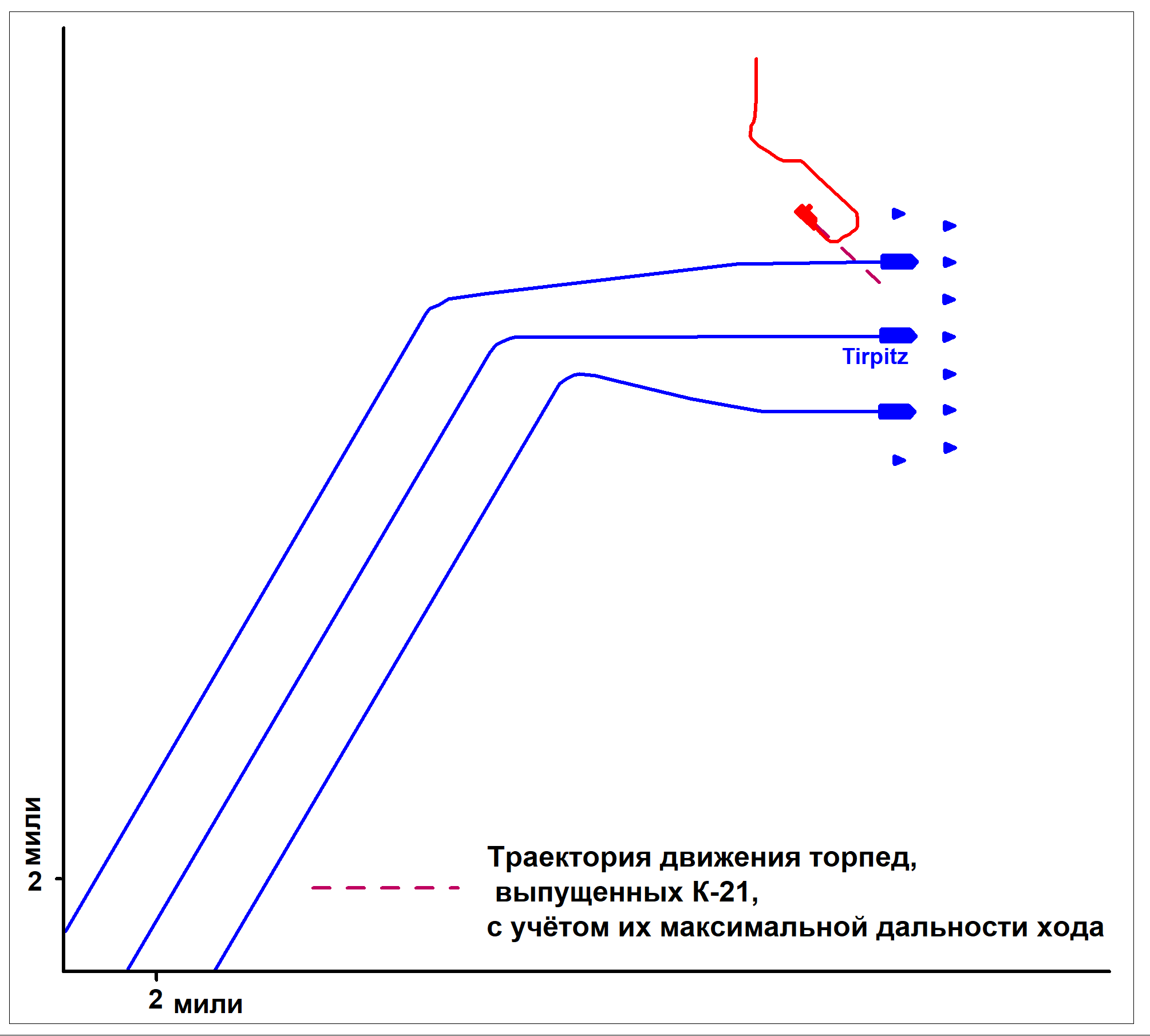
Mutual location of K-21 and German squadron at 18.01.30 (the moment of torpedo launch). Reconstruction

After a brief period of deliberation, Lunin reached a decision. At 18:01, he turned the boat to the left in order to provide the necessary angle of anticipation. At 18:01:30, he launched four torpedoes at four-second intervals from the stern torpedo tubes at the battleship Tirpitz. The watch log indicates that the distance between the K-21 and the battleship was estimated to be between 1.8 and 2 miles, which is close to the maximum range of the torpedoes. The reconstruction indicates that the distance between the submarines was 3.3 miles, which precluded the success of the attack. Upon launching the torpedoes, Lunin lowered the periscope and increased the submarine's sinking depth to 30 metres, subsequently returning it to its original course and leading away from the German squadron. The refusal to observe the results of the attack was argued by Lunin on the basis of a sharp turn of one of the destroyers towards the submarine, which is not confirmed by German documents. The authors of the reconstruction posit that this manoeuvre was a manifestation of reasonable caution. Following the launch of torpedoes, the probability of detection of the submarine, especially from aircraft, was increased. Conversely, Lunin realised the unlikelihood of success and saw no point in continuing observations through the periscope.

At 18:04, as indicated in the K-21's logbook, two minutes and 15 seconds after the torpedoes were launched, the sub heard two explosions. In response, K-21 slightly changed course and increased the diving depth to 40 meters. This was evidenced by the noise of destroyers sharply increased to the right and left of the submarine. Subsequently, between 18:08 and 18:10, K-21 continued to alter its course, leaning to the west. Concurrently, the logbook recorded the noise of destroyers in front and on the sides of the boat. The data regarding the noises emitted by the destroyers appears to be at odds with the findings of the K-21 acoustic watch log, which, as of 18 August, indicated only vague noises on the aft corners of the starboard side. These noises were reminiscent of the sound of a submarine passage. The German squadron did not record any explosions and did not search for the enemy submarine, as the attack was not detected. The German ships continued to move in the same direction, at the same speed and in the same formation as before. According to the reconstruction, the K-21 torpedoes crossed the Hipper's wake about 1.5 miles astern of the cruiser and sank.

== Actions of the K-21 and the German squadron after the attack ==
At 18:31 (i.e. half an hour after the attack), K-21 surfaced at periscope depth, observing the smoke and mast tops of the departing German squadron (the distance between the submarine and the German squadron had by this time reached 16 miles). At 18:31, 18:32, and 18:38, the submarine's watch log records the occurrence of muffled rolling explosions, each lasting approximately 20 seconds. The acoustic watch log indicates that two explosions were recorded at 18:25 and 18:27. At 19:05, K-21 once again surfaced at periscope depth. Having found no evidence of the attack, it rose to the surface and commenced transmitting a radiogram at 19:09. The exact text of the radiogram remains classified, but it can be reconstructed from records in other documents:

At 18.00 at W=71°25'N D=23°40'ost attacked enemy ships consisting of battleships "Tirpitz", "Scheer" and eight destroyers, heading for Nord-Ost. Went out to attack the LC "Tirpitz". Heard two explosions. The commander of the "K-21"

In this instance, both the trajectory of the German squadron and the coordinates of the point of attack were determined with a certain degree of inaccuracy. Having received confirmation of the receipt of the radiogram, the submarine submerged once more. The subsequent voyage of the submarine proceeded without incident, and on 9 July 1942, K-21 returned to its base.

The K-21 radiogram was decoded at the Northern Fleet Headquarters at 19:55 on 5 July. The content of the radiogram was immediately transmitted to the British military mission, which at 20:04 transmitted the corresponding radiogram to the Admiralty, as well as to the ships of the British fleet. Subsequently, a report on the enemy was transmitted by an unencrypted message "on the fleet" working on long wavelengths to a powerful radio station located in Cleethorpes. This message was received by both British ships and submarines, as well as by the German squadron.

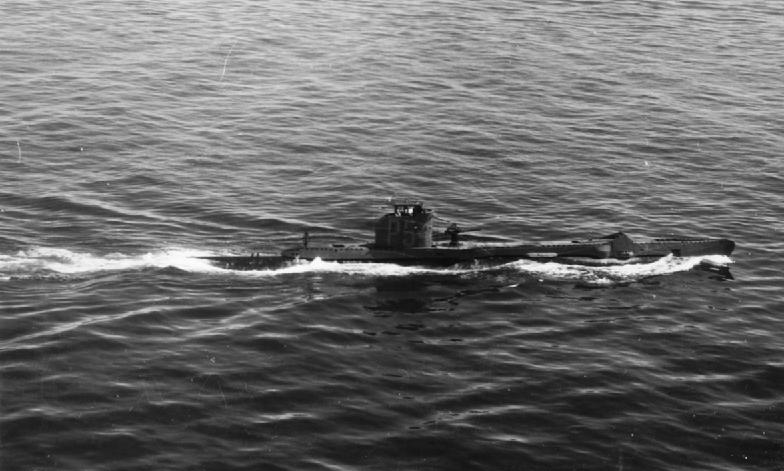
HMS Unshaken submarine

On 5 July at 19:16, the German squadron was detected by the crew of the Il-4 reconnaissance plane, under the command of Captain I. Y. Garbuz. However, the observations made by Captain Garbuz were not entirely accurate. He determined the composition of the German squadron to be 11 ships, without identifying their specific classes. Furthermore, he made an error in determining the coordinates and speed of the squadron, indicating that it was moving at a speed of 10 knots. The radiogram transmitted by the aircraft was decoded almost simultaneously with the K-21 radiogram. Its content was also communicated to the British mission and served as the basis for a new message transmitted by the Cleethorpes radio station. At approximately 20:24, the British submarine HMS Unshaken detected the Schniewinda squadron, identifying its composition as Tirpitz, Admiral Hipper and six destroyers, travelling at a speed of 22 knots. Due to the unfavorable mutual position of the submarine and the squadron, the commander of the Unshaken, C. E. Oxborough, was unable to launch an attack. Consequently, he transmitted a radiogram of enemy sightings shortly after 22:00.

Concurrently, the German fleet command conducted an assessment of the potential for continuing the operation. The receipt of reports from the radio station in Cleethorpes provided clear evidence of the squadron's detection, thereby increasing the probability of establishing a permanent surveillance. Concurrently, German air reconnaissance lost contact with the British long-range cover detachment, which included an aircraft carrier. This created the potential risk of the German squadron being intercepted. Finally, from submarines, aviation and radio intelligence, numerous reports were received indicating the disbanding of the convoy and the dispersal of its ships at great distances from each other. This made the continuation of the operation pointless. After a period of indecision, the commander of the Kriegsmarine, Grand Admiral E. Raeder, gave the order to cease the operation. At 22:51 on 5 July, the battleship Tirpitz commenced a change of direction, and at approximately 11:40 on 6 July, the German squadron arrived at the forward anchorage in Altafjord. Following the replenishment of fuel, the squadron proceeded to its permanent base in Bugen Bay, completing the transition at approximately 04:00 on 8 July. Further Tirpitz exercises were conducted in the Vestfjorden between 27 July and 31 July, 17 September and 21 September, 14 October and 15 October, 28 September and 1 October, 19 October and 22 October, and 23 October and 24 October. On 23 October and 24 October, the vessel passed from Bugen Bay to Trondheim.

== Evaluation of the results of the attack ==
=== Initial period (July–August 1942) ===
On 8 July 1942, a report was issued by the Sovinformburo, which stated that a Soviet submarine had attacked the Tirpitz, hitting it with two torpedoes and causing significant damage to the battleship. The following day, more detailed articles were published in the newspapers Pravda and Krasny Flot, in which the name of the boat commander was mentioned. It was stated that, due to damage to the battleship Tirpitz, the German squadron was forced to abandon the attack on the convoy and return to port. This information was also disseminated in the media of the anti-Hitler coalition countries, and foreign news agencies were officially given Lunin's photo.

On or before 30 July 1942, Lunin prepared a report on the results of the attack, in which he expressed his opinion:

Undoubtedly hit 2 torpedoes during the attack on the LC "Tirpitz" is reliable, which should be established by reconnaissance, but at the same time I admit the possibility that the lead destroyer, turned at the time of the shot on the countercourse with the battleship intercepted torpedoes on themselves, in favor of this assumption testify to the subsequent large explosions.

The conclusions drawn from the submarine brigade headquarters documents posit that one torpedo struck the battleship and another the destroyer, following the sinking of the latter. It is postulated that the explosions heard 20–30 minutes after the attack were the result of depth bombs detonating. Soviet intelligence also received information about a single torpedo hitting the stern of the battleship Tirpitz; Morozov and Skrynnikov note that Soviet intelligence reportedly had no agents in the area where the German battleship was based and received information through German patriots communicating with the local population. It is likely that the distorted information received was based on the damage caused by the landing on the rocks and subsequent repair of the heavy cruiser Lutzow.

By August 1942, scepticism prevailed in the Soviet Navy leadership that the attack had been unsuccessful or had resulted in minimal, quickly repaired damage to the German battleship. On 24 August 1942, an order was issued to award the K-21 crew combat decorations for the submarine's fifth and sixth combat tours, and Lunin and 16 other crew members were awarded the Order of the Red Banner of Battle, which was not among the highest honours. The proposal of the Northern Fleet Command to award the K-21 the rank of Guard was changed by the decision of the Navy Commissar N.G. Kuznetsov to the Order of the Red Banner of Battle, which was considered less prestigious; the K-21 never received the title of Guard. At the same time, the submarine was credited with the destruction of the destroyer Tirpitz (with its inclusion in the number of victories inscribed on the deckhouse of K-21), but was not included in the official lists of losses inflicted on the enemy.

By the afternoon of 6 July, the British naval command had already concluded that the K-21 raid was ineffective; later, the study of aerial reconnaissance data and the decoding of German communications intercepts reinforced this opinion, which was communicated to the Soviet side at its request.

=== Between the fall of 1942 and the early 1960s ===
In early 1943, the Submarine Department of the USSR People's Commissariat of the Navy prepared a methodological document analysing the actions of Soviet submarines. Lunin's actions during the attack on Tirpitz were criticised, and the result of the attack was described as a "minor combat success". The document was distributed to fleets, command authorities and naval training establishments.

Following the conclusion of the Second World War, a team of British specialists conducted an investigation into the hull of the battleship Tirpitz, which had been sunk by British aircraft in November 1944. A representative of the Shipbuilding Directorate of the USSR People's Commissariat of the Navy participated in this work at the invitation of the British side. The investigation revealed that no traces of repair work had been carried out to repair damage caused by torpedoes. Concurrently, the British provided the Soviets with an extract from the battleship's combat log, which made no mention of the K-21 attack. Nevertheless, the textbook for students and cadets of naval educational institutions, published in 1953–1954, reiterated the information that as a consequence of the attack, the Tirpitz was damaged and the destroyer was sunk.

In 1957, the French historian Cloade Ewan published an article in the magazine La Revue Maritime entitled "Operation of the German Navy against the convoy PQ-17." One of the sections of the article was devoted to the attack of the K-21. Ewan relied on German documents and his correspondence with the participants of the operation from the German side to reach the conclusion that the attack was unsuccessful. In the same year, the article was translated into Russian and subsequently entered the library of the Historical Department of the General Staff of the USSR Navy. In 1959, the military-historical work The Navy of the Soviet Union in the Great Patriotic War of 1941-1945, published under the "secret" cover, reached the conclusion that the attack of the K-21 ended in a miss, based on the analysis of the extract of the log of battleship combat operations and the examination of publications in the foreign press. At the same time in 1960, the first edition of the memoirs of Admiral Arseny Golovko, who commanded the Northern Fleet in 1942, was published. In this work, the attack was described in detail with reference to diary entries and claimed its success. Concurrently, the original diary entries of Golovko do not mention the K-21 attack. According to the memoirs of the admiral's relatives, the text of the memoirs was altered in preparation for printing without the author's consent.

=== Between the early 1960s and the early 1990s ===
Following the publication of Golovko's memoirs, a contradiction emerged within Soviet historiography between official sources intended for the elite and those intended for the masses. During the 1960s, there was no unified position, with various publications either citing the Sovinformburo report, mentioning the attack itself without assessing its result, or simply omitting any mention of the attack. In the 1966 publication by the Naval Academy teachers A. I. Kozlov and V. I. Kozlov and V. S. Shlomin, entitled The Northern Fleet, as well as in the 1969 textbook for higher naval schools, the authors asserted the ineffectiveness of the attack. The same conclusion was reached by the authors of the study Combat Activity of Submarines of the USSR Navy in the Great Patriotic War of 1941-1945, published in 1969 under the cover of secrecy.

In 1968, the English writer D. Irving's work The Defeat of the PQ-17 Convoy was published in English. It was subsequently translated into Russian and published in the USSR in 1971. In the Russian edition, the book was subjected to selective edits, with a particular focus on the removal of a fragment in which the author expressed a critical attitude towards the results of the K-21 attack. In the same year, 1971, the first edition of Admiral N. G. Kuznetsov's memoirs was published, in which the submarine attack was mentioned, but the author refrained from assessing its results.

V. S. Pikul's novel Requiem for Convoy PQ-17, the first edition of which was published in 1970, had a significant impact on the formation of public opinion on the discussed issue. The novel asserted the success of the attack and harshly criticised foreign historians, as well as suggesting that the combat log of the battleship Tirpitz had been falsified. Morozov and Skrynnikov posit that Pikul's novel gave rise to a kind of conspiracy current, whose adherents believe that the K-21 attack was successful and its denial is the result of a vast anti-Russian conspiracy. They further argue that Soviet official historiography since the mid-1970s has established the practice of mentioning the K-21 attack but not its result, under the influence of Pikul's novel. In 1991, the first part of K. Yuan's book, The Soviet Navy in the War, was published in Paris. In this work, the author attempted to reconstruct the scheme of the K-21 attack at the tactical level. However, due to the lack of access to Soviet archives, K. Yuan was constrained to rely on general data from open Soviet sources.

=== Between the early 1990s and the late 2010s ===
Following the dissolution of the USSR, Russian historiography initially continued the practice of Soviet historiography, including the K-21 attack without specifying its results. This information is presented in the three-volume edition Three Centuries of the Russian Navy 1696-1996. In 1997, Professor V. D. Dotsenko of the Naval Academy dedicated a separate chapter to the attack on K-21 in his work Myths and Legends of Russian Naval History, which was subsequently republished on multiple occasions. In this chapter, Professor Dotsenko noted several key facts regarding the attack, including the following: Despite the prevailing opinion that the attack on K-21 was unsuccessful, there is no evidence that the participants in the campaign, including members of the crew of the battleship Tirpitz, suffered any torpedo hits after returning to the base for repairs. He based this conclusion on the evidence presented. In 1999, A.V. Platonov, senior lecturer (later professor) at the Naval Academy, in his book Commanders of Soviet Submarines 1941-1945, also noted the failure of the attack and suggested that Lunin had either adjusted the distance of the torpedo launch or the timing of the explosions. The same year saw the publication of the book Lunin attacks the Tirpitz by K.M. Sergeev, who served on the K-21 from April 1943 to December 1944. In this edition, for the first time, extensive extracts from the log book of the K-21 and the recollections of eyewitnesses of the attack were published. The materials of the book were used in the 8-part TV series Convoy PQ-17 (K.M. Sergeev was one of the historical advisors of the series), released in 2004, which presented a version of the success of the K-21 attack.

In 2006, M. E. Morozov, Candidate of Historical Sciences, Head of the Department of the Institute of Military History of the Defence Ministry of the Russian Federation, published an appendix to the book Bismarck and Tirpitz Battleships by A. A. Malov and S. V. Patyanin. V. Patyanin's book Battleships Bismarck and Tirpitz contains an article devoted to the analysis of the K-21 attack. The author's analysis of the movement patterns of the Soviet submarine and German ships leads to the conclusion that the attack had no theoretical chance of success due to the excessive distance between the launching of the torpedoes and their maximum range of travel. In 2019, M. E. Morozov and N. R. Skrynnikov published a monograph on the attack, entitled The Unknown Attack of Commander Lunin. In this work, the authors analysed a large number of sources and performed a computer reconstruction of the attack. Their conclusions were as follows:

From our point of view, on July 5, 1942, the following happened in the Barents Sea: despite all the efforts and courage of the crew of the "K-21", due to the imperfection of equipment, insufficient training of sailors (first of all, the boat commander), as well as objective difficulties that arose during the attack of a fast, well-protected ship formation, the torpedoes fired by the submarine did not hit anything. Instead of analyzing the reasons for the failure, it was followed, as has happened many times in our recent past, by declaring it a major victory.

== Origin of explosions ==
The source of the detonations heard on K-21 remains uncertain. The German squadron did not conduct acoustic surveillance due to the ineffectiveness of such an operation when travelling at full speed, and no detonations were observed visually. German ships did not utilise depth charges. The calculations indicate that the torpedoes fired by K-21 could have reached the bottom (after which their detonation from impact with the rocky bottom was possible) at approximately 18:07-18:14. This is inconsistent with the recorded times of both the first two explosions at 18:04 and the subsequent rolling explosions at 18:25-18:27. Concurrently, there is a possibility that the torpedo launched from Torpedo Apparatus No. 8 could have reached the bottom much earlier, given that the submarine crew's report indicates that it was defective, leaking air.

Morozov and Skrynnikov posit that the explosions recorded at 18:04 were most likely the result of an auditory aberration by one of the sailors. However, they do not rule out the possibility that one of the torpedoes exploded when it hit the bottom. Additionally, Morozov and Skrynnikov examined Lunin's reports on previous attacks, noting that, in general, he reported the sounds of torpedoes exploding after the attacks. In the overwhelming majority of cases, the German side's documents not only failed to record any losses, but also failed to record the fact of the attack itself. The case of the attack on 31 March 1942 is illustrative. K-21, under the command of Lunin, fired six torpedoes at "the enemy transport of the type of German dry cargo ships "Cordoba" of 7400 tonns displacement" from a distance of 2.2 miles. The commander did not observe the result of the attack, but recorded two explosions after 2 minutes and 56 seconds, which served as a sufficient reason for the higher command to confirm the success. However, German documents deny the presence of any ships in the area at the time in question.

The origin of the rolling explosions recorded at 18:25 and 18:27 is also unclear. One hypothesis suggests that they could be explained by German naval sappers detonating drifting or landed sea mines on the Norwegian coast. Another hypothesis suggests that they could be explained by a German aircraft attacking an imaginary target (a submarine). However, neither of these hypotheses has been substantiated by documentary evidence.

== Bibliography ==
- Скрынников, Н.Р.; Морозов, М.Э. (2019). Неизвестная атака командира Лунина [Commander Lunin's unknown attack] (in Russian). Moscow: Абрис. ISBN 978-5-00111-243-3.
- Доценко, В.Д. (2002). Мифы и легенды Российского флота [Myths and legends of the Russian Navy] (in Russian). Saint Petersburg: Полигон. ISBN 5-89173-166-5.
- Сергеев, К.М. (2005). Лунин атакует "Тирпиц"! [Lunin is attacking the Tirpitz!] (in Russian). Moscow: Яуза, Эксмо. ISBN 5-699-09530-6.
- Платонов, А.В.; Лурье, В.М. (1999). Командиры советских подводных лодок 1941—1945 гг [Commanders of Soviet submarines 1941-1945.] (in Russian). Saint Petersburg: Цитадель, Галея-принт. ISBN 5-8172-0026-0.
- Головко, А.Г. (1984). Вместе с флотом [Along with the fleet.]. Военные мемуары (in Russian) (3 ed.). Moscow: Финансы и статистика. pp. 111–116.
