= Fyodor Vidyayev =

Soviet submarine commander (1912–1943)

Fyodor Alekseyevich Vidyaev
- Born: November 7, 1912; Shentala Samara Oblast, Russian Empire
- Died: July 1, 1943 (aged 30); Barents Sea
- Military career
- Allegiance: Soviet Union
- Branch: Soviet Navy
- Service years: 1932–1943
- Rank: Captain 2nd Rank
- Conflicts: World War II
- Awards: Order of the Red Banner (three times); Order of the British Empire (OBE)

Fyodor Alekseyevich Vidyayev (Russian: Фёдор Алексеевич Видяев, 1912-1943) was a Soviet Navy submarine commander during World War II. He was killed in action in 1943.

Vidayev was born in Samara Oblast, he was an ethnic Mordvin. He finished high school in Murmansk in 1930 and graduated with distinction from the M.V. Frunze Higher Naval School in 1937. He joined the Northern Fleet submarine division and started as a junior navigator on the submarine D-2. In 1938 he took part in the rescue of four researchers from a drifting ice station. He took part in the Soviet Finnish War of 1939–40 blockading Petsamo.

In 1941 he was second in command of the submarine Shch-421 serving under Nikolai Lunin. He was given command of this boat in 1942 when Lunin was given command of the new submarine K-21. Vidayev carried out twelve war patrols. After the loss of ShCh-421 (scuttled at sea after mine damage) he commanded the sister ship ShCh-422. His boat set out in July 1943 and never returned.

The town of Vidyayevo was named after him as was a Don-class submarine tender.
