= MV Explorer =

A number of motor vessels have been named Explorer, including -

- MV Explorer (1969), a Norwegian, Panamanian and Liberian-flagged cruise ship which sank off the coast of Antarctica in 2007.
- MV Explorer (2001), a passenger ship which has had several names and is now called Blue Dream Star.
- MS Explorer II, a cruise ship now called MV Minerva.

== See also ==
- Explorer (disambiguation) for other ships named "Explorer" or with "Explorer" in their name.
- HMS Explorer, two ships with this name.
- MS Explorer of the Seas, cruise ship
- SS Explorer, a steam trawler on the National Historic Ships register.
