= Xplorer =

Xplorer may refer to:

== Transport and vehicular ==
- New South Wales Xplorer, passenger train in Australia introduced in 1993
- Xplorer (New York Central Railroad train), New York Central Railroad passenger train in Ohio introduced in 1956
- Xplorer Motorhomes, builder of recreational vehicles
- Xplorer UltraFlight, aircraft manufacturer based in Cape Town, South Africa

== Other uses ==
- xplorer², Windows file manager
- Memphis Xplorers, professional gridiron arena football team based in Memphis, Tennessee, USA

== See also ==
- Explorer (disambiguation)
