= Explorer One =

Explorer One, Explorer I, Explorer 1, or variation, may refer to:

- Explorer 1 (1958), U.S. Army research satellite, the first successful U.S. satellite
- Explorer I (1934), high altitude balloon from National Geographic and the U.S. Army; an unsuccessful attempt at the manned altitude record
- Raven Explorer I, a U.S. autogyro kitplane
- Explorer 1 (Persian: کاوشگر ۱, romanized: Kavoshgar-1, an Iranian rocket, a variant of the Safir (rocket)
- Viga Tech Explorer I, a Chinese UAV drone
- Foday Explorer I, a Chinese SUV

== See also ==
- Explorer-1 Prime, a Montana State University cubesat
- Explorer-1 Prime Unit 2, a Montana State University cubesat
- Ocean Explorer I, the final name of the USS General W. P. Richardson (AP-118)
- RV Lake Explorer, predecessor to the Lake Explorer II survey ship
- Rolex Explorer, predecessor to the Rolex Explorer II wristwatch
- Explorer (disambiguation)
