= Douchan Gersi =

American filmmaker (1947–2015)

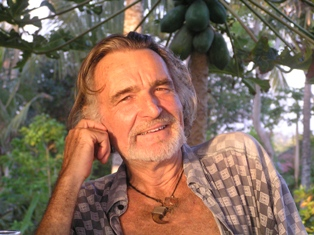
- Douchan Gersi
- Born: Dušan Gersi; March 4, 1947; Bratislava, Slovakia
- Died: December 5, 2015 (aged 68); Bali, Indonesia
- Years active: 1964–2004 (Note: Said to have spent 40 years.)

Douchan Gersi (1947–2015) was a Slovak-born, Belgium-raised, Bali-based adventurer, documentary filmmaker, author and actor, producer/star with actor James Coburn of Explore, a PBS mini-series. He is the author of numerous books including Faces in the Smoke: An Eyewitness Experience of Voodoo, Shamanism, Psychic Healing, and Other Amazing Human Powers and Explorer.

== Personal life ==
Gersi was born in Europe, and spent part of his life there. He then grew up in Africa.

At the age of 15, his 44-year-old father died of cancer. Before that, he had given Douchan a lecture on life, which would inspire him to "live to the fullest." Douchan eventually had children and grandchildren who would live with him in the Indian city of Madras from 2001 – 2003.

In 1988 Douchan was a contestant on the American game show Card Sharks hosted by Bob Eubanks.

== Career ==
In 1973, Gersi went to Tahiti. The year after, he went to central Kalimantan (the Indonesian part of Borneo) and Bali on an expedition. The expedition was sponsored by Leopold III of Belgium. In Bali, he stayed at a place rented by Marlon Brando near Ubud. In 1975, he claimed to have seen a tiger in East Kalimantan, and published two photographs to support his statement. The authenticity of these photographs were doubted by Lord Medway, 5th Earl of Cranbrook, in 1977, but accepted by Meijaard in 1999.

He has also worked as an actor for Hollywood and Bollywood. In India, he worked on documentaries of monarchs, particularly Indian maharajas and nawabs.

== Beliefs ==
Despite not following a recognized religion, or believing in the afterlife concepts of Heaven and Hell, he stated that he believed in God. He considered the Buddha, Jesus and Muhammad to have "brought new thoughts, and in some instances, the truth" to a lot of people. He also believed in having the "Three P's", that is passion, patience and perseverance.
