= Nikolai Lunin (admiral) =

Admiral in the Soviet Navy

- Born: 21 August 1907; Odessa, Russian Empire
- Died: 17 November 1970 (aged 63) Leningrad, Soviet Union
- Allegiance: Soviet Union
- Branch: Soviet Navy
- Service years: 1935–1962
- Rank: Rear Admiral
- Commands: Soviet submarine K21
- Conflicts: World War II
- Awards: Hero of the Soviet Union

Nikolay Aleksandrovich Lunin (Russian: Николай Александрович Лунин; 20 August 1907 – 17 November 1970) was an admiral in the Soviet Navy and a Hero of the Soviet Union.

== Early life and career ==
Lunin was born in Odessa, the son of a soldier. He studied at the Rostov-on-Don maritime college and joined the merchant marine serving aboard the tanker Azneft. He joined the Soviet Navy in 1935. He was arrested in the 1938 purge but released after 13 months. He was transferred to the submarine arm.

== World War II ==
In 1941, Lunin commanded the Shchuka-class submarine Shch-421 with Fyodor Vidyayev as his second in command. He carried out several successful patrols in this boat, sinking a German transport. In February 1942 he was given command of the new K-class submarine, K-21. K-21 made an unsuccessful attack on the German battleship Tirpitz on 5 July 1942 (Soviet propaganda claimed that the battleship was damaged). He subsequently carried out further patrols in Arctic waters and claimed 17 German transports. Confirmed are two ships 2975 BRT in total. In November 1943, he became commander of the Northern Fleet's submarine division. He was promoted to rear admiral in 1958.

After the war Lunin was involved in the Soviet exploration of the Arctic and Antarctic. Lunin retired in 1962 and died in 1970. He is buried in the Bogoslovskoe Cemetery in Saint Petersburg.

== Awards and honours ==
- Hero of the Soviet Union
- Order of Lenin – twice
- Order of Ushakov 2nd class
- Order of the Red Banner – triple
- Order of the Patriotic War 1st class
- Order of the Red Star
- Order of the British Empire

Streets have been named after him in Mariupol, Polyarny, Sevastopol and Odessa, and also schools in Murmansk and Rostov-on-Don.
