= USC&GS Explorer =

USC&GS Explorer may refer to more than one ship of the United States Coast and Geodetic Survey:

- USC&GS Explorer (1904), a survey ship in service from 1904 to 1918 and from 1919 to 1939
- USC&GS Explorer (OSS 28), an ocean survey ship (OSS) in commission from 1940 to 1968
