= HMS Explorer =

Two ships of the Royal Navy have been named HMS Explorer

- HMS Explorer (submarine) an experimental submarine launched in 1954 and scrapped in 1962
- HMS Explorer (P164) a small patrol craft commissioned in 1986, still in active service

== See also ==
- Royal Navy Explorer-class submarine
- MV Explorer, a number of motor vessels with this name
