= SS Atlantic =

SS Atlantic may refer to,

- SS Atlantic (1849), the Collins Line trans-Atlantic steamship.
- SS Atlantic (1870), a steamship that struck rocks and sank off Halifax, Nova Scotia in 1873, killing at least 535 people.
- SS Atlantic (1953), American passenger liner, that the Chinese magnate C.Y. Tung purchased in 1971 and converted into a university at sea under the name SS Universe.

== See also ==
- SS Atlantic Conveyor, requisitioned in the Falklands War and hit by Argentine missiles in 1982.
- SS Atlantic Causeway, requisitioned in the Falklands War.
- SS Atlantic Empress, a Greek oil tanker that in 1979 collided with another oil tanker in the Caribbean.
- SS Malolo, later renamed SS Atlantic.
- SS Atlantus
