= Explorer (video game) =

1986 video game

- Developer: RamJam Corporation
- Publisher: Electric Dreams
- Platform: ZX Spectrum
- Release: 1986
- Genre: simulation video game

Explorer is a 1986 simulation video game for the ZX Spectrum. It was developed by RamJam Corporation and published by Electric Dreams.

== Gameplay ==
The player explores the Emerald Planet, moving through different locations while searching for nine scattered fragments of a crashed spacecraft; to locate these pieces, the player uses tools such as a jetpack, radio beacon, compass, radio direction finder and laser pulse site, sending out radio signals to obtain bearings and ranges, placing beacons for later triangulation, traveling on foot or flying over terrain, occasionally encountering slow-moving flying bugs that can be shot, stepping into time‑and‑space paradox portals that transport the player to new areas, and ultimately retrieving fragments.

== Development ==
Explorer was programmed by Graham Relf, with graphics created by Simon Dunstan of the RamJam Corporation. The game employs procedural terrain-generation techniques that Relf had originally developed for The Forest (1982). Although the environment was designed to appear expansive, its terrain repeated after 65,536 metres because the game used 16-bit coordinates. Relf later acknowledged that he had concentrated more on developing programming techniques and algorithms than on gameplay.

== Reception ==
Reception

Review scores
Publication	Score
Aktueller Software Markt	1
Amstrad Action	19%
Commodore User	3
Zzap!64	13%
Jeux & Stratégie	2/5

Bill Scolding for Commodore User said that its gameplay is "wonderfully tedious", disliked its sound design, and noted the lack of graphical variety. Amstrad Action criticized the game's price. Zzap!64 said it had "not one single redeeming feature to write home about." Aktueller Software Markt gave the game a 1 overall. Jeux & Stratégie rated the game 2 out of 5.

Crash awarded the ZX Spectrum version 32%, praising aspects of its visual presentation and enormous game world while criticising the repetitive environments and lack of compelling gameplay.
