= Explore (TV series) =

Explore was a 1980s PBS TV show based upon the film footage filmed by explorer Douchan Gersi over the previous 20 years. The show was hosted by popular actor James Coburn.

== Series Episodes ==
- Once Upon A Time In Afghanistan (Afghanistan)
- In The Foot Steps Of Genghis Khan (Afghanistan)
- Land of the Living Gods
- Kingdom Beneath The Sky
- Lost Road To Nubia (Ethiopia)
- Bodies of Art, Bodies of Pandora
- Sanctuaries of Stone (Ethiopia)
- Land of Sheba (Ethiopia)
- Orphans of the Sun
- Magic Healing, Magic Death
- Wolves of Freedom
- Puppets of God
- And The Gods Moved to Taiwan
- Between Gods & Men
- Journal from India
- In The Wheels Of Karma
- the Last Empire of Sailing
- Festival of Tears
- Dancers of Evil (Sri Lanka)
- Tooth of Buddha (Sri Lanka)
- Blue Men of the Sahara
- From Timbuktu To The Stars (Burkina Faso)
- Kaaba Center of the Universe
- Bandits, Pirates, Flying Carpets
- Jungles of Borneo (Indonesia)
- Headhunters of Borneo (Indonesia)
