= Microsoft Explorer =

Microsoft Explorer may refer to the following products by Microsoft:

- Internet Explorer, a web browser
- File Explorer, officially called Windows Explorer, a file manager system
