= Soviet submarine Shch-421 =

- Shch-421 was of X series.

History

Soviet Union
- Name: Shch-421
- Laid down: 20 November 1934
- Launched: 12 May 1935
- Commissioned: 5 December 1937
- Fate: Scuttled on sea on 9 April 1942

General characteristics
- Class & type: Shchuka-class submarine, Type X
- Displacement: 577 tons surfaced; 704 tons submerged
- Length: 57.00 m (187 ft 0 in)
- Beam: 6.20 m (20 ft 4 in)
- Draught: 3.78 m (12 ft 5 in)
- Propulsion: 2 shaft diesel electric, 1,020 kW (1,370 bhp) diesel, 600 kW (800 bhp) electric
- Speed: 12.5 knots (23.2 km/h; 14.4 mph) on the surface; 6.3 knots (11.7 km/h; 7.2 mph) submerged
- Range: 6,000 nautical miles (11,000 km; 6,900 mi) at 8 knots (15 km/h; 9.2 mph)
- Test depth: 91 m (300 ft)
- Complement: 38
- Armament: 4 × bow torpedo tubes; 2 × stern torpedo tubes; (10 torpedoes); 2 × 45 mm (1.8 in) semi-automatic guns

Shch-421 was a Shchuka-class submarine of the Soviet Navy. She served in the Northern Fleet during World War II. She was led by commander Nikolai Lunin, before he was replaced by his second-in-command Fyodor Vidyayev.

== Service history ==
The submarine operated in the Northern Fleet and made torpedo attacks during 1941 and 1942, missing multiple targets and sinking one. On 19 February 1942, she ran aground in Skorbeevskaya Bay. She was refloated on 6 March and taken in to Polyarny for repairs. On 8 April 1942 the submarine suffered heavy damage in a minefield: with no more power and close to enemy shores, the crew built a sail out of the canvas cover and managed to move away from the dangerous area. ShCh-421 was then found by K-22. All crew was taken onboard K-22 and the crippled submarine was sunk with a torpedo.

Ships sunk by Shch-421
Date	Ship	Flag	Tonnage	Notes
5 February 1942	Konsul Schulte	(Nazi Germany)	2,975 GRT	freighter(torpedo)
Total:			2,975 GRT	
