= Dora the Explorer (disambiguation) =

Dora the Explorer is an American media franchise.

Dora the Explorer may also refer to:

- Dora the Explorer (TV series), animated children's TV series
- Dora the Explorer: Journey to the Purple Planet, a 2005 video game
- "Dora the Explora", a song by Pink Guy from the 2017 album Pink Season
- "Dora the Explora!", an episode of TV series Backpackers

== See also ==
- Dora and the Lost City of Gold, a 2019 film
- "Dora the Female Explorer", a song by Stackridge from the 1971 album Stackridge
