= The Northwest Explorer =

Weekly newspaper in Tucson, Arizona

Explorer Newspaper
- Type: Weekly newspaper
- Format: Tabloid
- Owner(s): Times Media Group
- Publisher: Jason Joseph
- Founded: 1993; 32 years ago
- Language: English
- Headquarters: 7225 N. Mona Lisa Road, #125; Tucson, AZ 85741; United States
- Circulation: 30,381 (as of 2020)
- Price: Free
- Website: explorernews.com

The Explorer Newspaper is a weekly newspaper in Tucson, Arizona, United States.

Its coverage area includes the towns of Oro Valley and Marana and the communities of Catalina Foothills, Casas Adobes, Catalina, SaddleBrooke, Tortolita, Oracle, along with neighborhoods in the City of Tucson and Pima County.

It is the 9th largest newspaper in Arizona, with a circulation of 47,475. In 2007, it was sold to Thirteenth Street Media. It became part of 10/13 Communications, owner of the East Valley Tribune, in 2010. It was sold to Times Media Group in 2021.
