= SS Explorer =

1955 research vessel in Edinburgh

Coordinates: 55°58′42.9″N 3°09′40.67″W

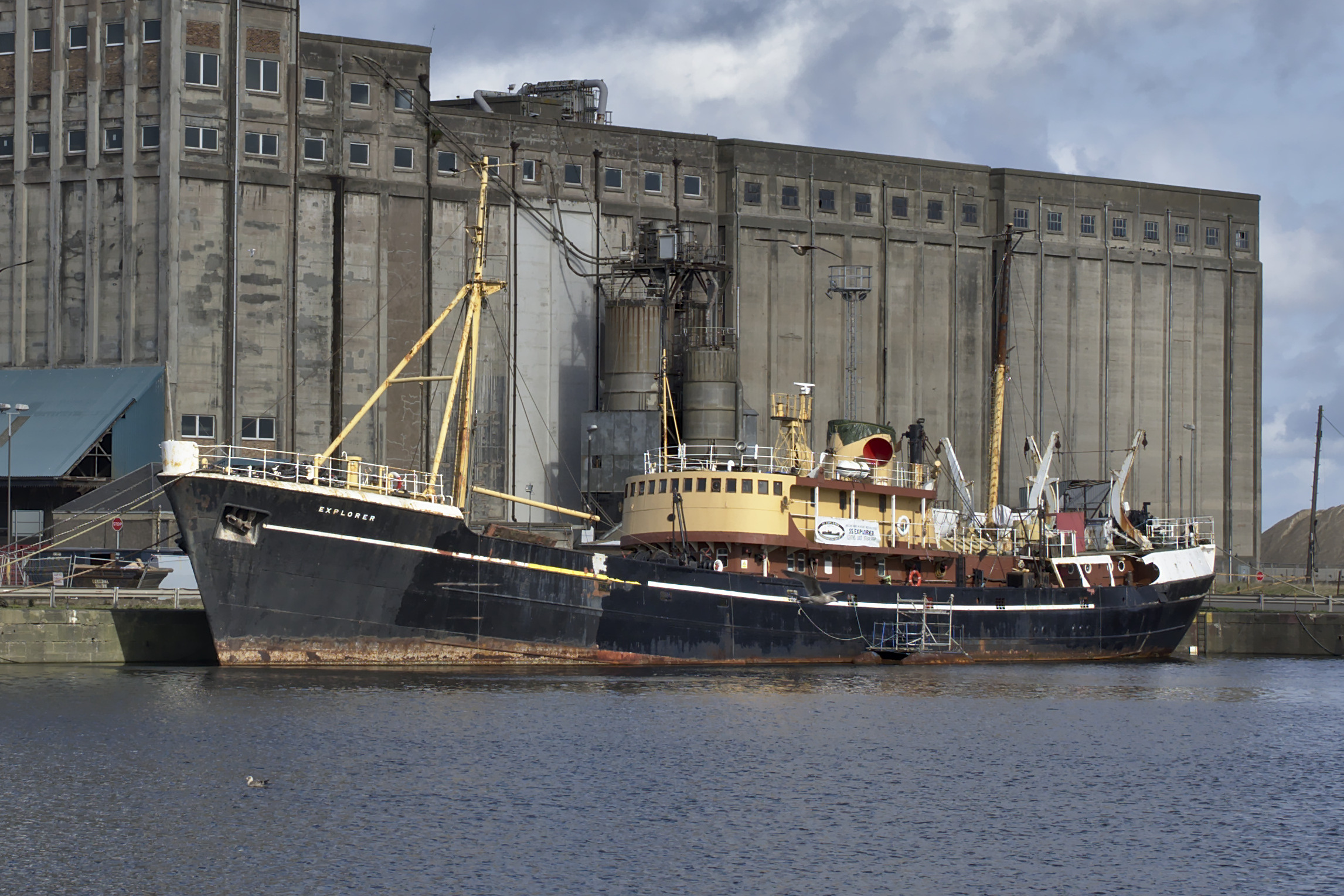
- SS Explorer at Leith in 2018

History

United Kingdom
- Name: SS Explorer
- Owner: Scottish Home Department
- Operator: Department of Agriculture & Fisheries for Scotland
- Port of registry: Leith
- Ordered: 1954
- Builder: Alexander Hall & Co. Ltd., Aberdeen
- Yard number: 747
- Launched: 21 June 1955
- Sponsored by: Lady Rachel Stuart
- In service: 1955
- Out of service: 1984
- Home port: Leith
- Identification: Official number: 303098
- Status: Museum ship

General characteristics
- Type: Fisheries Research Trawler
- Tonnage: 862 GT
- Length: 202 ft 9 in (61.80 m)
- Beam: 32 ft 9 in (9.98 m)
- Depth: 14 ft 2 in (4.32 m)
- Ice class: Lloyds 100 A1
- Propulsion: 1,000 ihp (746 kW) triple expansion steam engine
- Range: 8,000 nmi (15,000 km; 9,200 mi)
- Boats & landing craft carried: 2 × 24 ft (7.3 m) open aluminium lifeboats
- Crew: 38

SS Explorer is one of the last surviving sea-going steam trawlers and is registered to Leith, the port of Edinburgh. She has been placed on the National Historic Ships Register and the SS Explorer Preservation Society is currently restoring her in the Edinburgh Dock, Leith.

== Ship history ==
The FRS Explorer was launched on 21 June 1955 by Lady Rachel Stuart, wife of the Secretary of State for Scotland. Explorer was built by Messrs Alexander Hall & Co., Aberdeen, for the Scottish Home Department; to replace a 1917 built vessel of the same name. The Fishery Research Ship Explorer entered service in 1956 and was operated by the Marine Laboratory in Aberdeen. The role of the Explorer was to investigate fish breeding and feeding grounds so as to establish fishing levels and species types for the British market. In addition pollution and fish diseases that might adversely affect catches were monitored. The classic lines of a Deep Sea Beam Trawler were well suited to working in the traditional fishing grounds, and extra strengthening of the hull prepared her also for service in the Arctic waters off Greenland and Iceland, and the Barents and White Seas north of Russia.

From a technological standpoint the vessel represents the zenith of triple-expansion steam technology, which is combined with the very best of Scottish shipbuilding and innovation at a time when shipyards were moving away from traditional methods. The SS Explorer was built using riveted steel to ice-strength classification, but fitted with an aluminium superstructure, and although her main engine was a tried and tested design, a pioneering hybrid diesel-electric power system was installed to power her auxiliaries. SS Explorer also boasted one of the first onboard computers for a vessel of her type, something now commonplace along with diesel-electric hybrid power.

In 1984 the first service life of SS Explorer came to an end and she was sold for disposal. The Aberdeen Maritime Museum visited the ship to purchase the engine for exhibition ashore due to its historical importance as it had been the last built in Aberdeen. They were so impressed with the whole vessel though that it was bought complete and towed to the Cromarty Firth while a berth could be negotiated in the city to create a floating heritage attraction. Ten years passed without the museum being able to secure one, so a decision was taken to sell the vessel for scrap. This led to public outcry and the formation of "The SS Explorer Preservation Society" which aimed to rescue Explorer and preserve it for future generations.

Thanks to charitable donations and fundraising, the society was able to purchase the vessel from the ship breakers almost intact. Initial preservation work began while the ship was re-anchored once again in the Cromarty Firth but a secure berth was required. Wildlife, vandals and the harsh weather were taking their toll. In 1996 following an insurance payout as the result of a collision between SS Explorer and an offshore oil support vessel, the Society brought her home to Leith, her port of registry, for restoration.

Explorer was added to the National Register of Historic Vessels in 1996.
