= Soviet submarine K-21 =

K-class submarine of the Soviet Navy during World War II

Coordinates: 69.0810624°N 33.4329968°E

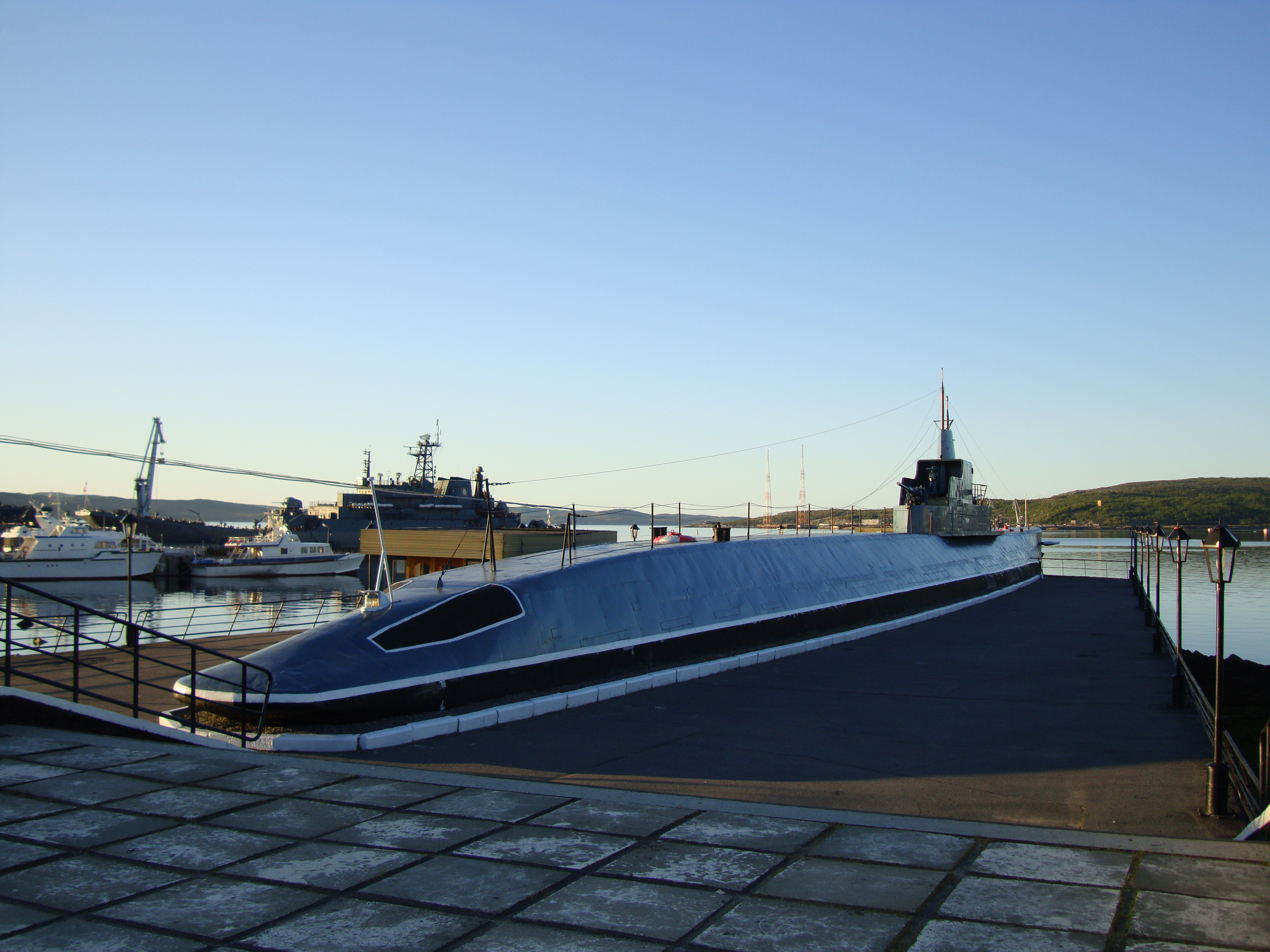
- K-21 as a museum ship displayed at Severomorsk Courage Square, Murmansk, Russia

History

Soviet Union
- Name: K-21
- Laid down: 10 December 1937
- Launched: 16 August 1939
- Commissioned: 30 November 1940
- Status: Museum ship in Murmansk since 1982.

General characteristics
- Displacement: 1490 tons surfaced; 2600 tons submerged
- Length: 97.65 m
- Beam: 7.4m
- Draft: 4.51m
- Propulsion: 2-shaft diesel electric, 8400-hp diesel, 2400-hp electric
- Speed: surface – up to 22.5 knots; submerged – 10 knots
- Range: 14,000 nm at 11 knots
- Test depth: 230 ft (70 m)
- Complement: 67 (10 officers)
- Armament: 6 × bow torpedo tubes; 2 × stern torpedo tubes; 2 × external stern torpedo tubes(24 torpedoes); 2 × 100 mm guns, 2 – 45 mm guns, 20 mines

Service record
- Part of: Northern Fleet

Soviet submarine K-21 is a K-class submarine of the Soviet Navy during World War II.

== Design and description ==
Despite the unsuccessful Pravda class built in the early 1930s, the Soviet Navy still dreamed of cruiser submarines capable of attacking enemy ships far from Soviet territory. In 1936 it received approval to build them with the addition of minelaying capability (Project 41). The boats displaced 1,490 metric tons (1,470 long tons) surfaced and 2,104 t (2,071 long tons) submerged. They had an overall length of 97.7 meters (321 ft), a beam of 7.4 meters (24 ft 3 in), and a draft of 4.5 meters (15 ft) at full load. The boats had a maximum operating depth of 80 m (260 ft). Their crew numbered 66 officers and crewmen.

For surface running, the K-class boats were powered by a pair of 9DKR diesel engines, one per propeller shaft. The engines produced a total of 8,400 metric horsepower (6,178 kW), enough to give them a speed of 21 knots (39 km/h; 24 mph). When submerged each shaft was driven by a PG11 1,200-metric-horsepower (883 kW) electric motor for 10.3 knots (19.1 km/h; 11.9 mph). The boats had a surface endurance of 7,500 nautical miles (13,900 km; 8,600 mi) at 10.3 knots (19.1 km/h; 11.9 mph) and 176 nmi (326 km; 203 mi) at 3.1 knots (5.7 km/h; 3.6 mph) submerged.

They were armed with six 533-millimeter (21 in) torpedo tubes in the bow and four were in the stern, two internal and two external. They carried a dozen reloads. A dual-purpose minelaying/ballast tank was located under the conning tower that housed 20 chutes for EP-36 mines which also served as outlets for the ballast tank's Kingston valves. This arrangement proved problematic as this was the location of the greatest structural loads in the hull and the mines were sometimes pinched in the chutes as the hull flexed. Another issue was that the chutes would sometimes jam when debris was drawn in with ballast water. The boats were also equipped with a pair of 100-millimeter (3.9 in) B-24PL deck guns fore and aft on the conning tower and a pair of 45-millimeter (2 in) 21-K guns above them.

== Construction and career ==
The boat was laid down on 10 December 1937 in Leningrad and launched on 16 August 1939. On 3 February 1941, it was commissioned as part of the Baltic Fleet under the command of Nikolai Lunin. On 17 September 1941, it was transferred to the Northern Fleet.

On its first war patrol, K-21 laid 11 mines in the Strait of Best-Sung. On the morning of 27 November 1941, one of the mines struck and sank the Norwegian transport Bessheim. Between 9 November 1941 and 31 March 1942, K-21 unsuccessfully engaged three merchant ships and one German auxiliary patrol vessel. On 21 January 1942, Norwegian fishing boat F-223N Ingøy was sunk by gunfire from K-21.

=== Attack on Tirpitz ===
On 5 July 1942, K-21 was in the vicinity of the Island of Ingay when she spotted the German battleship Tirpitz which was en route to intercept Convoy PQ 17 which was traveling from Iceland to Murmansk. However this mission was unsuccessful as the Tirpitz turned away. The convoy itself scattered upon hearing words of Tirpitz's imminent arrival, and most of the convoy's merchant ships were picked off by U-boats and the Luftwaffe.

On 27 June 1942, the K-21 received an order to take up a combat position to cover Convoy PQ-17. Later, the submarine received a radiogram telling that a German squadron consisting of the battleship Tirpitz, the heavy cruiser Admiral Scheer, and several destroyers were moving to intercept the PQ-17 convoy. K-21 began to search for the enemy squadron. On 5 July, at 4:33 pm, noise of approaching propellers was heard. The squadron was maneuvering in a zigzag pattern. The first ships to be seen were destroyers of the 1936 class, and they covered Tirpitz and the cruiser Admiral Scheer from possible attacks from submarines. The commander of K-21 decided to attack. K-21 bypassed the destroyers' protective barrier and went inside the squadron. Having approached to a distance of almost 13,000 feet the submarine fired a four torpedo spread from stern torpedo tubes towards the Tirpitz. Acoustics and crew members in the compartments of the submarine heard two explosions however, after the war, historians in German documents did not find evidence of torpedoes making contact with the battleship; the Germans did not even take notice of the attack. Historian M.E. Morozov put forward a hypothesis about the impossibility of torpedoes hitting the battleship, and he explained the origin of the explosions saying that the torpedoes detonated early. There are no references to Lunin's attack in the Tirpitz documents of the event. K-21 sank four small Norwegian motor boats via gunfire on 12 February 1943 at Lopphavet. On 22 April 1943, the German merchant ship Duna was sunk by a mine laid by K-21 on 18 February 1943. In May 1945, the boat was repaired.

== Postwar ==
October 1948, K-21 made the first Soviet submarine voyage off the coast of the United States. From 6 to 14 April 1949 the boat took part in oceanographic work in the area of the Novaya Zemlya archipelago.

After withdrawal from service, for about 20 years she served as a training ship.

In the spring of 1981, she was moved to the city of Polyarny, Murmansk Oblast to be converted into a museum ship. After reworking three compartments for the exposition (the other 4 remained virtually unchanged) was put on a pedestal (immersed in water at high tide) as a museum in Severomorsk, Russia. The museum was opened in 1983. In the late 1990s, the boat underwent some general repairs. From 2008 to 2009, the museum was renovated.

== Awards and achievements ==
On 23 October 1942, the K-21 submarine was awarded the Order of the Red Banner.

== Summary of raiding history ==
Ships sunk by K-21
Date	Ship	Flag	Tonnage	Notes
21 November 1941	Bessheim	(Norway)	1,774 GRT	Freighter (mine)
21 January 1942	Ingøy	(Norway)	15 GRT	Fishing boat (gunfire)
9 July 1942	UJ-1110	(Nazi Germany)	527 GRT	submarine chaser (mine)(also claimed by K-3)
12 February 1943	unknown name	(Norway)	(small)	fishing boat (gunfire)
12 February 1943	unknown name	(Norway)	(small)	fishing boat (gunfire)
12 February 1943	unknown name	(Norway)	(small)	fishing boat (gunfire)
12 February 1943	unknown name	(Norway)	(small)	fishing boat (gunfire)
12 April 1943	unknown name	(Norway)	(small)	fishing boat (gunfire)
12 April 1943	unknown name	(Norway)	(small)	fishing boat (gunfire)
12 April 1943	unknown name	(Norway)	(small)	fishing boat (gunfire)
12 April 1943	unknown name	(Norway)	(small)	fishing boat (gunfire)
22 April 1943	Duna	(Nazi Germany)	1,926 GRT	Freighter (mine)
14 September 1943	Frei	(Norway)	40 GRT	Fishing boat (gunfire)
Total:			4,282 GRT	

On 14 September 1943 other three small Norwegian fishing boats (Havatta, Baren and Eyshteyn) were attacked with gunfire but escaped despite damage.

== Bibliography ==
- Budzbon, Przemysław; Radziemski, Jan & Twardowski, Marek (2022). Warships of the Soviet Fleets 1939–1945. Vol. I: Major Combatants. Annapolis, Maryland: Naval Institute Press. ISBN 978-1-68247-877-6.
- Polmar, Norman & Noot, Jurrien (1991). Submarines of the Russian and Soviet Navies, 1718–1990. Annapolis, Maryland: Naval Institute Press. ISBN 0-87021-570-1.
- Rohwer, Jürgen (2005). Chronology of the War at Sea 1939–1945: The Naval History of World War Two (Third Revised ed.). Annapolis, Maryland: Naval Institute Press. ISBN 1-59114-119-2.

=== Further reading ===
- Сергеев Константин Михайлович. Лунин атакует "Тирпиц"! — СПб.: ГУП СПМБМ "Малахит", 1999. — 232 с. — (Вестник "Подводное кораблестроение. Прошлое, настоящее, будущее". Выпуск No. 13). — 800 экз.
- Ivo Pejčoch, Zdeněk Novák, Tomáš Hájek. Válečné lodě 4. Naše vojsko (1993). ISBN 8020603573.
- ПЛ ТИПА "К" (КРЕЙСЕРСКАЯ) серии XIV
