= Broome v Cassell & Co Ltd =

English libel case in 1970

Broome v Cassell & Co Ltd was an English libel case in 1970 which raised important legal issues concerning exemplary damages and the role of precedents in English law. It is also known for the involvement of the controversial writer David Irving.

Captain Jack Broome, a distinguished retired Royal Navy officer, sued Cassell Ltd and David Irving for libel for publishing a book by Irving on the destruction of Convoy PQ 17 in 1942. The book alleged that the destruction of the convoy was in large part due to Broome's conduct, even though Broome's superiors had absolved him of any blame at the time. After a three-week trial in the High Court, a jury awarded Broome £40,000 in damages, including £25,000 in exemplary damages (also known as punitive damages), the highest award for libel made in England up to that time.

The defendants appealed to the Court of Appeal in 1971 against the size of the jury's award. The Court of Appeal upheld the award, but also used the opportunity to criticise the 1964 House of Lords decision Rookes v Barnard, which severely limited the circumstances under which exemplary damages could be awarded. Arguing that the Lords' decision had been made per incuriam, Lord Denning, the Master of the Rolls, suggested that trial judges should disregard Rookes v Barnard and direct juries in accordance with the law as understood previously. On a further appeal, the House of Lords in 1972 also upheld the jury award, but the Lord Chancellor, Lord Hailsham of St Marylebone severely rebuked the Court of Appeal for directing judges of first instance to ignore Rookes v Barnard, which he considered as being incompatible with the hierarchical system of English courts.

Lord Hailsham's speech in Broome v Cassell is cited today in relation to the hierarchical nature of the English legal system and for the lower courts' duty in following the decision of higher courts. The parts of Rookes v Barnard concerning exemplary damages remains good law, although they have been rejected in most leading Commonwealth jurisdictions. Irving continued to provoke controversy, later becoming a prominent Holocaust denier. He was later involved in Irving v Penguin Books Ltd, another high-profile libel suit.

== Background ==
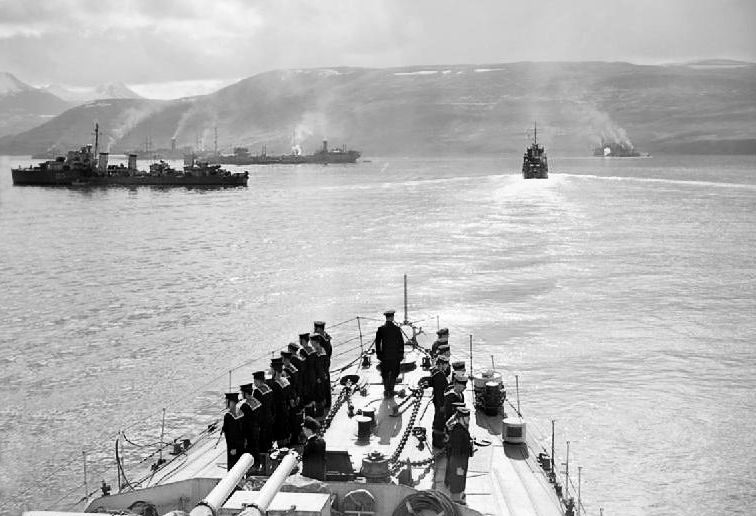
Escorts and merchant ships at Hvalfjord May 1942 before the sailing of Convoy PQ 17

Convoy PQ 17 was a 1942 Allied Arctic convoy carrying supplies destined for the Soviet Union. It comprised 34 merchant ships, four auxiliary ships, and an escort of 21 warships. Close escort was provided by the First Escort Group, under the command of Commander Jack Broome. In addition, the First Cruiser Squadron, under the command Rear Admiral Louis Hamilton, as well as a heavy covering force under the command of Admiral Sir John Tovey, provided further cover from a distance. The convoy sailed on 27 June 1942.

On 4 July, the First Sea Lord, Admiral of the Fleet Sir Dudley Pound, ordered the convoy to scatter, due to fears that it was about to be attacked by German surface vessels, including the battleship Tirpitz. Broome interpreted the order to scatter as indicating that an attack by Tirpitz was imminent. Preparing for battle, he collected the destroyers under his command and attached them to Hamilton's First Cruiser Squadron. It later transpired that Tirpitz and its battlegroup was not in the convoy's vicinity: their planned sortie against the convoy had been cancelled, and the battlegroup had returned to port. Pound had in fact received an intelligence assessment from Paymaster Commander Norman Denning (whose brother Lord Denning sat on Irving and Cassell's appeals in 1971) that the battlegroup was unlikely to attack, but disregarded the advice.

The convoy's merchant ships, left without protection after the scattering of the convoy, became easy targets for Luftwaffe aeroplanes and U-boats. Of the 35 merchant ships, 24 were sunk, with heavy loss of life and supplies. The loss was compounded by the distrust it created among Allies. The Soviet Union did not believe so many ships could be lost in one convoy and openly accused the Western Allies of lying. Despite the help provided by the material delivered, PQ 17 actually worsened Soviet-Allied relations over the short term, with the Soviets never acknowledging the efforts of Allied merchant seaman or sailors. Admiral Ernest King of the United States Navy, already known to distrust the British, was furious with what he perceived as Admiral Pound's bungling and promptly withdrew TF 39, sending it to the Pacific. He hesitated to conduct further joint operations under British command. US Navy Admiral Dan Gallery, who was serving in Iceland at that time, called PQ 17 "a shameful page in naval history".

Broome, a relatively junior officer obeying orders from the Admiralty, was not blamed by his superiors for his actions. Tovey reported that

I do not consider that the commanding officer of the Keppel was in any way to blame for the subsequent heavy losses. From the signals which he had received, he deduced, quite reasonably, that surface action was imminent: and was correct in his decision to concentrate his destroyers and join the rear-admiral commanding first cruiser squadron.

Broome was subsequently promoted to captain and received the Distinguished Service Cross. He received several major commands before retiring from naval service in 1947. He then became a writer and illustrator.

== The Destruction of Convoy PQ-17 ==
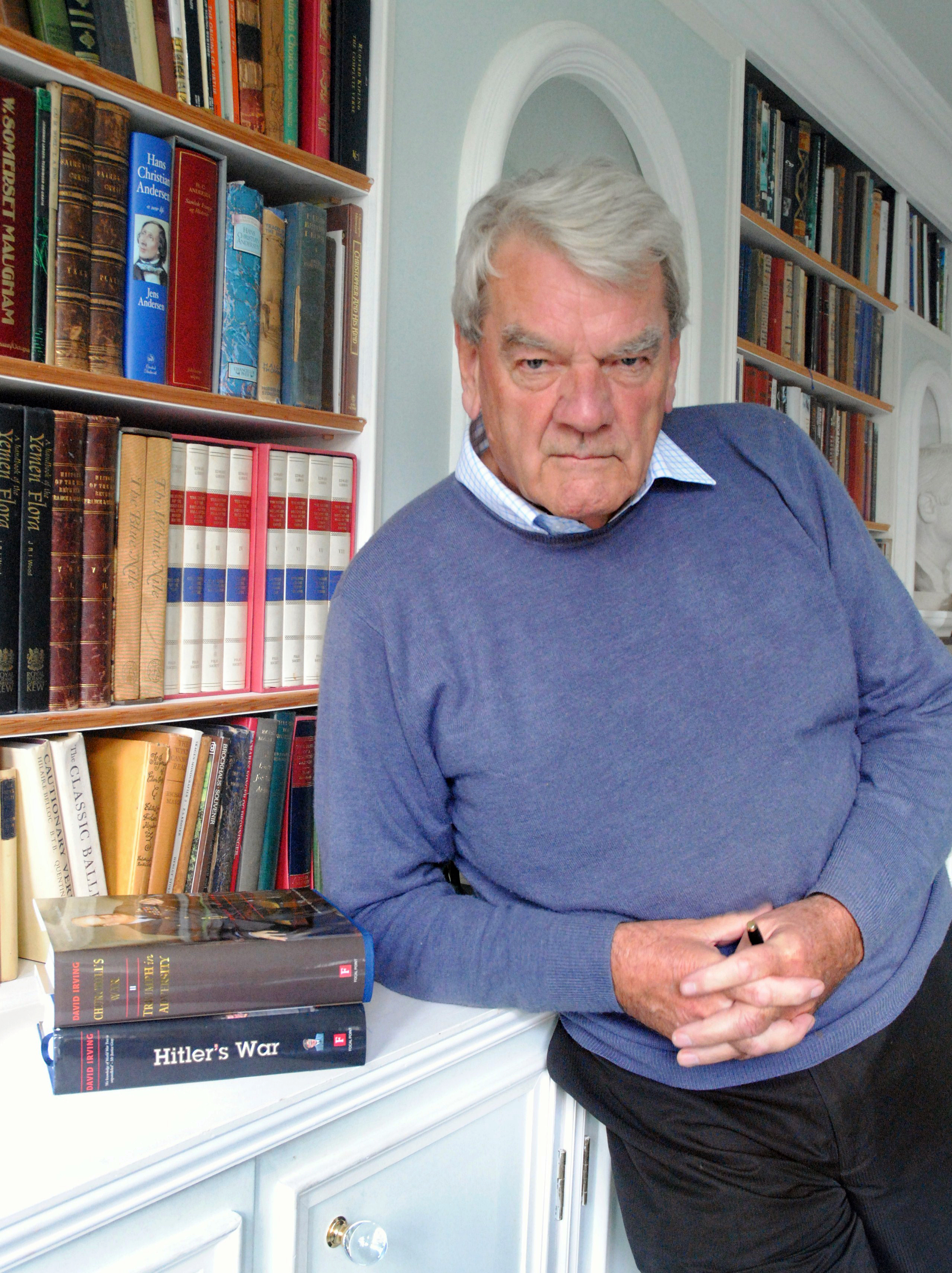
Irving in 2012

In 1968, the British author David Irving finished a manuscript on the destruction of Convoy PQ 17. Originally titled The Knight's Move, it contained several attacks on Broome's conduct during the operation, and generally blamed him for the destruction of the convoy. In particular, it accused Broome of having disobeyed instructions given by Rear-Admiral Hamilton, and had taken the convoy too close to the Norwegian coast, thus exposing it to attacks from land-based Luftwaffe aeroplanes. It accused Broome of having misunderstood the Admiralty's signals, of deserting the convoy because of cowardice, and of not caring about the fate of the merchant ships under his protection.

In October 1966, Irving submitted the manuscript to his publishers, William Kimber & Co Ltd, who in turn sent the manuscript for review to Captain Stephen Roskill, formerly the official historian of the Royal Navy. Roskill replied that "this book reeks of defamation and any publisher should be very cautious before issuing it." At the same time, Irving sent the manuscript to Captain John Litchfield (who had been present at the time) and to Donald McLachlan. Both men rejected Irving's attacks on Broome and condemned his conclusions. Irving also sent the manuscript to Broome, who reacted angrily and threatened legal action. In November 1966, William Kimber told Irving that they were not prepared to publish the manuscript.

Irving then took the manuscript to Cassell in December 1966. In March the following year, Cassell agreed to publish the manuscript in book form, despite Broome's threats. The title was changed to The Destruction of Convoy PQ-17. The publishing contract contained an indemnity clause in which Irving undertook to indemnify Cassell if the book was found to be libellous. Upon hearing of the book's impending publication, Broome wrote to Cassell, who assured him that major changes had been made to the original manuscript, which was not the case. In early 1968, Cassell issued 60 proof copies of the book, along with an advertisement, but stopped the publication in February 1968.

In March 1968, Broome issued a writ for libel against Cassel and Irving in respect of the proof copies. In June, the defendants entered pleas of justification and fair comment. In August 1968, Cassell again changed its mind, and issued the book in hardcover. Broome issued another writ for libel. The two actions were consolidated and was listed for trial in January 1970. Two days before the first hearing, Cassell issued a paperback edition of the book, possibly in anticipation of the publicity the trial would bring.

== High Court ==
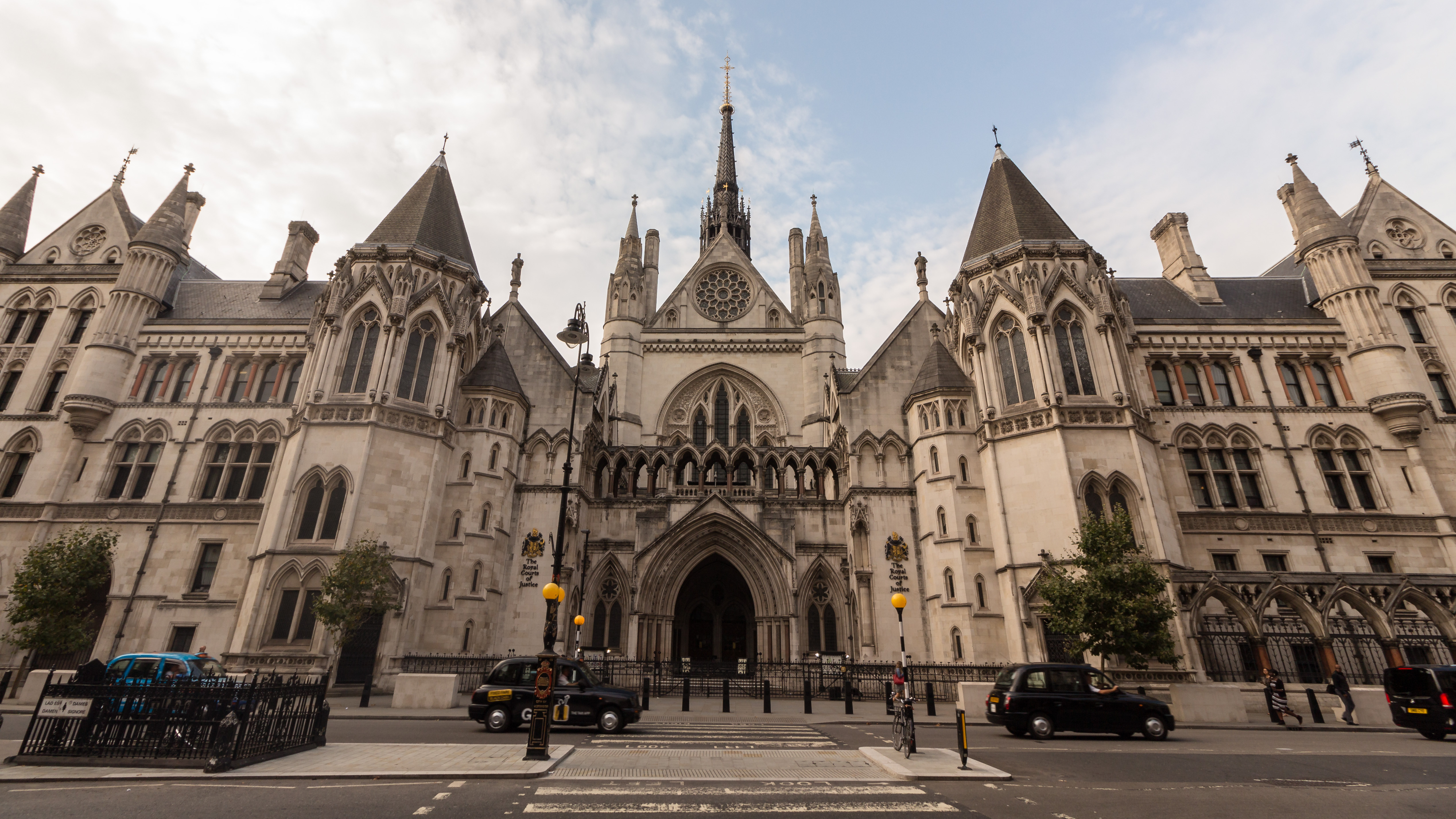
The Royal Courts of Justice, where the case was tried

The trial on the consolidated action opened in the Queen's Bench Division of the High Court of Justice on January 26, 1970, before Mr Justice Lawton and a jury. David Hirst QC represented Broome, while Colin Duncan QC appeared for Irving and Michael Kempster QC represented Cassell.

On January 28, Broome entered the witness box, giving evidence over several days. He told the court that the order to scatter the convoy should not have been given, and that "I never expected that order to be given."

Vice-Admiral Sir William O'Brien, Vice-Admiral Sir John Hayes, Admiral Sir John Frewen, and Vice-Admiral Sir John Eaton, all gave evidence for Broome. Basil Elliott, a policeman who had been a signalman on Broome's ship at the time, gave evidence for him after learning of the trial from a newspaper report. William Kimber, Stephen Roskill and John Litchfield also gave evidence: a film taken by Litchfield hours after the convoy's scattering was shown in court to rebut Irving's claim that Broome was "a broken man" after the convoy scattered.

On 10 February, the plaintiff rested his case; the defendants declined to call any evidence or witnesses. In his final submissions, Hirst accused the defendants of "effrontery" in maintaining that the words complained of were true in the face of the evidence. Michael Kempster, for Cassell, submitted that historians were entitled to paint pictures "warts and all", and maintained that the words complained of were both not defamatory and substantially true.

On 16 February, Lawton J summed up and charged the jury; he instructed the jury that they could award exemplary damages if they found that Irving knowingly lied for profit (the second ground in Rookes v Barnard). However, he cautioned the jury against awarding exemplary damages simply because they think that "he [Irving] is not a very attractive young man".

On 17 February, after five hours of deliberations, the jury returned a verdict for Broome. It awarded him £1,000 in compensatory damages for the publication of the 60 proof copies, £14,000 in compensatory damages for the publication of the hardback edition of the book, and £25,000 by way of exemplary damages, against both Irving and Cassell Ltd. The total, £40,000 in damages, was the highest award for libel in England up to that time. The record would not be broken until 1987, when Jeffrey Archer was awarded £500,000 against the Daily Star. Outside of the courtroom, Broome and Irving shook hands.

== Court of Appeal ==
Irving and Cassell appealed to the Court of Appeal, where a court constituted of Lord Denning MR, Lord Justice Salmon and Lord Justice Phillimore heard the appeal over two weeks in February 1971. Irving appealed against the amount of both the compensatory and exemplary damages, while Cassell only appealed against the amount of exemplary damages. The appellants argued that on the evidence presented at trial, their conduct did not fall within Lord Devlin's second category as set out in Rookes v Barnard, and thus no exemplary damages could be awarded.

=== Exemplary damages and Rookes v Barnard ===
Exemplary damages, also known as punitive damages, have long been controversial in English law. It was criticised on the ground that it confused civil and criminal justice: the former's purpose is to compensate and to restore, while the latter's purpose was to punish and to deter. Compensatory damages were a form of punishment, but one which was administered through civil justice. Defendants in civil cases were liable to be punished through exemplary damages, without the benefit of the safeguards that exist in criminal courts, such as the heightened burden of proof.

In Rookes v Barnard (1964), Lord Devlin severely limited the circumstances under which exemplary damages could be awarded. He declined to abolish exemplary damages, because there were precedents for awarding them, and because there were at least two statutes which mentioned them by name. According to Devlin, they could be awarded in cases:

1. of oppressive, arbitrary or unconstitutional acts by government servants;
2. where the defendant's conduct had been calculated by him to make a profit for himself which might well exceed the compensation payable to the plaintiff;
3. where expressly authorised by statute.

In subsequent years, Rookes v Barnard came under criticism from many quarters. Its approach was rejected by the High Court of Australia, the Supreme Court of Canada, and the Supreme Court (later renamed High Court) of New Zealand. The Judicial Committee of the Privy Council later endorsed the Australian High Court's rejection of Rookes v Barnard.

=== Judgment of the Court of Appeal ===
On March 4, 1971, the Court of Appeal unanimously dismissed the appeals. The three judges all concluded that the defendants' conduct fell into Lord Devlin's second category in Rookes v Barnard, and that therefore the jury was entitled to award exemplary damages.

However, the judges also used the opportunity to attack the House of Lords' decision in Rookes v Barnard. Lord Denning, who gave the main judgment, began by noting that both sides in Rookes v Barnard accepted that juries could award exemplary damages for libel. Yet

when the House came to deliver their speeches, Lord Devlin threw over all that we ever knew about exemplary damages. He knocked down the common law as it had existed for centuries. He laid down a new doctrine about exemplary damages. He said [...] that they could only be awarded in three very limited categories, but in no other category: and all the other lords agreed with him.

After noting that various Commonwealth courts have rejected Lord Devlin's approach, Denning said

This wholesale condemnation justifies us, I think, in examining this new doctrine for ourselves: and I make so bold as to say that it should not be followed any longer in this country. I say this primarily because the common law of England on this subject was so well settled before 1964 – and on such sound and secure foundations — that it was not open to the House of Lords to overthrow it. It could only be done by the legislature.

Denning criticised Devlin's "new doctrine" as "hopelessly illogical and inconsistent.". Of his first category, Denning argued "[o]ther people can be just as oppressive and arbitrary as the servants of the government" and that juries should be able to award exemplary damages for oppressive acts "no matter whether he [the defendant] is a servant of the government or not." Of the second category, Denning said it was not obvious whether a man who committed libel for profit was more worthy of punishment than a man who committed libel whatever it cost him. Denning concluded that "if ever there was a decision of the House of Lords given per incuriam, this was it". Finally, Denning said that:

the difficulties presented by Rookes v. Barnard are so great that the judges should direct the juries in accordance with the law as it was understood before Rookes v. Barnard.

Salmon and Phillimore LJJ delivered separate judgments agreeing with Lord Denning.

== House of Lords ==
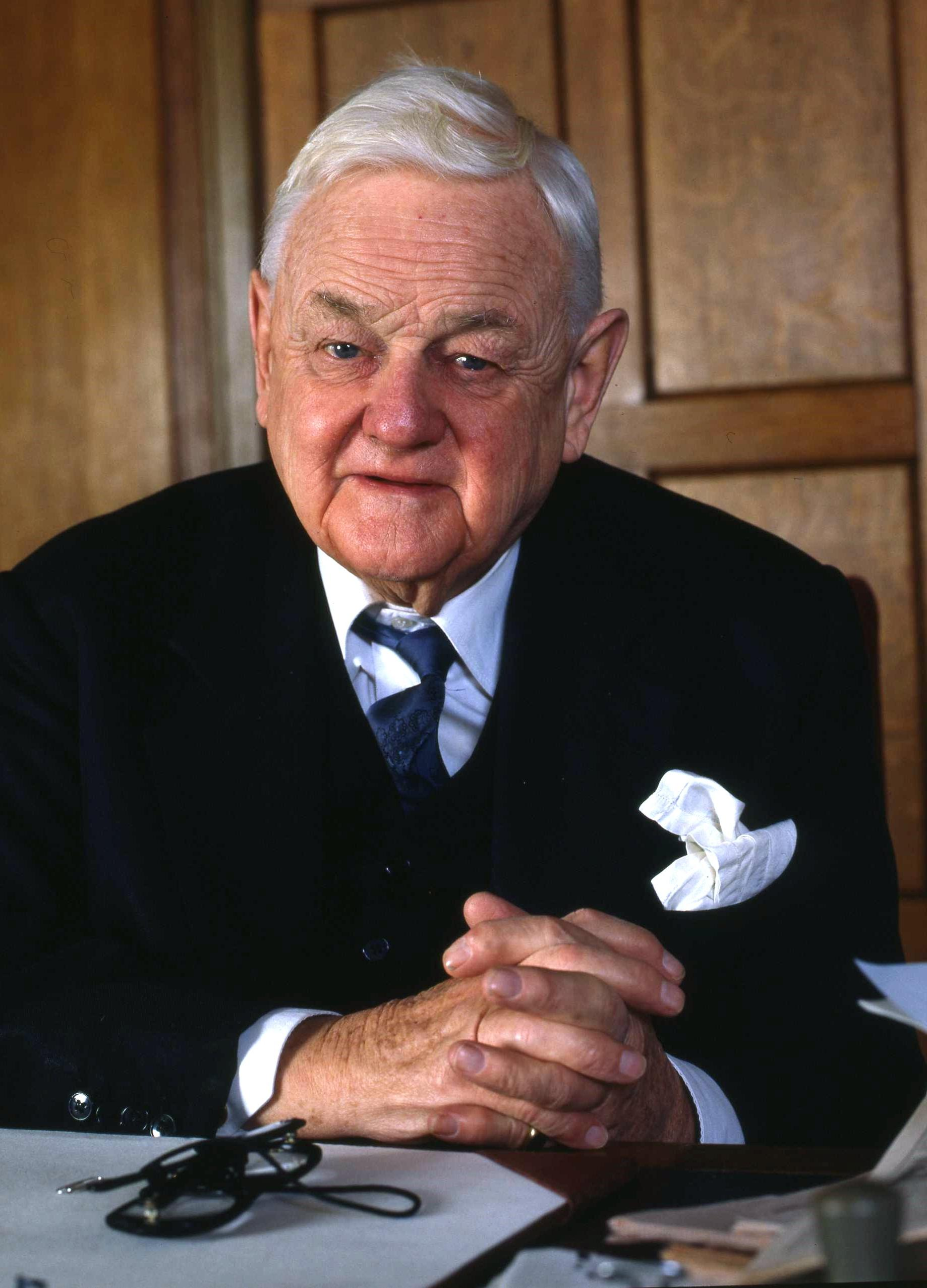
Lord Hailsham of St Marylebone, who rebuked the Court of Appeal

An appeal was lodged to the Judicial functions of the House of Lords. A panel constituted of Lord Hailsham of St Marylebone LC, Lord Reid, Lord Morris of Borth-y-Gest, Viscount Dilhorne, Lord Wilberforce, Lord Diplock, and Lord Kilbrandon, heard the appeal over 13 days in November and December 1971. Exceptionally, seven law lords sat for the appeal, whereas appeals to the House of Lords were usually heard by panels of five.

On 23 February 1972, the House of Lords dismissed the appeals. A majority of the House (Viscount Dilhorne, Lord Wilberforce and Lord Diplock dissenting) found that the trial judge had adequately directed the jury on the question of exemplary damages, and that the jury's award of damages, though large, was not unreasonable.

However, Lord Hailsham criticised the Court of Appeal in very strong terms for instructing trial judges to ignore the House of Lords' decision in Rookes v Barnard:

The fact is, and I hope it will never be necessary to say so again, that, in the hierarchical system of courts which exists in this country, it is necessary for each lower tier, including the Court of Appeal, to accept loyally the decisions of the higher tiers. Where decisions manifestly conflict, the decision in Young v. Bristol Aeroplane Co. Ltd. [1944] K.B. 718 offers guidance to each tier in matters affecting its own decisions. It does not entitle it to question considered decisions in the upper tiers with the same freedom. Even this House, since it has taken freedom to review its own decisions, will do so cautiously.

Lord Hailsham then went on to defend Lord Devlin's decision as being compatible with previous decisions of the House of Lords, which Lord Denning had suggested went against the holding in Rookes v Barnard.

Lord Reid criticised exemplary damages as anomalous and opposed their extension to any class of case which was not covered by previous authority. For his part, Lord Wilberforce thought that the "heavy, indeed exorbitant" English costs system already gave English civil justice a punitive element. However, he thought Lord Devlin did not mean to limit punitive damages in defamation cases.

Julius Stone described the Lords' decision as "what may well be the most hostile affirmation of a Court of Appeal decision in our history."

== Aftermath ==
=== Legal ===
After the House of Lords' decision, there was further litigation over the costs of the case. In May 1972, the House of Lords ruled that "in the peculiar circumstances of this case", Cassell only needed to pay half of Broome's taxed costs in the House of Lords and in the Court of Appeal. This had the effect of shrinking Broome's damages. Judicial interpretations of Rookes v Barnard in the light of the House of Lords' decision in Broome v Cassell still remain contentious, as seen in Kuddus v Chief Constable of Leicestershire Constabulary.

=== Personal ===
Captain Broome died in 1985, aged 84. In 1981, he had written of his "everlasting regret" at having obeyed Admiral Pound's order to scatter the convoy.

William Kimber, who had refused to publish Irving's manuscript of the book, later republished the book under his own imprint, with the offending passages deleted.

In the 1980s, Irving increasingly moved out of the historical mainstream and became a Holocaust denier. In 1996, Irving sued Penguin Books and American historian Deborah E. Lipstadt for libel for publishing a book which called Irving a Holocaust denier and a falsifier, among other things. At the trial in the High Court in 2000, Irving, who represented himself, referred to the fact that "it is almost 30 years to the day since I last set foot in these Law Courts" and telling the judge that he "became more prudent about how I wrote" since that Broome v Cassell. Irving lost that case as well, and declared bankruptcy as a result.
