= David Hirst (judge) =

British judge

The Right Honourable Sir David Hirst

Lord Justice of Appeal
- In office 1992 – April 1999
- Succeeded by: Sir Jonathan Mance

Justice of the High Court
- In office 22 January 1982 – 1992
- Preceded by: Sir John May

Personal details
- Born: David Cozens-Hardy Hirst; 31 July 1925 Meltham, West Riding of Yorkshire
- Died: 31 December 2011 (aged 86) London, England
- Spouse: Pamela Bevan (m. 1951)
- Children: 5
- Education: Trinity College, Cambridge

Sir David Cozens-Hardy Hirst (31 July 1925 – 31 December 2011) was an English barrister and judge who served as a Lord Justice of Appeal from 1992 to 1999. The Times described him as "one of the leading advocates of his generation".

== Early life ==
Hirst was born in Meltham, the son of Thomas William Hirst and Margaret Joy (née Cozens-Hardy). His father was a cotton mill owner. His mother was a member of the Cozens-Hardy family of Norfolk; his maternal grandfather founded a firm of solicitors in Norwich, while his great-uncle was the politician and judge Herbert Cozens-Hardy, 1st Baron Cozens-Hardy, who served as Master of the Rolls from 1907 to 1918.

He was educated at Packwood Haugh School and Eton College, where he was a King's Scholar. He was called up for war service in 1943 and joined the Royal Artillery, but because of training accident he never saw action. He was commissioned into the Intelligence Corps in 1945, and was posted to Singapore and then Burma before being demobilised in 1947 with the rank of captain. He then read history and law at Trinity College, Cambridge, before being called to the bar by Inner Temple in 1951.

== Career at the bar ==
Hirst did his pupillage in the chambers of Eric Sachs QC at 4 Paper Building, before beginning a general common law practice on the South-Eastern circuit. In 1953, he was second junior to Neville Faulks QC, who was prosecuting the "pottery conspiracy" case at the Old Bailey, the longest trial in the court's history until then. Faulks was impressed by his performance, and invited him to join his chambers at 1 Brick Court, a fashionable set specialising in defamation; Hirst became head of chambers in 1965. Other tenants of his chambers included Colin Duncan, Brian Neill, and Leon Brittan, his only pupil.

In the 1960s, Hirst appeared in many high-profile libel trials. In 1961, he apologised to suspected serial killer Dr John Bodkin Adams on behalf of the Daily Mail, which had published a report stating he had been identified as the poisoner of many of his patients.

In 1964, led by Lord Gardiner QC, he acted for the author Leon Uris in Dering v Uris. Dr Wladyslaw Alexander Dering, a Polish-born GP, sued Uris because a footnote in his novel Exodus, in which he alleged Dering had performed thousands of human experiments on prisoners at Auschwitz. Dering admitted to have carried out some of the operations, but pleaded that he had acted under duress. The jury found for the plaintiff, but awarded him one halfpenny (the smallest coin in circulation) in damages. Hirst had advised the defendants to pay £2 into court; since Dering had received less in damages, he became liable for the defendants' legal costs.

Hirst became a Queen's Counsel in 1965. The following year, he won £5,000 in damages for Lord Russell of Liverpool against Private Eye, which called him "Lord Liver of Cesspool" and suggested he wrote a book about German war crimes to stimulate prurient interests. In 1967, he won an apology and "substantial damages" for the writer R.J. Minney against the historian M. R. D. Foot. Minney had written a biography of World War II heroine Violette Szabo, which detailed torture at the hands of the Gestapo, which Foot alleged were the products of author's "prurient imagination".

His most famous case as a QC was in 1970, when he represented retired Royal Navy captain Jack Broome against the controversial writer David Irving and Cassel Ltd in Broome v Cassell. Cassell had published a book by Irving blaming Broome for the destruction of World War II Arctic convoy PQ 17. The jury awarded Broome £40,000 in damages, the largest libel award made in England until Jeffrey Archer's libel suit against the Daily Star in 1987. The defendants appealed, but the House of Lords upheld the damages.

In the 1970s Hirst shifted to commercial work. He represented Paul McCartney in his 1971 lawsuit to dissolve the Beatles' legal partnership. He subsequently acted for all the Beatles in their lawsuit against their manager Allen Klein. He also acted for the Bee Gees.

In 1974, he was elected a bencher of the Inner Temple, and served as reader in 1994 and treasurer in 1995. He served as chairman of the Bar Council between 1978 and 1979. He was a strong defender of barristers' exclusive right of audience in front of the higher courts.

== Judicial career ==
Hirst refused a High Court judgeship after his term as chairman of the Bar Council, before changing his mind. He was appointed a Justice of the High Court in 1982, and received the customary knighthood the same year. He was assigned to the Queen's Bench Division and later sat in the Commercial Court.

In 1992, he was appointed a Lord Justice of Appeal and sworn of the Privy Council. In 1995, he was one of the judges who heard Emma Humphreys' appeal against her conviction for murder, substituting a verdict of manslaughter. He retired in 1999 and was succeeded by Mr Justice Mance. From 2000 to 2010 he chaired the Spoliation Advisory Panel, which advises the British government on claims for cultural property looted during the Nazi era.

Hirst died 31 December 2011 in London, after a long illness.

== Family ==
Hirst met his wife, Pamela Elizabeth Molesworth Bevan, of Longstowe Hall, while at Cambridge. They married in 1951 and had three sons and two daughters. His son, Jonathan Hirst QC (1953–2017), was, like father, chairman of the Bar Council.
