= Pikul House =

Historical building in Russia

- Дом Пикуля в Северодвинске
- Front view of the house

General information
- Status: Emergency condition
- Architectural style: classicism, modernism, soviet architecture
- Location: Arkhangelsk Oblast
- Address: Industrialnaya street, 36/19
- Town or city: Severodvinsk
- Country: Russian Federation
- Coordinates: 64°33′44″N 39°49′54″E
- Current tenants: "Pikul Hotel" company
- Opened: 1940
- Landlord: City administration of Severodvinsk

Technical details
- Floor count: 2
- Known for: Valentin Pikul, former house's inhabitant

Other information
- Public transit access: 1, 16, 18

The Pikul house in Severodvinsk (Russian: Дом Пикуля в Северодвинске, Dom Pukulya v Severodvinske) is a wooden two-story building at the intersection of Industrialnaya and Polyarnaya streets. The house is famous for the fact that future famous Soviet writer Valentin Savvich Pikul lived in it in 1940–1941.

== History of the house ==
The house was built in 1940 for the workers of the new city of Molotovsk (since 1957 Severodvinsk) and shows up as an example of wooden Soviet architecture of the first half of the 20th century. Valentin Pikul's father moved to Molotovsk in July 1940 to work at a shipyard. In September 1940, young Valentin Pikul moved from Leningrad with his mother to one of the communal apartments overlooking a spacious terrace in that house.

During his life in Molotovsk, Valentin finished the 5th grade of middle school and went to the House of Pioneers for the Young Sailor group, but already in 1941, after the exams, he left Molotovsk and returned to Leningrad.

== Today's situation ==
Nameplate on the house in Russian

Backyard of the house

On 26 July 2005, the wear and tear of the house amounted to 62%. The condition was declared critical and the house was resettled. According to the program "Resettlement of citizens from emergency housing stock for 2013–2017" it had to be demolished. However, in 2016, because of the support of local activists, including the "My Severodvinsk" movement, a cultural and historical inspection of the house was carried out. Experts defined the house as "an example of the classicism style with modern elements." According to their conclusions, in 2018, "The Pikul House in Severodvinsk" was recognized as a monument of urban planning and architecture of regional significance in Arkhangelsk Oblast.

For 2 years of being on the balance of the city budget, 2.2 million rubles were spent on the Pikul house from the budget. With the city's expenditures in 2021 in the amount of 8.7 billion rubles, the city administration called the maintenance of that house an "excessive burden".

In 2021, during the coronavirus pandemic, the house was put up for rent for 49 years for only 1 ruble. The condition for rent was to repair the building and to create Pikul museum room. As a result of the auction, the Severodvinsk company "Pikul Hotel" became the tenant of the house. It is going to place a hotel inside the house
