= HMS Camperdown (D32) =

Battle-class destroyer of the Royal Navy

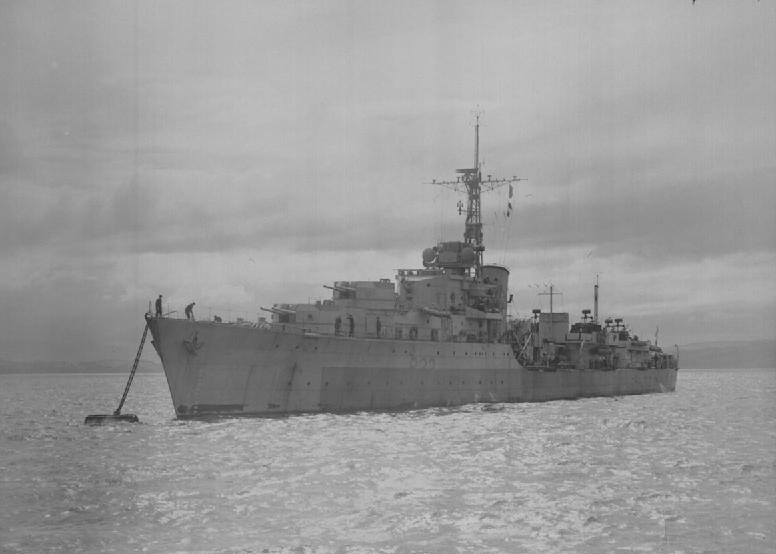

History

United Kingdom
- Name: HMS Camperdown
- Builder: Fairfield Shipbuilding and Engineering Company
- Laid down: 30 October 1942
- Launched: 8 February 1944
- Commissioned: 18 June 1945
- Identification: Pennant number D32
- Fate: Scrapped 1970

General characteristics
- Class & type: Battle-class destroyer
- Displacement: 2,325 tons standard; 3,430 tons full load
- Length: 379 ft (116 m)
- Beam: 40 ft (12 m)
- Draught: 15.3 ft (4.7 m)
- Propulsion: 2 steam turbines, 2 shafts, 2 boilers, 50,000 shp (37 MW)
- Speed: 35.75 knots (66.21 km/h)
- Range: 4,400 nautical miles (8,100 km) at 12 knots (22 km/h)
- Complement: 268
- Armament: 2 × dual 4.5-inch (114 mm) gun; 1 × single 4-inch (102 mm) gun; 14 × Bofors 40 mm gun; 10 × 21 inch (533 mm) torpedo tubes; 1 × Squid mortar

Service record
- Part of: British Pacific Fleet; 19th Destroyer Flotilla; 3rd Destroyer Flotilla; 1st Destroyer Squadron

HMS Camperdown was a Battle-class destroyer of the Royal Navy (RN). She was named after the Battle of Camperdown, a naval engagement between the British and Dutch that took place in 1797, and which resulted in a British victory.

She was built by Fairfields and launched on 8 February 1944 and commissioned on 18 June 1945.

== Service ==
Camperdown was despatched to the Far East, joining the 19th Destroyer Flotilla of the British Pacific Fleet after VJ Day and so did not see action during the Second World War. In November 1946, Camperdown, along with the rest of the 19th Flotilla, returned to the United Kingdom, and was placed in reserve at Devonport in April 1947.

Camperdown was refitted from January to May 1950, and on 26 May 1953, was recommissioned for trials. She formed part of the Fleet Review on the Solent to celebrate the Coronation of Elizabeth II on 15 June 1953 as part of the reserve fleet, a record of which can be found displayed on board the royal yacht Britannia.

In 1953, at Plymouth, Camperdown was accidentally rammed by Coreopsis, a Flower-class corvette (renamed Compass Rose for her role in the film The Cruel Sea), causing damage to the destroyer. Camperdown was refitted and modernised at Liverpool between 18 May 1956 and 29 October 1957. After trials, on 10 December 1957, the ship joined the 3rd Destroyer Squadron, which alternated between service with the Home Fleet and the Mediterranean Fleet, replacing St. Kitts, which had been withdrawn from use because of poor condition. On 21 September 1958, a fire broke out in Camperdown's boiler room while the destroyer was taking part in a NATO exercise, damaging electrical cables but causing no casualties. In 1960, Camperdown joined the 1st Destroyer Squadron, with spells with the Home and Mediterranean Fleets. In 1962, Camperdown was placed on the disposal list and in 1970, she was finally scrapped at Faslane.

== Publications ==
- Colledge, J. J.; Warlow, Ben (2006) [1969]. Ships of the Royal Navy: The Complete Record of All Fighting Ships of the Royal Navy from the 15th Century to the Present (3rd Rev ed.). London: Chatham Publishing. ISBN 978-1-86176-281-8. OCLC 67375475.
- Critchley, Mike (1982). British Warships Since 1945: Part 3: Destroyers. Liskeard, UK: Maritime Books. ISBN 0-9506323-9-2.
- English, John (2008). Obdurate to Daring: British Fleet Destroyers 1941–45. Windsor: World Ship Society. ISBN 978-0-9560769-0-8.
- Hodges, Peter (1971). Battle Class Destroyers. London: Almark Publishing. ISBN 0-85524-012-1.
- Marriott, Leo (1989). Royal Navy Destroyers Since 1945. London: Ian Allan. ISBN 0-7110-1817-0.
