= Louis Keppel Hamilton =

Royal Navy Admiral (1890–1957)

Admiral Sir Louis Keppel Hamilton KCB DSO*
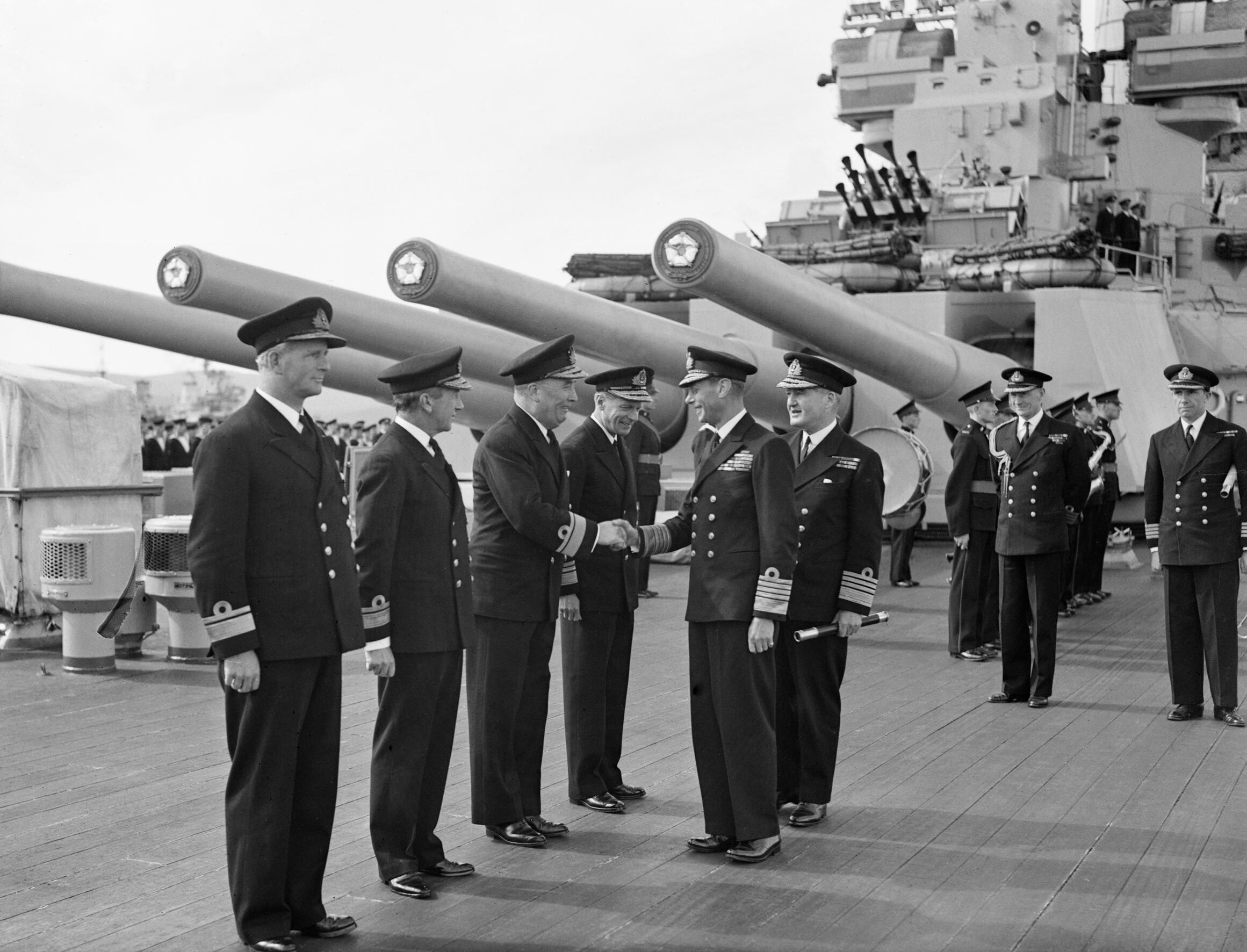
- Rear Admiral Keppel Hamilton, second from left, meets King George VI aboard HMS Duke of York at Scapa Flow, August 1943
- Born: 31 December 1890; St George Hanover Square, London
- Died: 27 June 1957 (aged 66); King Edward VII's Hospital, London
- Military career
- Allegiance: United Kingdom
- Branch: Royal Navy
- Service years: 1908–1948
- Rank: Admiral
- Commands: Chief of the Australian Naval Staff (1945–1948); Flag Officer, Malta (1943–45); 1st Cruiser Squadron (1942–43); Home Fleet Destroyer Flotillas (1941); HMS Aurora (1940); HMS Ambuscade (1928–29); HMS Wild Swan (1927–28); HMS Wanderer (1927); HMS Taurus (1917–18); HMS Moorsom (1915–16)
- Conflicts: First World War: West Africa Campaign; Second World War: Norwegian campaign; Arctic Convoys
- Awards: Knight Commander of the Order of the Bath; Distinguished Service Order & Bar; Mentioned in Despatches (2); Order of Saint Stanislaus, 3rd Class (Russia); War Cross (Norway)

Admiral Sir Louis Henry Keppel Hamilton, KCB, DSO & Bar (31 December 1890 – 27 June 1957) was a Royal Navy admiral. He was Flag Officer in Malta (1943–1945) and later served as First Naval Member and Chief of Naval Staff of the Royal Australian Navy.

== Background and early life ==
Hamilton was the first of the two sons of Admiral Sir Frederick Hamilton, who was Second Sea Lord during the First World War, by his marriage to Maria Walpole Keppel, a daughter of Admiral of the Fleet Sir Henry Keppel. He grew up at Anmer Hall near King's Lynn in Norfolk. Two of his middle names were in honour of his notable grandfather, Henry Keppel. His paternal grandfather, Captain Henry George Hamilton (1808–1879), was also a Royal Navy officer, while his great-grandfather, William Richard Hamilton (1777–1859), was an Under-Secretary at the Foreign Office, British Minister to the Kingdom of the Two Sicilies, and an archaeologist.

An uncle, his mother's brother, became Admiral Sir Colin Richard Keppel. His grandfather's two eldest brothers were Augustus Keppel, 5th Earl of Albemarle and George Keppel, 6th Earl of Albemarle.

== Naval career ==
Hamilton joined the Royal Navy in 1908 with the rank of midshipman. On 30 June 1911, he was promoted sub-lieutenant, and on 30 June 1913 lieutenant.

During the First World War, Hamilton saw active service in the West Africa Campaign, on the Niger River and in the German colony of Kamerun. He commanded the Niger river flotilla which drove the Germans out of Dehane in December 1914, then led a party from the coast which transported a naval 12-pounder gun taken out of HMS Challenger on an epic journey of 640 miles along the Niger and Benue rivers, then sixty miles overland, to assist Brigadier-General Cunliffe in the taking of Garoua from a German garrison. Garoua fell in June 1915. In September 1915 he was awarded the Distinguished Service Order "for his services in the operations in the Cameroons" and was also awarded the Order of Saint Stanislaus of Russia, 3rd class.

He saw active service again in the Second World War, including taking part in the Allied reactions to the German invasion of Norway in 1940 (as commander of HMS Aurora), for which he was awarded the Norwegian War Cross, and the protection of Arctic convoys. In 1942, he was a Rear Admiral commanding the First Cruiser Squadron (CS1), which consisted of the British cruisers HMS London and Norfolk, the American cruisers USS Wichita and Tuscaloosa, and four destroyers. In that role, he was one of the senior officers of the disastrous Convoy PQ 17.

Between 1943 and 1945, Hamilton was Flag Officer, Malta, and while there was knighted by being appointed a Knight Commander of the Order of the Bath. After the war, he served as First Naval Member of the Australian Commonwealth Naval Board & Chief of Naval Staff, the professional head of the Royal Australian Navy, from 1945 to 1948, during which he was promoted to admiral on 16 May 1947. He retired from the navy in September 1948.

Hamilton died at King Edward VII's Hospital for Officers on 22 June 1957, when his home address was 64, Pont Street, London. He left an estate valued at £72,095 and probate was granted to Miss Jean Hamilton.

Military offices
Preceded by Sir Arthur Power	Flag Officer, Malta; 1943–1945	Succeeded by Sir Frederick Dalrymple-Hamilton
Preceded by Sir Guy Royle	Chief of the Australian Naval Staff; 1945–1948	Succeeded by Sir John Collins
