= The Favorite (novel) =

1984 novel by Valentin Pikul

- Author: Valentin Pikul
- Language: Russian
- Genre: Historical novel
- Publication date: 1984
- Publication place: Soviet Union
- ISBN: 9785170133604
- OCLC: 783291134
- Text: The Favorite at Wikisource

The Favorite (Russian: Фаворит) is a historical novel by Soviet writer Valentin Pikul, written in 1979-82.

== Plot ==
The novel describes the life of an outstanding military and political figure of the second half of the 18th century, Grigory Potemkin. Being one of the most "officially" beloved of Catherine the Great, Potemkin had a huge influence on the Empress, but he used it not only for personal gain, but for the good of the state. Potemkin became famous as a wise politician, an experienced diplomat, a brave captain. Under his leadership, major reforms have been carried out in the Russian army. However, envy and hatred of the last favorite of Catherine II, Count Platon Zubov led Potemkin to disgrace at first, and then to a premature death.

Much of the novel is devoted to the description of two Russian-Turkish wars, Crimean Khanate was destroyed as a result of this and the occupied territories were incorporated into the Russian Empire.
