= HMS Coreopsis (K32) =

Flower-class corvette

History

United Kingdom
- Name: HMS Coreopsis
- Namesake: Coreopsis
- Ordered: 25 July 1939
- Builder: A. & J. Inglis Ltd, Glasgow
- Laid down: 19 September 1939
- Launched: 23 April 1940
- Commissioned: 17 August 1940
- Decommissioned: 10 November 1943
- Identification: Pennant number: K32
- Fate: Transferred to Royal Hellenic Navy

Kingdom of Greece
- Name: Kriezis
- Namesake: Antonios Kriezis
- Acquired: 10 November 1943
- Commissioned: 11 June 1942
- Decommissioned: 1 June 1952
- Identification: Pennant number: K32
- Fate: Returned to Royal Navy: sold and broken-up at Sunderland on 22 July 1952

General characteristics
- Class & type: Flower-class corvette
- Displacement: 925 long tons (940 t; 1,036 short tons)
- Length: 205 ft (62.48 m)o/a
- Beam: 33 ft 2 in (10.11 m)
- Draught: 13 ft 7 in (4.14 m)
- Propulsion: single shaft; 2 × fire tube Scotch boilers; 1 × 4-cycle triple-expansion reciprocating steam engine; 2,750 ihp (2,050 kW)
- Speed: 16.5 knots (30.6 km/h)
- Range: 3,500 nautical miles (6,482 km) at 12 knots (22.2 km/h)
- Complement: 85
- Sensors & processing systems: 1 × SW1C or 2C radar; 1 × Type 123A or Type 127DV sonar
- Armament: 1 × 4-inch BL Mk.IX single gun; 2 × .50 cal machine gun (twin); 2 × Lewis .303 cal machine gun (twin); 2 × Mk.II depth charge throwers; 2 × Depth charge rails with 40 depth charges; originally fitted with minesweeping gear, later removed

HMS Coreopsis was a Flower-class corvette, built for the Royal Navy during the Second World War which served in the Battle of the Atlantic. In 1943, she was transferred to the Royal Hellenic Navy as RHNS Kriezis (Greek: ΒΠ Κριεζής) and participated in the 1944 Invasion of Normandy. Shortly before she was scrapped, she took part in the British war film, The Cruel Sea.

== Service ==
Coreopsis was built at A. & J. Inglis Ltd in Glasgow as part of the 1939 War Emergency Programme for the Royal Navy. One of the early Flower-class corvettes, she was ordered on 25 July 1939, and laid down on 19 September. She was launched on 23 April 1940 and commissioned on 17 August.

=== Royal Navy ===
In Royal Navy service, Coreopsis was employed on convoy escort duty in the Atlantic. On 20 October 1940, she rescued 33 survivors from the British cargo ship MV La Estancia sunk by the German submarine U-47 south of Iceland. On 16 November 1942, she rescued 169 survivors from the British merchant ship SS Clan MacTaggart that was sunk by U-92 off Cádiz. On 5 March 1943, she picked up survivors from the British merchant ships SS Fidra, SS Ger-y-Bryn and SS Trefusis which had been sunk by U-130 northwest of Lisbon.

=== Royal Hellenic Navy ===
Coreopsis was transferred to the Royal Hellenic Navy on 1 November 1943, one of several British escort vessels transferred to Greece after April 1941. Renamed Kriezis (Greek: Κριεζής, after the naval hero Antonios Kriezis) but retaining her K32 pennant number, she served as a convoy escort out of Liverpool and on 13 June 1944, escorted Convoy ECM6 which was part of Operation Neptune, the maritime element of the Normandy Landings. She joined the British Mediterranean Fleet in October 1944. She remained with the Greek navy after the war and was finally returned to the Royal Navy on 1 June 1952.

=== Filming and disposal ===
While awaiting disposal at Malta in 1952, Coreopsis was acquired by Ealing Studios for the film The Cruel Sea, in which she took the part of the fictional Flower-class corvette, HMS Compass Rose. During filming at Plymouth, she collided with the destroyer HMS Camperdown causing some damage to the latter. In the film, she wore the pennant number K49, actually the number of HMS Crocus. She finally arrived at the breaker's yard of Thomas Young & Sons in Sunderland on 22 July 1952 where she was scrapped.
