= Requiem for Convoy PQ-17 =

Requiem for Convoy PQ-17 is a historical novel by the Russian writer Valentin Pikul, written between 1969 and 1973. It describes the history of Convoy PQ 17, one of the Arctic convoys of World War II. The book includes description of the hunt for the Bismarck and other events.

Pikul chose a quotation from the similarly themed HMS Ulysses by Alistair MacLean as an epigraph.
