= The Arctic Convoy =

2023 Norwegian film

- Directed by: Henrik Martin Dahlsbakken
- Written by: Christian Siebenherz; Harald Rosenløw Eeg; Lars Gudmestad
- Produced by: Martin Sundland; Catrin Gundersen; Thea Benedikte Karlsen
- Starring: Anders Baasmo Christiansen; Tobias Santelmann
- Cinematography: Oskar Dahlsbakken
- Music by: Johannes Ringen
- Production company: Fantefilm
- Release date: 25 December 2023
- Running time: 108 minutes
- Country: Norway
- Language: Norwegian

The Arctic Convoy (original title: Konvoi) is a 2023 Norwegian war drama film directed by Henrik Martin Dahlsbakken. The film is inspired by the story of Convoy PQ 17, one of the Arctic convoys of World War II.

== Plot ==
In 1942 a cargo ship with a Norwegian and Swedish crew, part of an Allied Arctic convoy transporting weapons to the Soviet Union, continues on its way after the disintegration of the convoy and the retreat of its military escort, making a perilous journey through waters patrolled by German forces.

== Cast ==
- Anders Baasmo Christiansen as Captain Skar
- Tobias Santelmann as Mørk
- Heidi Ruud Ellingsen as Ragnhild, the radio operator
- Preben Hodneland as Lars
- Adam Lundgren as Johan
- Fredrik Stenberg Ditlev-Simonsen as Martinsen
- Jon Ranes as Sigurd
- Jakob Fort as Evensen
- Tord Kinge as Isaksen

== Trivia ==
The radio operator character (the only woman on the ship) was inspired by Fern Blodgett Sunde.

== Reception ==
On the review aggregator website Rotten Tomatoes, 100% of 7 critics' reviews are positive.
