= The Cruel Sea (1953 film) =

1953 British film by Charles Frend

- Original British film poster
- Directed by: Charles Frend
- Written by: Eric Ambler
- Based on: The Cruel Sea by Nicholas Monsarrat
- Produced by: Leslie Norman, Norman Priggen & Michael Balcon (executive producer)
- Starring: Jack Hawkins; Donald Sinden; Denholm Elliott; Virginia McKenna; Stanley Baker
- Cinematography: Gordon Dines
- Edited by: Peter Tanner
- Music by: Alan Rawsthorne
- Production company: Ealing Studios
- Distributed by: GDF (UK); Universal-International (US)
- Release dates: 24 March 1953 (UK); 19 August 1953 (US)
- Running time: 126 minutes
- Country: United Kingdom
- Language: English
- Box office: $840,000 (UK) $600,000 (US)

The Cruel Sea is a 1953 British war film based on the best-selling 1951 novel of the same name by former naval officer Nicholas Monsarrat, though the screenplay by Eric Ambler omits some of the novel's grimmest moments. The film stars Jack Hawkins, Donald Sinden, Denholm Elliott, Stanley Baker, Liam Redmond, Virginia McKenna and Moira Lister. The movie was made by Ealing Studios seven years after the end of World War II. It was directed by Charles Frend and produced by Leslie Norman.

The film portrays the conditions in which the Battle of the Atlantic was fought between the Royal Navy and Germany's U-boats, seen from the viewpoint of the British naval officers and seamen who served in convoy escorts.

== Plot ==
A voice-over by Lieutenant-Commander George Ericson, a British Merchant Navy officer in the Royal Naval Reserve, declares:

This is a story of the Battle of the Atlantic, the story of an ocean, two ships, and a handful of men. The men are the heroes; the heroines are the ships. The only villain is the sea, the cruel sea, that man has made more cruel...

In late 1939, just as war breaks out, Ericson is recalled to the Royal Navy and given command of HMS Compass Rose, a new Flower-class corvette intended for convoy escort duties. His sub-lieutenants, Lockhart and Ferraby, are both newly commissioned and without experience at sea. The new first lieutenant, James Bennett is an abusive martinet.

Despite these initial disadvantages, the ship's company gains hard experience and becomes an effective fighting unit. At first their worst enemy is the weather, since German submarines lack the range to attack shipping far into the Atlantic. With the Fall of France, French ports become available to the Germans and U-boats can attack convoys anywhere in the Atlantic – making bad weather the convoys' greatest advantage. Germany is joined in the war by Italy, while the Spanish dictator Franco allows Axis U-boats to use Spanish harbours.

The first lieutenant is put ashore due to illness, the junior officers mature with Lockhart becoming the new first lieutenant and the ship crosses the Atlantic many times escorting convoys, often in brutal weather. They witness the sinking of many merchant vessels they are charged with protecting and the tragic deaths of merchant navy crewmen. A key scene involves Ericson's decision to carry out a depth charge attack even though the blast will kill merchant seamen floating in the water. After close to three years of service, including one U-boat sunk, Compass Rose is torpedoed and her crew forced to abandon ship. Most of the crew are lost. Taking to a couple of liferafts, Ericson survives this ordeal along with his first lieutenant, Lockhart, and with the few crew left (including Ferraby) they are picked up the next day.

Ericson is promoted commander, and together with Lockhart, now promoted to Lieutenant commander, takes command of a new Castle-class frigate, HMS Saltash Castle. With Ericson leading an anti-submarine escort group they continue the monotonous but vital duty of convoy escort. Late in the war, while serving with the Arctic convoys, they doggedly pursue and sink another U-boat, marked as U-53, Saltash Castle's only "kill". As the war ends, the ship returns to an anchorage to guard a number of German submarines that have surrendered.

== Cast ==
(in credits order)

- Jack Hawkins as Lieutenant Commander (later Commander) George Ericson, RNR
- Donald Sinden as Sub-Lieutenant (later Lieutenant then Lieutenant-Commander) Keith Lockhart, RNVR
- John Stratton as Sub-Lieutenant Gordon Ferraby, RNVR
- Denholm Elliott as Sub-Lieutenant John Morell, RNVR
- John Warner as Sub-Lieutenant Baker, RNVR
- Stanley Baker as Lieutenant James Bennett, RANVR
- Bruce Seton as Petty Officer (later Chief Petty Officer) Bob Tallow (Coxswain)
- Liam Redmond as Chief Engine Room Artificer Jim Watts
- Virginia McKenna as Second Officer Julie Hallam, WRNS
- Moira Lister as Mrs Elaine Morell
- June Thorburn as Mrs Doris Ferraby
- Megs Jenkins as Mrs Gladys Bell (Tallow's sister)
- Meredith Edwards as Yeoman of Signals Wells
- Glyn Houston as Leading Seaman Phillips
- Alec McCowen as Leading Seaman Tonbridge
- Leo Phillips as Leading Torpedoman Wainwright
- Dafydd Havard as Signalman Rose
- Fred Griffiths as Leading Stoker Gracey
- Laurence Hardy as Leading Radar Mechanic Sellars
- Sam Kydd as Leading Steward Carslake
- John Singer as Stoker Grey
- Barry Steele as Engine Room Artificer Broughton
- Gerard Heinz as Polish Captain
- Gerik Schjelderup as Norwegian Captain
- Gaston Richer as French Captain
- Andrew Cruickshank as Scott-Brown
- Barry Letts as Raikes
- Kenn Kennedy as Allingham
- Harold Goodwin as ASDIC Operator
- George Curzon as Admiral at party
- Anthony Snell as RN Lieutenant
- Ronald Simpson as RN Captain
- Don Sharp as Lieutenant Commander
- Herbert C. Walton as the Waiter
- Jack Howard as a Survivor
- Russell Waters as ARP Warden
- Harold Jamieson as ARP Warden
- Warwick Ashton as Petty Officer Instructor

== Production ==
=== Casting ===
Although the role of the cowardly officer Bennett was an Australian in the book, the Englishman Donald Sinden was originally screen-tested for the part and the Welshman Stanley Baker was screen-tested for the part of Lockhart. At Jack Hawkins's suggestion and after further screen-tests, the roles were swapped.

Future director Don Sharp had a small role. Virginia McKenna launched her career with her small role and met her first husband, Denholm Elliott, on the set.

=== Filming ===
The film was shot on location in Plymouth Naval Dockyard and the English Channel. Scenes showing the sailors in the water were shot in the open-air water-tank at Denham Studios. Other work was completed at Ealing studios. The brief scenes showing Petty Officer Tallow coming home on leave were filmed in Stepney, London. The crane jibs above the houses in the background were edited in as the docks were over a mile away. Donald Sinden (playing Lockhart) suffered in real life from negative buoyancy, meaning that he was unable to float or swim in water, which was discovered while filming the sequence when the ship Compass Rose is sinking. Co-star Jack Hawkins (playing Ericson) saved him from drowning in Denham's open-air water-tank. Donald Sinden wrote in his memoir:

The evacuation of the ship was the first scene to be shot in the tank, which was about an acre in size, 10 feet deep and contained two giant wave-making machines and an aeroplane propeller which had a fire-hose aimed at it to create the spray. The whole crew were to jump over the side – the great stuntman Frankie Howard from the top of the superstructure. The First Assistant Director, Norman Priggen, came to me and asked 'Can you swim?' 'No' I said. 'OK, you jump from there' and he showed me a position furthest from the bank. I reasoned that it was possibly the shallow end. The night was cold and cast and crew shivered as we waited for the 'sea' to become rough enough: and then 'ACTION!' I ran to the side, climbed up and as I jumped flexed my knees expecting to land in about three feet of water. Down I went... All the others arrived safely at the bank and thank God, Jack heard someone ask 'Where's Donald?' He dived in again and pulled me out just in time. It transpired that the First thought that I had been joking when I said I couldn't swim! But we had to do it another five times, with me in a different position now. For another shot, the leading players were required to swim past the camera in close-up. 'ACTION!' Jack Hawkins swam past – then a long gap – and then Denholm Elliott... 'Donald we didn't see you, lets do it again' said the Director. Jack – a gap – Denholm... I was certainly swimming past but, as the camera operator Chic Waterson spotted – underwater. The only answer was for Frankie Howard (the stuntman) to take an enormous breath and swim breaststroke under the surface, with me lying on his back simulating the crawl. If you look carefully you will see – compared with the others – I am completely out of the water!

In a scene where the corvette’s main 4 inch gun was to be fired at night, the first round used was a simple pyrotechnic load which resulted in a large wad of burning cotton falling unspectacularly out of the gun’s muzzle. As a consequence, and unbeknown to Donald Sinden, who was acting as the officer in charge of the gun, the crew decided to load a live 4 inch round for the second take. Sinden sighted a small light “bobbing on the water” through his binoculars as he gave the command to fire, and this turned out to be a small fishing boat. The live shell missed the boat by an estimated “2 to 3 yards” according to Sinden, narrowly averting disaster.

=== Editing ===
The most traumatic scene in the film occurs after a submarine has caused havoc to the convoy and the ASDIC (sonar detector) reveals that it is beneath a group of British sailors who are struggling in the water, hoping to be rescued. Ericson, faced with an appalling choice, drops the depth charges that will destroy the enemy but will also kill his countrymen. Yet for all his professionalism he is a human being and he later gets paralytically drunk and bares his feelings to Lockhart. Jack Hawkins, personally moved by the situation, delivered a fitting emotional performance and at the end of the scene tears were rolling down his face. Two days later, after seeing it cut together, Michael Balcon asked Charles Frend to re-shoot it with Hawkins keeping a grip on himself. It was played that way and Balcon pronounced it absolutely perfect. Then two days later, after another viewing, it was decided that a little emotion was needed after all; the scene was re-shot with just an odd tear or two and again the verdict was that it was now dead right. Hawkins was amused to note that in the final version of the film, the original first take was used.

In his second autobiography, Donald Sinden wrote:

The editor, Peter Tanner, showed me a clip of film in which the Compass Rose was sailing from left to right across the screen. 'Now, that is exactly the shot I need to show the ship returning to Liverpool – but the ship is going the wrong way.' I asked him what he meant and he said 'The eye of the viewer accepts anything travelling from left to right as going away from home, anything going from right to left is returning home. What I shall do is just reverse this piece of film and the ship will be going in the required direction'.

=== Ships ===
Compass Rose was portrayed by the Flower-class corvette HMS Coreopsis (K32). The Admiralty had disposed of all its wartime corvettes, but Coreopsis was located in Malta by one of the film's technical advisers, Capt. Jack Broome DSC RN (who had been escort commander of the ill-fated Convoy PQ 17). Coreopsis had been loaned to the Hellenic Navy and renamed Kriezis, and was awaiting a tow back to England and the breaker's yard. Compass Rose carries the pennant number "K49", which was in reality the number of HMS Crocus. Saltash Castle was portrayed by Castle-class corvette HMS Portchester Castle, pennant F362, as in the film. Although she had been paid off in 1947, she was held in reserve until broken up in 1958 and so could be made available for use in the film.

In the book, the new ship which replaced Compass Rose was a fictional River-class frigate HMS Saltash. These ships were significantly larger than the Castle-class corvettes, but had been paid off or sold abroad when the film was made. (In 1954 a recommissioned Royal Canadian Navy River-class frigate HMCS New Glasgow was made available to play the fictional HMS Rockhampton in the John Wayne film The Sea Chase.) In the film, when boarding their new ship, the characters of Ericson and Lockhart remark that neither of them have heard of a castle in Saltash – in reality there is no such thing, although there are a number of fortifications in the local area.

Both ships were based in Plymouth, with Plymouth Sound standing in for the River Mersey. The scenes of the ships at sea were filmed in the English Channel just out of sight of land. These coastal waters and a summer shooting schedule meant that the sea was generally too calm to portray conditions on the Atlantic in winter, so the ships were taken to the Portland Race. Although only a couple of miles offshore, a number of conflicting tidal streams and a sandbank provide predictable, albeit often dangerous, large waves and a disturbed sea. Ships usually deliberately avoid the Portland Race but Compass Rose was taken straight through during the peak of the tide to get the required shots.

== Reception ==
=== Box office ===
It was the most successful film at the British box office in 1953 and caused Jack Hawkins to be voted the most popular star with British audiences.

Most British war films of this era performed poorly at the US box office but this was one of the few to buck the trend. It earned £215,000 (approximately £4.9million by 2013 standards) in the United States, then a high figure for British films (Variety reported this figure at US$600,000).

=== Critical ===
Variety called it "a picture of dramatic intensity".

== Legacy ==
In 1956, according to the documentary Fifties British War Films: Days of Glory, when Elstree Studios was being sold to the BBC, Sir Michael Balcon was asked what had been his greatest achievement during his tenure. He replied "I think perhaps The Cruel Sea because when we saw that for the first time, we realised that we really had brought it off. It seemed to just gel and be absolutely right. Sometimes you don't get that feeling, but with that one we all did". The film is ranked number 75 on the British Film Institute's list of the top 100 British films.

The film has cult-like status within the Royal Navy, with the mess deck tradition of "Cruel Sea Night" in which new mess joiners will watch the film whilst wearing life jackets and sprayed with water whenever HMS Compass Rose hits heavy weather or certain lines such as "Snorkers!" is said. This is a rite of passage for many members of the Royal Navy and is held with as high regard as crossing the line. On the review aggregator website Rotten Tomatoes, 100% of 6 critics' reviews are positive.

Halliwell's Film Guide described the film as a "competent transcription of a bestselling book, cleanly produced and acted".

== See also ==
- BFI Top 100 British films
- Das Boot
- Greyhound
