= Convoy PQ 17 =

Allied World War II convoy in the Arctic Ocean

- Part of Arctic naval operations of the Second World War
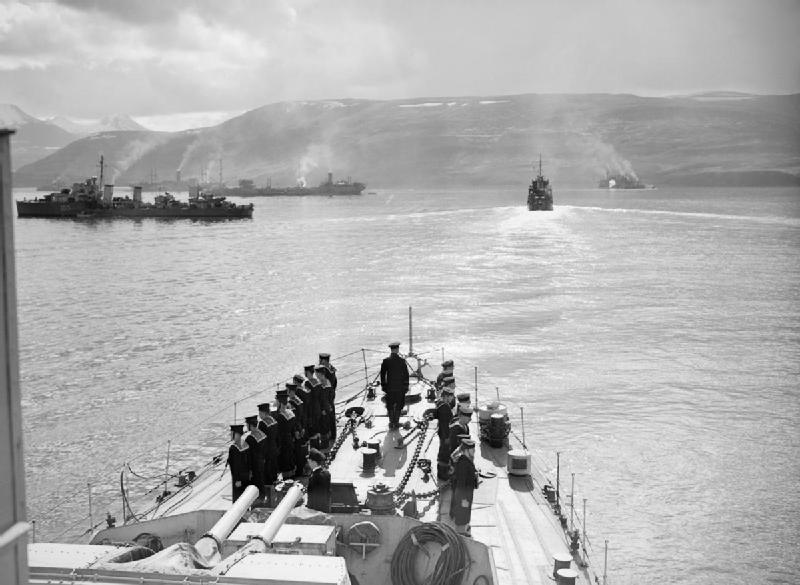
- Escorts and merchant ships at Hvalfjörður May 1942 before the sailing of Convoy PQ 17.
Date	27 June – 10 July 1942
Location	Arctic Ocean
Result	German victory

Belligerents
United Kingdom; United States; Soviet Union; Netherlands; Panama	Germany

Commanders and leaders
Dudley Pound; John Tovey; Louis Hamilton; Jack Broome; John Dowding	Erich Raeder; Karl Dönitz; Hans-Jürgen Stumpff

Strength
35 merchant ships; Close escort: 6 destroyers; 11 escort vessels; 2 anti-aircraft ships; Covering forces: 1 aircraft carrier; 2 battleships; 6 cruisers; 13 destroyers	1 battleship; 3 cruisers; 12 destroyers; 11 U-boats; 33 torpedo-bombers; 6 bombers

Casualties and losses
153 merchant seamen killed; 24 merchant ships sunk; 3,350 vehicles; 210 aircraft; 430 tanks; 99,316 GRT general cargo	5 aircraft

Convoy PQ 17 (27 June – 10 July 1942) was an Allied Arctic convoy during the Second World War. The convoy was the first large joint Anglo–American naval operation under British command. The ships sailed from Hvalfjörður, Iceland, for the Arkhangelsk in the Soviet Union. The convoy was located by German forces on 1 July, shadowed and attacked.

The First Sea Lord, Admiral Sir Dudley Pound was told that German ships, including the German battleship Tirpitz, were moving to intercept the convoy. He ordered the cruiser cover and the destroyers of the close escort to concentrate on the Home Fleet heavy cover to the west and instructed the convoy to scatter. The destruction wrought by aircraft and U-boats led to the German ship operation being cancelled as superfluous on 5 July.

Of the 35 ships, only eleven reached their destination, delivering 70,000 long tons (71,000 t) of cargo. The convoy disaster demonstrated the difficulty of sending Arctic convoys to the Soviet Union, during the summer, with its relatively milder weather and the midnight sun, that the Admiralty had frequently warned the War Cabinet.

== Background ==
=== Lend-lease ===
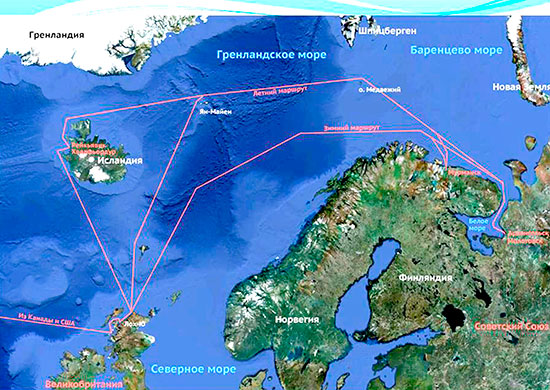
Russian map showing Arctic convoy routes from Britain and Iceland, past Norway to the Barents Sea and northern Russian ports

After Operation Barbarossa, the German invasion of the USSR, began on 22 June 1941, the UK and USSR signed an agreement in July that they would "render each other assistance and support of all kinds in the present war against Hitlerite Germany". Before September 1941 the British had dispatched 450 aircraft, 22,000 long tons (22,000 t) of rubber, 3,000,000 pairs of boots and stocks of tin, aluminium, jute, lead and wool. In September British and US representatives travelled to Moscow to study Soviet requirements and their ability to meet them. The representatives of the three countries drew up a protocol in October 1941 to last until June 1942 and to agree new protocols to operate from 1 July to 30 June of each following year until the end of Lend-Lease. The protocol listed supplies, monthly rates of delivery and totals for the period.

The first protocol specified the supplies to be sent but not the ships to move them. The USSR turned out to lack the ships and escorts and the British and Americans, who had made a commitment to "help with the delivery", undertook to deliver the supplies for want of an alternative. The main Soviet need in 1941 was military equipment to replace losses because, at the time of the negotiations, two large aircraft factories were being moved east from Leningrad and two more from Ukraine. It would take at least eight months to resume production, until when, aircraft output would fall from 80 to 30 aircraft per day. Britain and the US undertook to send 400 aircraft a month, at a ratio of three bombers to one fighter (later reversed), 500 tanks a month and 300 Bren gun carriers. The Anglo-Americans also undertook to send 42,000 long tons (43,000 t) of aluminium and 3,862 machine tools, with sundry raw materials, food and medical supplies.

=== British grand strategy ===
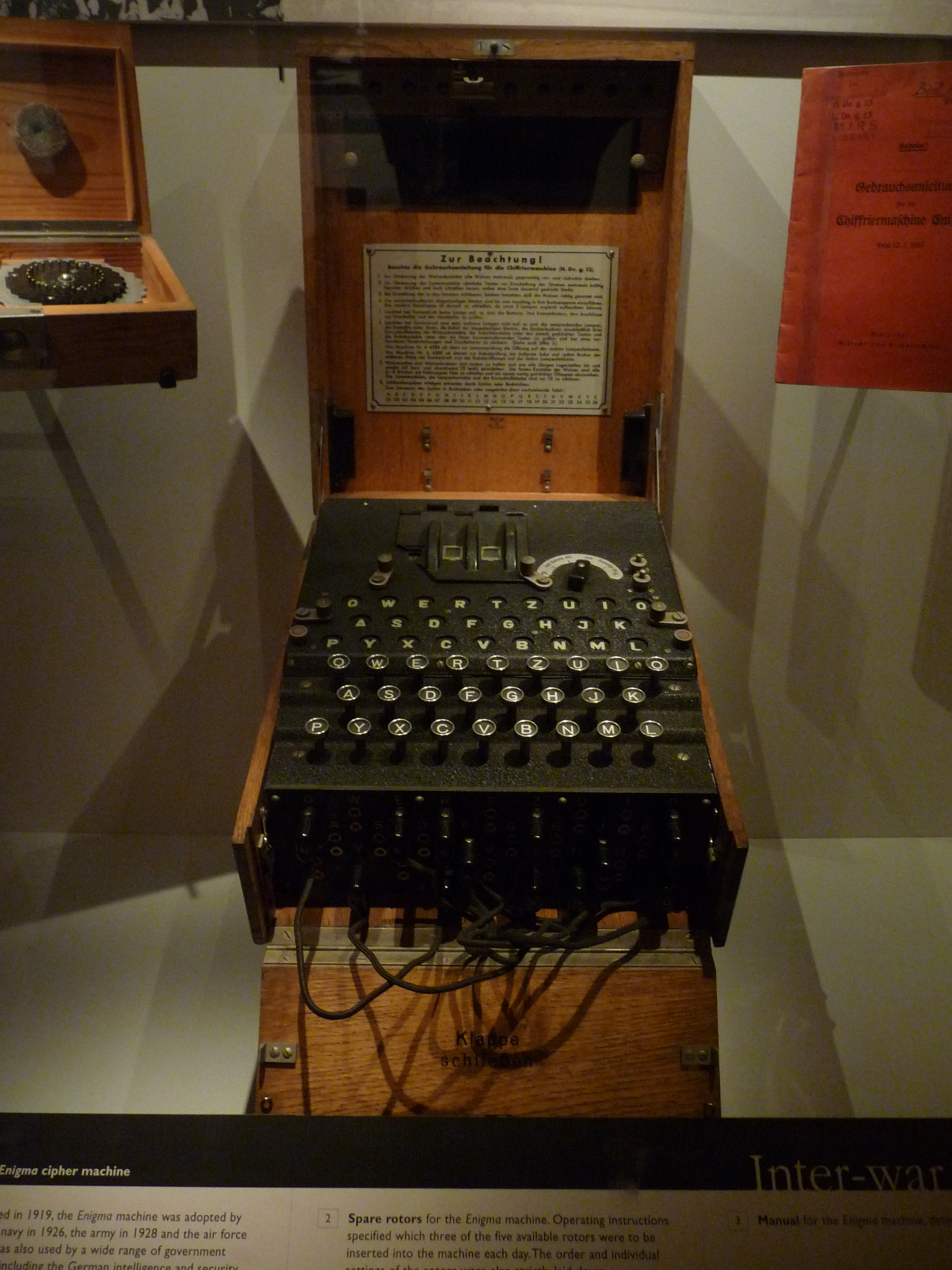
An Enigma coding machine

The growing German air strength in Norway and increasing losses to convoys and their escorts, led Rear-Admiral Stuart Bonham Carter, commander of the 18th Cruiser Squadron, Admiral Sir John Tovey, Commander in Chief Home Fleet and Admiral Sir Dudley Pound the First Sea Lord, the professional head of the Royal Navy, unanimously to advocate the suspension of Arctic convoys during the summer months.

==== Bletchley Park ====
The British Government Code and Cypher School (GC&CS) based at Bletchley Park housed a small industry of code-breakers and traffic analysts. By June 1941, the German Enigma machine Home Waters (Heimish) settings used by surface ships and U-boats could quickly be read. On 1 February 1942, the Enigma machines used in U-boats in the Atlantic and Mediterranean were changed but German ships and the U-boats in Arctic waters continued with the older Heimish (Hydra from 1942, Dolphin to the British). By mid-1941, British Y-stations were able to receive and read Luftwaffe W/T transmissions and give advance warning of Luftwaffe operations. In 1941, naval Headache personnel with receivers to eavesdrop on Luftwaffe wireless transmissions were embarked on warships.

==== B-Dienst ====
The rival German Beobachtungsdienst (B-Dienst, Observation Service) of the Kriegsmarine Marinenachrichtendienst (MND, Naval Intelligence Service) had broken several Admiralty codes and cyphers by 1939, which were used to help Kriegsmarine ships elude British forces and provide opportunities for surprise attacks. From June to August 1940, six British submarines were sunk in the Skaggerak using information gleaned from British wireless signals. In 1941, B-Dienst read signals from the Commander in Chief Western Approaches informing convoys of areas patrolled by U-boats, enabling the submarines to move into "safe" zones. B-Dienst had broken Naval Cypher No 3 in February 1942 and by March was reading up to 80 per cent of the traffic, which continued until 15 December 1943. By coincidence, the British lost access to the Shark cypher and had no information to send in Cypher No 3 which might compromise Ultra. In early September, Finnish Radio Intelligence deciphered a Soviet Air Force transmission which divulged the convoy itinerary and forwarded it to the Germans.

=== Arctic Ocean ===
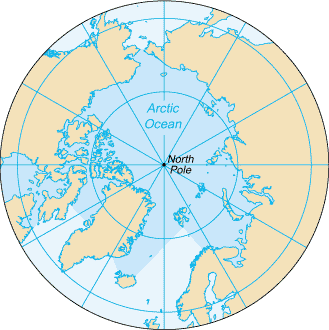
Diagram of the Arctic Ocean

Between Greenland and Norway are some of the most stormy waters of the world's oceans, 890 mi (1,440 km) of water under gales full of snow, sleet and hail. The cold Arctic water is met by the Gulf Stream, warm water from the Gulf of Mexico, which becomes the North Atlantic Drift. Arriving at the south-west of England the drift moves between Scotland and Iceland; north of Norway the drift splits. One stream bears north of Bear Island to Svalbard and a southern stream follows the coast of Murmansk into the Barents Sea. The mingling of cold Arctic water and warmer water of higher salinity generates thick banks of fog for convoys to hide in, but the waters drastically reduced the effectiveness of ASDIC as U-boats moved in waters of differing temperatures and density.

In winter, polar ice can form as far south as 50 mi (80 km) off the North Cape and in summer it can recede to Svalbard. The area is in perpetual darkness in winter and permanent daylight in the summer and can make air reconnaissance almost impossible. Around the North Cape and in the Barents Sea the sea temperature rarely rises about 4° Celsius and a man in the water will die unless rescued immediately. The cold water and air makes spray freeze on the superstructure of ships, which has to be removed quickly to avoid the ship becoming top-heavy. Conditions in U-boats were, if anything, worse than the boats having to submerge in warmer water to rid the superstructure of ice. Crewmen on watch were exposed to the elements, oil lost its fluidity, nuts froze and sheared off. Heaters in the hull were too demanding of current to be run continuously.

=== Arctic convoys ===
A convoy was defined as at least one merchant ship sailing under the protection of at least one warship. At first the British had intended to run convoys to Russia on a forty-day cycle (the number of days between convoy departures) during the winter of 1941–1942 but this was shortened to a ten-day cycle. The round trip to Murmansk for warships was three weeks and each convoy needed a cruiser and two destroyers, which severely depleted the Home Fleet. Convoys left port and rendezvoused with the escorts at sea. A cruiser provided distant cover from a position to the west of Bear Island. Air support was limited to 330 Squadron and 269 Squadron, RAF Coastal Command from Iceland, with some help from anti-submarine patrols from Sullom Voe, in Shetland, along the coast of Norway. Anti-submarine trawlers escorted the convoys on the first part of the outbound journey. Built for Arctic conditions, the trawlers were coal-burning ships with sufficient endurance. The trawlers were commanded by their peacetime crews and captains with the rank of Skipper, Royal Naval Reserve (RNR), who were used to Arctic conditions, supplemented by anti-submarine specialists of the Royal Naval Volunteer Reserve (RNVR). British minesweepers based at Arkhangelsk met the convoys to join the escort for the remainder of the voyage.

By late 1941, the convoy system used in the Atlantic had been established on the Arctic run; a convoy commodore ensured that the ships' masters and signals officers attended a briefing to make arrangements for the management of the convoy, which sailed in a formation of long rows of short columns. The commodore was usually a retired naval officer or from the Royal Naval Reserve and would be aboard one of the merchant ships (identified by a white pendant with a blue cross). The commodore was assisted by a Naval signals party of four men, who used lamps, semaphore flags and telescopes to pass signals in code. The codebooks were carried in a weighted bag which was to be dumped overboard to prevent capture. In large convoys, the commodore was assisted by vice- and rear-commodores with whom he directed the speed, course and zig-zagging of the merchant ships and liaised with the escort commander.

In October 1941, the Prime Minister, Winston Churchill, made a commitment to send a convoy to the Arctic ports of the USSR every ten days and to deliver 1,200 tanks a month from July 1942 to January 1943, followed by 2,000 tanks and another 3,600 aircraft in excess of those already promised. (Note: In October 1941, the unloading capacity of Arkhangelsk was 300,000 long tons (300,000 t), Vladivostok (Pacific Route) 140,000 long tons (140,000 t) and 60,000 long tons (61,000 t) in the Persian Gulf (for the Persian Corridor route) ports.) The first convoy was due at Murmansk around 12 October and the next convoy was to depart Iceland on 22 October. A motley of British, Allied and neutral shipping, loaded with military stores and raw materials for the Soviet war effort would be assembled at Hvalfjörður (Hvalfiord) in Iceland, convenient for ships from both sides of the Atlantic.

By the end of 1941, 187 Matilda II and 249 Valentine tanks had been delivered, comprising 25 per cent of the medium-heavy tanks in the Red Army and 30 to 40 per cent of the medium-heavy tanks defending Moscow. In December 1941, 16 per cent of the fighters defending Moscow were Hawker Hurricanes and Curtiss Tomahawks from Britain; by 1 January 1942, 96 Hurricane fighters were flying in the Soviet Air Forces (Voyenno-Vozdushnye Sily, VVS). The British supplied radar apparatus, machine tools, ASDIC and other commodities. During the summer months, convoys went as far north as 75 N latitude then south into the Barents Sea and to the ports of Murmansk in the Kola Inlet and Arkhangelsk in the White Sea. In winter, due to the polar ice expanding southwards, the convoy route ran closer to Norway. The voyage was between 1,400 and 2,000 nmi (2,600 and 3,700 km; 1,600 and 2,300 mi) each way, taking at least three weeks for a round trip.

== Prelude ==
=== British plan ===
British naval intelligence in June reported Unternehmen Rösselsprung (Operation Knight's Move), the German plan to use their big ships to attack the next convoy, east of Bear Island. German forces would operate close to the Norwegian coast, with support of shore-based air reconnaissance and striking forces, with a screen of U-boats in the channels between Svalbard and Norway. Allied covering forces would be without air support, 1,000 mi (1,600 km) from their base and with the destroyers too short on fuel to escort a damaged ship to harbour.

The Admiralty issued instructions on 27 June, which allowed the convoy to be turned back, temporarily to shorten the distance to the nearest Allied base. German surface movements took place later than expected, making these instructions unnecessary. The Admiralty also stated that the safety of the convoy from surface attack westward of Bear Island depended on Allied surface forces, while to the eastward it was to be provided by Allied submarines. The convoy's cruiser covering force was not to go east of Bear Island, unless the convoy was threatened by the presence of a surface force which the cruiser force could fight, nor to go beyond 25° East under any circumstances, later modified to allow them to go beyond the line if Tirpitz was not in the area.

A decoy convoy, Force X, part of Operation ES, was also organised to divert enemy forces, consisting of the First Minelaying Squadron and four colliers, escorted by the light cruisers HMS Sirius and HMS Curacoa, five destroyers and several trawlers. This diversionary force assembled at Scapa Flow for a week, sailing two days after the convoy. German reconnaissance of Scapa during the period of assembly failed to notice the diversion, which was also not sighted on its passage. The operation was repeated on 1 July, again without success. On 26 June the Admiralty took the opportunity to pass the westbound Convoy QP 13, in conjunction with Convoy PQ 17. The former was made up of returning merchant ships from Arkhangelsk, with some ships from Murmansk. It consisted of thirty-five ships and was escorted by five destroyers, three corvettes, an anti-aircraft ship, three minesweepers, two trawlers and to the Bear Island area, a submarine. It was sighted by German aircraft on 30 June and 2 July. Convoy QP 13 was not attacked, since the German tactic was to concentrate on eastbound (laden) convoys, rather than westbound convoys in ballast.

A new ice reconnaissance flown on 3 July found the passage north of Bear Island had widened. The Admiralty suggested the convoy should pass at least 50 nmi (93 km; 58 mi) north of it. The senior officer of the escort (SOE), Commander Jack Broome, preferred to stay in the low visibility on the original route and to make ground to the eastward. Rear-Admiral Louis Hamilton, in command of the cruiser squadron, later decided that a more northerly route was necessary, ordered the SOE to alter course, to pass 70 nmi (130 km; 81 mi) north of Bear Island and later on to open to 400 nmi (740 km; 460 mi) from Banak.

=== Escorts ===
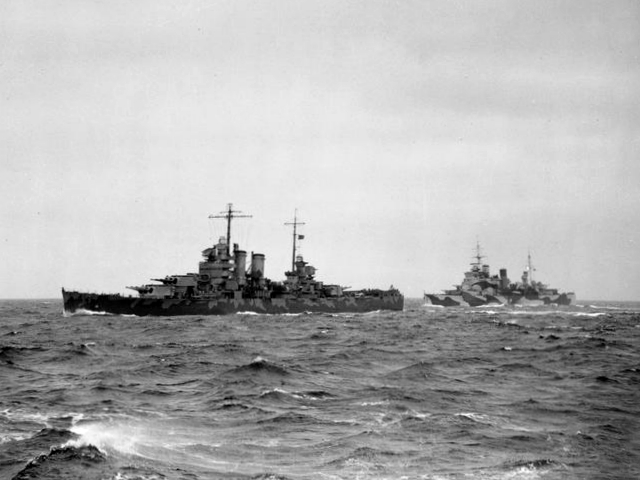
USS Wichita and HMS London, part of the cruiser covering force.

The close escort for Convoy PQ 17 was the First Escort Group (EG1, SOE Jack Broome) and included the anti-aircraft auxiliary cruisers HMS Palomares and HMS Pozarica, the destroyers HMS Keppel, Fury, Leamington, Ledbury, Offa and Wilton, the corvettes, minesweepers or armed trawlers HMS Lotus, Poppy, La Malouine and HMS Dianella, the Halcyon-class minesweepers HMS Halcyon, Salamander and Britomart and the anti-submarine trawlers HMT Lord Middleton, Lord Austin, Ayrshire and Northern Gem. Distant cover came from the 1st Cruiser Squadron (CS1, Hamilton), consisting of the British cruisers HMS London (flagship) and Norfolk, the American cruisers USS Wichita and Tuscaloosa and four destroyers, two American and two British. As distant cover, Home Fleet battleships cruised at about 200 nmi (370 km; 230 mi) to the west.

A second heavy covering force, under the command of Admiral John Tovey, was made up of the aircraft carrier HMS Victorious, the battleship HMS Duke of York (flagship), the cruisers HMS Cumberland and Nigeria, the US battleship Washington and nine destroyers. As the convoy sailed, the covering forces were moving into position. CS1 left Seidisfjord in the night of 30 June/1 July and arrived in a covering position north of the convoy on 2 July. The cruisers were not sighted by the Germans until late on 3 July then the heavy covering force was shadowed for a short period while north-east of Iceland on 1 July, while the cruiser screen was refuelling at Seidisfjord. It was shadowed for a short period early on 3 July, while in a covering position south of the convoy.

Later that day, course was altered northwards to cross the convoy's track and to reach a position north-west of Bear Island. This would place Victorious within air striking range of the convoy on the morning of 4 July. This was intended to be at the same time at which a surface attack was expected. While en route to the new covering area, the force was joined by HMS Manchester and Eclipse from Spitzbergen. Air reconnaissance of Norwegian harbours had been hindered by weather but information showed German heavy units were probably moving northwards and an air photograph of Trondheim late on 3 July showed that Tirpitz and Hipper were absent. The flying boat patrol and the two lines of submarines between North Cape and Bear Island were adjusted to cover the line of approach to the convoy as it moved eastwards. In view of the uncertainty of the two German ships' positions, Hamilton decided to continue to provide close cover with the cruiser squadron and to pass east of Bear Island.

=== Kriegsmarine ===
Against Convoy PQ 17 the Kriegsmarine prepared wolfpack Eisteufel (Ice Devil), to intercept the convoy; three U-boats were in a patrol line north of the Denmark Strait to give advance warning and another five further north of Jan Mayen Island. The Kriegsmarine also had two battle groups in Norwegian ports, Force I (Drontheim-Gruppe) consisting of the battleship Tirpitz, the cruiser Hipper and the destroyers Karl Galster, Friedrich Ihn, Hans Lody, Theodor Riedel with the torpedo boats T 7 and T 15. Force II (Narvik-Gruppe) Lützow, Scheer and the destroyers Z24, Z27, Z28, Z29 and Z30, ready to carry out a surface attack on the convoy. This was orchestrated as a complex two-stage operation codenamed Unternehmen Rösselsprung (Operation Knight's Move); the force was the strongest yet assembled for a convoy attack but was hampered by an unwieldy chain of command, with the authority to attack resting with Hitler and a contradictory mission statement; the forces were instructed to attack and destroy the convoy and also to avoid any action that would lead to damage to the capital ships, particularly Tirpitz.

=== Luftflotte 5 ===
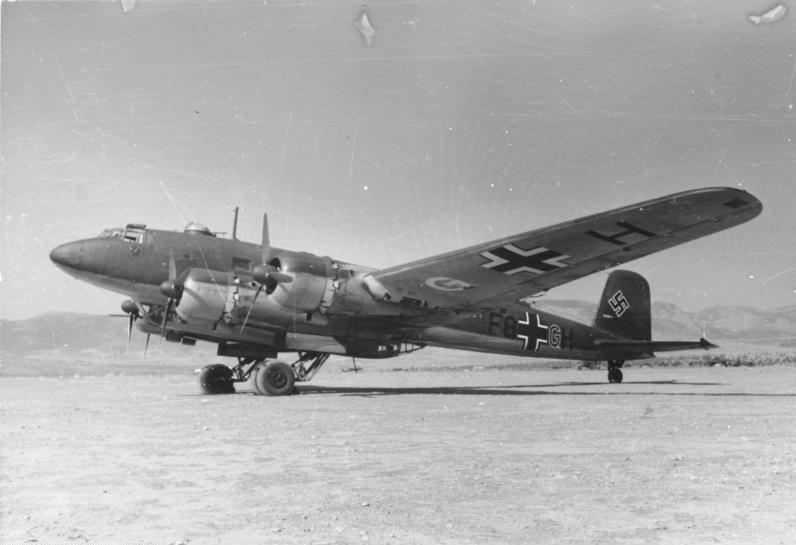
A Focke-Wulf Fw 200 Kondor of KG 40

In mid-1941, Luftflotte 5 (Air Fleet 5) had been re-organised for Operation Barbarossa with Luftgau Norwegen (Air Region Norway) headquartered in Oslo. Fliegerführer Stavanger (Air Commander Stavanger) the centre and north of Norway, Jagdfliegerführer Norwegen (Fighter Leader Norway) commanded the fighter force and Fliegerführer Kerkenes (Oberst [colonel] Andreas Nielsen) in the far north had airfields at Kirkenes and Banak. The Air Fleet had 180 aircraft, sixty of which were reserved for operations on the Karelian Front against the Red Army. The distance from Banak to Arkhangelsk was 560 mi (900 km) and Fliegerführer Kerkenes had only ten Junkers Ju 88 bombers of Kampfgeschwader 30, thirty Junkers Ju 87 Stuka dive-bombers, ten Messerschmitt Bf 109 fighters of Jagdgeschwader 77, five Messerschmitt Bf 110 heavy fighters of Zerstörergeschwader 76, ten reconnaissance aircraft and an anti-aircraft battalion.

Sixty aircraft were far from adequate in such a climate and terrain where "there is no favourable season for operations". The emphasis of air operations changed from army support to anti-shipping operations as Allied Arctic convoys became more frequent. Hubert Schmundt, the Admiral Nordmeer noted gloomily on 22 December 1941 that the number of long-range reconnaissance aircraft was exiguous and from 1 to 15 December only two Ju 88 sorties had been possible. After the Lofoten Raids, Schmundt wanted Luftflotte 5 to transfer aircraft to northern Norway but its commander, Generaloberst Hans-Jürgen Stumpff, was reluctant to deplete the defences of western Norway. Despite this some air units were transferred, a catapult ship (Katapultschiff), MS Schwabenland, was sent to northern Norway and Heinkel He 115 floatplane torpedo-bombers, of Küstenfliegergruppe 1./406 was transferred to Sola. By the end of 1941, III Gruppe, KG 30 had been transferred to Norway and in the new year, another Staffel of Focke-Wulf Fw 200 Kondors from Kampfgeschwader 40 (KG 40) had arrived. Luftflotte 5 was also expected to receive a Gruppe comprising three Staffeln of Heinkel He 111 torpedo-bombers.

The aircraft of Luftflotte 5 had to contend with the growth of the Soviet Air Force at the terminus of the Arctic sea route. During Convoy PQ 16, German attacks faded away during 27 May due to the arrival of Soviet destroyers and the arrival of Soviet bombers overhead; when the convoy came into range on 29 May, Soviet fighters began escort sorties. The rise on the number of opposing aircraft led to Germans claiming 162 aircraft shot down in May, 113 being Hurricanes provided from Britain. On 28 May the Luftwaffe claimed 22 aircraft for no loss. The German claims were exaggerated but the Luftwaffe airfields at Petsamo, Kirkenes and Banak began to receive frequent attacks by Soviet bombers and fighters, often timed to ground the Luftwaffe during convoy operations. On 29 May, the Soviets tried to jam Luftflotte 5 wireless frequencies and raided Kirkenes with small formations of aircraft or solo attacks. The Soviet raids stretched the resources of Luftflotte 5 and increased losses on raids against Murmansk.

No convoys were spotted during June and the weather was too bad for convoy operations. Training in the Goldene Zange (Golden Comb) tactic, first used against Convoy PQ 16, continued. By early June there were 264 aircraft available, a strike force of 103 Ju 88 bombers, 42 He 111 torpedo-bombers and 30 Ju 87 Stuka dive-bombers, eight FW 200 Kondor and 22 Ju 88s for long-range reconnaissance, 44 Bv 138 flying boats for shorter-range reconnaissance and fifteen He 115 floatplanes for general use.

==== Air-sea rescue ====
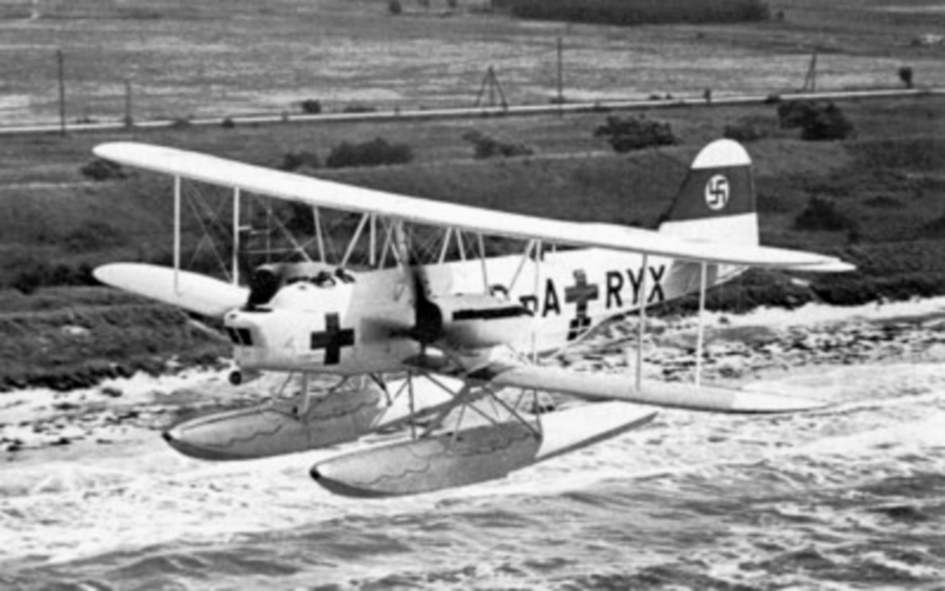
Example of a Heinkel He 59 search and rescue aircraft (1940)

The Luftwaffe Sea Rescue Service (Seenotdienst) along with the Kriegsmarine, the Norwegian Society for Sea Rescue (RS) and ships on passage, recovered aircrew and shipwrecked sailors. The service comprised Seenotbereich VIII at Stavanger, covering Bergen and Trondheim with Seenotbereich IX at Kirkenes for Tromsø, Billefjord and Kirkenes. Co-operation was as important in rescues as it was in anti-shipping operations if people were to be saved before they succumbed to the climate and severe weather. The sea rescue aircraft comprised Heinkel He 59 floatplanes, Dornier Do 18 and Dornier Do 24 seaplanes. Oberkommando der Luftwaffe (OKL, the high command of the Luftwaffe) was not able to increase the number of search and rescue aircraft in Norway, due to a general shortage of aircraft and crews, despite Stumpff pointing out that coming down in such cold waters required extremely swift recovery and that his crews "must be given a chance of rescue" or morale could not be maintained.

== Voyage ==
USS Wainwright broke up an air attack on the convoy on 4 July.

The convoy sailed from Hvalfjörður on 27 June, John Dowding being the convoy commodore. With the 34 merchant ships, the oiler RFA Gray Ranger for the escort and the rescue ships Rathlin, Zamalek, and Zaafaran sailed with the convoy. The escort was made up of six destroyers, four corvettes, three minesweepers, four trawlers, two anti-aircraft ships and two submarines. The route was longer than earlier convoys, since the ice allowed for a passage north of Bear Island and an evasive detour in the Barents Sea. All the convoy was bound for Arkhangelsk, because recent air attacks had destroyed most of Murmansk. One ship suffered mechanical failure just out of port and was forced to turn back. SS Exford, turned back after suffering ice damage.

Part of the convoy ran into drifting ice in thick weather whilst in the Denmark Strait. Two merchant ships were damaged and had to turn back; Gray Ranger was also damaged and her speed reduced to 8 kn (15 km/h; 9.2 mph). Since it was doubtful if she could face heavy weather, it was decided to transfer her to the fuelling position north-east of Jan Mayen in exchange for the RFA Aldersdale. Shortly after Convoy PQ 17 sailed it was sighted and tracked by U-456 and shadowed continuously, except for a few short intervals in fog. This was augmented by Luftwaffe BV 138 flying boats on 1 July. On 2 July, the convoy sighted the reciprocal Convoy QP 13. Convoy PQ 17 was attacked by nine torpedo aircraft later that day and one aircraft was shot down. At 13:00 on 3 July, the Convoy PQ 17 destroyer screen was steering east to pass between Bear Island and Spitsbergen.

On the morning of 4 July, a Heinkel He 115, from Küstenfliegergruppe 906, torpedoed the Liberty ship SS Christopher Newport, around 35 nmi (40 mi; 65 km) north-east of Bear Island, at 75°49′N 22°15′E. The submarine HMS P-614 attempted to scuttle her but she remained afloat; German submarine U-457 sank the ship at 08:08.There was an abortive attack by six bombers in the evening. USS Wainwright broke up an air attack on the convoy the same day. Later that evening, an attack by 25 torpedo bombers took place, sinking SS William Hooper.

== Dispersal ==
Excerpts of signals between the Admiralty (ADMY) and the First Cruiser Squadron (CS1)
Time	From	To	Message
21:11	ADMY	CS1	Cruiser Force withdraw to the westward at high speed.
21:23	ADMY	CS1	Owing to threat from surface ships, convoy is to disperse and proceed to Russian ports.
21:36	ADMY	CS1	Convoy is to scatter.

At 12:30 on 4 July, the Admiralty gave Hamilton permission to proceed east of 25° east, should the situation demand, unless contrary orders were received from Tovey. This was a reversal of previous orders and as no information in Tovey's possession justified this change, Hamilton was ordered to withdraw when the convoy was east of 25° east or earlier at his discretion, unless the Admiralty assured him Tirpitz would not be met. At 18:58 the Admiralty informed Hamilton that more information was expected shortly, instructing him to remain with the convoy pending further instructions. At 21:11, the Admiralty sent a message prefixed "Most Immediate" ordering Hamilton to withdraw westwards at high speed. This was due to U-boat information, a fact not shared with Hamilton. At 21:23, the Admiralty, in a message prefixed "Immediate", ordered the convoy to disperse and proceed to Russian ports independently owing to threat from surface ships. At 21:36, the Admiralty sent another "Most Immediate" message, ordering the convoy to scatter. (Note: This latter signal was intended merely as a correction of technical wording from "disperse" to "scatter" but this was not known at the time. The order to scatter was only used under immediate threat of surface attack. Detailed instructions in each ship's signal book laid down the actions that were to be taken by each ship on receipt of this order.)

Luftwaffe and Kriegsmarine aircraft Northern Norway, June 1942
Ju 88	Bomber	103
He 111	Bomber	42
He 115	Floatplane	15
Ju 87	Dive bomber	30
Ju 88; FW 200; BV 138	Reconnaissance	74
Total		264

Hamilton, Broome and Dowding took these signals to indicate that an attack by Tirpitz was imminent. The convoy was immediately ordered to scatter, with the escorting destroyers ordered to join the cruiser force and the merchantmen to proceed independently. Winston Churchill later speculated that the Admiralty's decision and orders would not have been so vehement had only British warships been concerned but the idea the first joint Anglo-American operation under British command might involve the destruction of American as well as British units may well have influenced the decisions of Pound. The Allied cruiser squadron was already beyond the standing orders set by the Admiralty and if no new orders had gone out, the cruisers would have had to withdraw some time afterwards in any case. The earlier cruiser movement did not influence the tactical situation but in light of later knowledge, the decision was deemed precipitate.

Unbeknownst to the escort and convoy commanders, the Tirpitz battlegroup was not advancing toward the convoy or anywhere near. Tirpitz had left Trondheim on 2 July to the port of Vestfjord; the next day, the Kriegsmarine Commander-in-Chief, Admiral Erich Raeder, received permission to move Tirpitz to Altenfjord to join the ships there. Prior to issuing the orders, Pound visited Whitehall and consulted an intelligence officer, Lieutenant Commander Norman Denning, to confirm that Tirpitz had left Altentfjord. Though Denning did not know if it was still there he did explain that his sources would have confirmed if the ship had or was about to put to sea. It was not until several hours after Pound's orders that Tirpitz was shown still to be anchored at Altenfjord. Tirpitz's battlegroup sailed on July 5 but the operation by surface ships to attack the convoy was cancelled and the ships returned to Altenfjord that day.

== Convoy losses ==
Track of Convoy PQ 17, showing approximate positions of sinkings

When the order to scatter the convoy was received, it had covered more than half of its route and lost three ships. The consequences for the merchantmen were dire; the ships were spread over a wide area, stripped of mutual protection and their trained escort. As the larger escort vessels retreated from the suspected German surface force, messages on Merchant Navy wavelengths began to be received by the destroyers: "Am being bombed by a large number of planes", "On fire in the ice", "Abandoning ship", "Six U-boats approaching on the surface". With the majority of the escorts ordered to return to Scapa Flow, only the close escort of anti-aircraft auxiliaries, corvettes, minesweepers and armed trawlers was left to protect the scattered ships.

On 5 July, six merchantmen, including SS Fairfield City and SS Daniel Morgan were sunk by the Luftwaffe and six more by four U-boats. Among the losses that day were SS Pan Kraft, Washington, Carlton, Honomu, the Commodore's flagship River Afton, Empire Byron and Peter Kerr. (Kerr was abandoned after a fire got out of control.) SS Paulus Potter had been abandoned by her crew after an aerial attack on 5 July; the ship was boarded by sailors from U-255 on 13 July; after taking the ship's documents and flag, Kapitänleutnant Reinhart Reche sank Potter with a torpedo.

On 6 July, SS Pan Atlantic was sunk by the Luftwaffe and SS John Witherspoon by U-255. From 7 to 8 July, five more ships were sunk (two by U-255), including SS Olapana and SS Alcoa Ranger. The remaining escorts withdrew into the Arctic Ocean on 9 July but the merchant ships suffered no more that day. The last losses were SS Hoosier and SS El Capitan on 10 July. The Luftwaffe flew over 200 sorties and lost only five aircraft in exchange for the eight merchantmen.

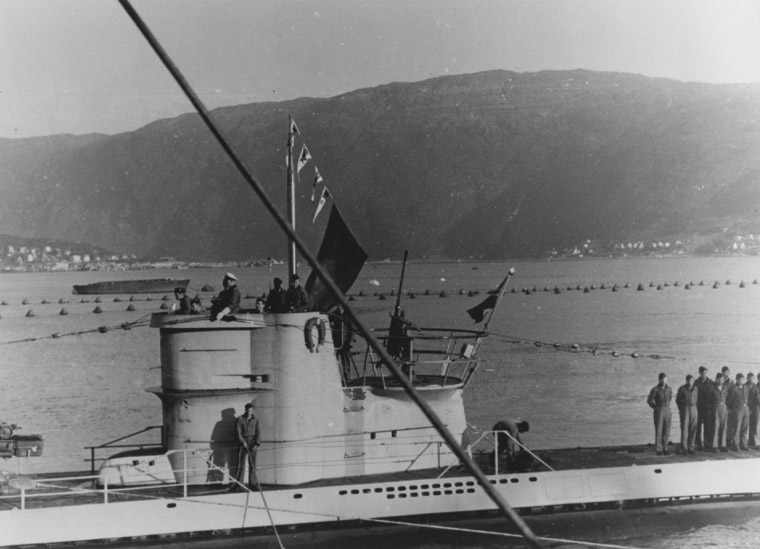
U-255 after the attacks on Convoy PQ 17, flying four victory pennants and the captured flag of the merchant ship SS Paulus Potter

On receiving the third order to scatter on 4 July 1942, Lieutenant Leo Gradwell RNVR, commanding the anti-submarine trawler HMS Ayrshire, did not want to head for Arkhangelsk and led his convoy of Ayrshire and Troubador, Ironclad and Silver Sword north. On reaching the Arctic ice, the convoy pushed into it, then stopped engines and banked their fires. The crews used white paint from Troubador, covered the decks with white linen and arranged the Sherman tanks on the merchant vessels' decks into a defensive formation, with loaded main guns. After a period of waiting and having evaded Luftwaffe reconnaissance aircraft, finding themselves unstuck, they proceeded to the Matochkin Strait. They were found there by a flotilla of corvettes, who escorted the four-ship convoy plus two other merchant vessels to Arkhangelsk, arriving on 25 July.

In the voyage to the Russian ports, some of the ships and lifeboat craft took refuge along the coast of Novaya Zemlya, landing at Matochkin. The Soviet tanker Azerbaijan lost her cargo of linseed oil and much of SS Winston-Salem's cargo was jettisoned in Novaya Zemlya. Many ships' locations were unknown, in spite of searches by Coastal Command aircraft, which had proceeded to north Russia after their patrols and by minesweepers and corvettes. A fortnight elapsed before the results of the attacks and the fate of the convoy were fully known. Of the 34 ships which had left Iceland, 23 were sunk; two British, four American, one Panamanian and two Russian merchant ships reached Arkhangelsk. Two American ships, Samuel Chase and Benjamin Harrison, docked at Murmansk. The deliveries amounted to 70,000 short tons (64,000 t) out of the 200,000 short tons (180,000 t) which had started from Iceland. Equipment losses in the convoy were, 3,350 vehicles, 210 aircraft, 430 tanks and 109,466 short tons (99,306 t) of other cargo such as food and ammunition.

== Aftermath ==
=== Analysis ===
In the short term, the losses caused poor relations among the three Allies. Stalin and Soviet naval leaders found it difficult to understand the order to scatter given by the Admiralty which required unescorted cargo vessels to reach Soviet ports, one by one. This contributed to perceptions in the west that the Soviets lacked gratitude for the efforts of and losses by the Western Allies. When the head of the Soviet Military Mission in London, Admiral Nikolay Kharlamov and the Soviet ambassador, Ivan Maisky, asked when Convoy PQ 18 would sail, Pound said nothing could be done until better air cover was arranged – after which Kharlamov criticised the order to withdraw the cruisers from Convoy PQ 17. Pound, angered by the comment, stated that he had ordered the convoy to scatter; Maisky commented that "even British admirals make mistakes". The US Admiral Ernest J. King, who already distrusted his British counterparts, was furious with what he perceived as Pound's bungling and promptly transferred TF 39 to the Pacific and hesitated to conduct further joint operations under British command. The US Admiral Dan Gallery, who was serving in Iceland, later described Convoy PQ 17 "a shameful page in naval history".

Churchill called the convoy "one of the most melancholy naval episodes in the whole of the war". An inquiry assigned no blame to anyone, since orders were issued by the First Sea Lord and blaming the First Sea Lord was considered politically unacceptable. In view of the Convoy PQ 17 disaster, the Admiralty proposed to suspend the Arctic convoys at least until the ice receded and perpetual daylight passed. In a meeting with Hitler, Raeder stated that "our submarines and aircraft, which totally destroyed the last convoy, have forced the enemy to give up this route temporarily...".

=== Subsequent operations ===
It was not until September that Convoy PQ 18 set out for North Russia. The convoy's defence scheme was revised, with a very strong constant close escort of sixteen destroyers and the first of the new escort carriers, HMS Avenger, with twelve fighters and three Swordfish ASW aircraft. After the war there was criticism of this delay in American and Soviet sources. Soviet historians give varying reasons for the suspension and reduction in supply caused by the halt in the Arctic convoys. Some considered it the result of "the fact that in 1942, Anglo-American (ocean) communications were destroyed".

== Broome v Cassell & Co Ltd ==
In 1968, David Irving published a controversial book about Convoy PQ 17. It concentrated on Allied blunders and shortcomings, alleging that Broome's decision to withdraw his destroyers was the primary cause of the disaster to the convoy. Broome litigated in Broome v Cassell & Co Ltd, to defend his reputation. Broome won his case and was awarded £40,000 in damages and secured the withdrawal of all copies of the offending book from circulation (it has since been republished, with corrections). The damages (donated by Broome to charity) were the highest paid in English legal history until 1987.

=== Luftflotte 5 ===
Luftflotte 5, 1 June 1942
Command	Units
Luftflotte 5 HQ Colonel-General Hans-Jürgen Stumpff
Oslo	Wettererkundungsstaffel 5 (Weather reconnaissance squadron)
Fliegerführer Nord (Ost) Oberst (Colonel) Hermann Busch
Kirkenes	I. and II./Kampfgeschwader 30; II. and 13./Jagdgeschwader 5; I./Sturzkampfgeschwader 5 (Dive-Bomber Wing); 3./Kampfgeschwader 26; 1./Seeaufklärungsgruppe 125 (Maritime Reconnaissance Wing); 1./Fernaufklärungsgruppe 22; 1./Fernaufklärungsgruppe 124 (Long-Range Reconnaissance Wing)
Fliegerführer Nord (West) Oberst Alexander Holle
Sola	I./Kampfgeschwader 26; I./Kampfgeschwader 40; 2./Küstenfliegergruppe 906 (Coastal Reconnaissance Wing); Bordfliegerstaffel Tirpitz; 1./Fernaufklärungsgruppe 120
Fliegerführer Lofoten Oberst Ernst-August Roth
Bardufoss	III./Kampfgeschwader 30; III./Jagdgeschwader 5; 2./Kampfgeschwader 26; 4./Sturzkampfgeschwader 5; Kette 1./Fernaufklärungsgruppe 124
Jagdfliegerführer Norwegen (Note: Fighter Commander Norway)
Trondheim	I./Jagdgeschwader 5; Jagdgruppe Drontheim (Fighter Wing)
Seenotdienstführer Norwegen (Note: Maritime Rescue Service Leader Norway)
—	Seenotbereichskommando VIII (Maritime Rescue Area Command); Seenotbereichskommando IX

== See also ==
- Convoy battles of World War II
- Action in the North Atlantic, a 1943 war movie starring Humphrey Bogart and Raymond Massey, includes a section which is drawn from Lieutenant Gradwell's actions after Convoy PQ 17 scattered.
- HMS Ulysses (1955), a novel written by Alistair MacLean, who served on HMS Royalist on Arctic convoys and against the German battleship Tirpitz.
- A Northern Saga, a 1976 novel written by Steven C. Lawrence, a World War II US Merchant Marine officer, recounts the story of Convoy PQ 17.
- Requiem for Convoy PQ-17, a novel by Valentin Pikul is dedicated to the fate of the convoy. The book is also interesting since it describes the Soviet belief that Soviet submarine K-21 hit Tirpitz. From April 2003, a film was released in Russia based on this book.
- Requiem for Convoy PQ-17 is also the title of a dance, orchestra, and choir piece based on the events surrounding the sinkings. Choreographer and dancer Bill Coleman's father was a merchant mariner on board the Bolton Castle.
- In January 2014, the hour-long BBC Two documentary PQ17: An Arctic Convoy Disaster, written and narrated by Jeremy Clarkson, retold the story of the convoy with first-hand testimony from the men who served.
- The Arctic Convoy, a 2023 Norwegian film by Henrik Martin Dahlsbakken inspired by Convoy PQ 17.
- The Captain, a 1967 novel based on the experiences of this convoy by Dutch writer Jan de Hartog, also translated into Dutch as De kapitein.
