= Young v Bristol Aeroplane Co Ltd =

1944 English Court of Appeal case setting rules on precedent and stare decisis

Young v Bristol Aeroplane Co Ltd ([1944] KB 718 CA) was an English court case that established that the Court of Appeal is bound to follow its own decisions and those of courts of co-ordinate jurisdiction, except in the following cases:

1. the court is entitled and bound to decide which of two previous conflicting decisions of its own it will follow;
2. the court is bound to refuse to follow a decision of its own which cannot stand with a decision of the Supreme Court (previously the House of Lords);
3. the court is not bound to follow a decision of its own if the decision was given per incuriam (where a statute or a rule having statutory effect which would have affected the decision was not brought to the attention of the earlier court).

The Human Rights Act 1998 created an exception to the Young rule. If a prior decision was contrary to Convention rights, the Court of Appeal is required to give effect to the Convention rights even if doing so involves disapplying their own past precedent or precedent from the House of Lords/Supreme Court. (See also: Culnane v Morris & Anor–a case concerning qualified privilege–overruling Plummer v Chairman; Miller v Bull–which concerned a time extension to comply with the formalities under the Election Petition Rules 1960–which overruled Ahmed v Kennedy. The latter case, though heard after the HRA 1998 came into effect, had failed to consider whether the Human Rights Act had been breached.)

During the UK's membership of the European Union, the European Communities Act 1972 required the Court of Appeal to follow decisions of the European Court of Justice. Following departure, this is now governed by the provisions of the European Union (Withdrawal) Act 2018.

The Court of Appeal considered disapplying the Young doctrine in respect to decisions on interlocutory appeals, but has now rejected that principle.

The decision of the Court of Appeal in R v James and Karimi may also have future implications regarding precedent and Privy Council decisions; the Court of Appeal deciding to follow the Privy Council ruling in Attorney-General for Jersey v Holley [2005] as opposed to the contentious House of Lords decision in R v Smith (Morgan James) [2001] in a case concerning defendant characteristics and provocation under s.3 of the Homicide Act 1957.
