= Dehane =

Village in Maharashtra

- village
- Location in Maharashtra, India Dehane (India)
- Coordinates: 19.9129312°N 72.783597°E
- Country: India
- State: Maharashtra
- District: Palghar
- Taluka: Dahanu
- Elevation: 11 m (36 ft)

Population (2011)
  - Total: 3,214
- Time zone: UTC+5:30 (IST)
- 2011 census code: 551617

Dehane is a village in the Palghar district of Maharashtra, India. It is located in the Dahanu taluka.

== Demographics ==
According to the 2011 census of India, Dehane has 651 households. The effective literacy rate (i.e. the literacy rate of population excluding children aged 6 and below) is 56.32%.

Demographics (2011 Census)
	Total	Male	Female
Population	3214	1595	1619
Children aged below 6 years	549	279	270
Scheduled caste	0	0	0
Scheduled tribe	2394	1199	1195
Literates	1501	892	609
Workers (all)	1473	863	610
Main workers (total)	1286	805	481
Main workers: Cultivators	182	132	50
Main workers: Agricultural labourers	486	251	235
Main workers: Household industry workers	8	5	3
Main workers: Other	610	417	193
Marginal workers (total)	187	58	129
Marginal workers: Cultivators	50	16	34
Marginal workers: Agricultural labourers	101	22	79
Marginal workers: Household industry workers	2	1	1
Marginal workers: Others	34	19	15
Non-workers	1741	732	1009
