= Michael Kempster =

Michael Edmund Ivor Kempster, CBE (21 June 1923 – 28 May 1998) was a British barrister who served as a Judge of the Supreme Court of Hong Kong from 1982 to 1984 and a Justice of Appeal of the Supreme Court of Hong Kong from 1984 to 1993.
