= Per incuriam =

Finding that a previous judgement failed to take account of law or precedent

Per incuriam, literally translated as "through lack of care" is a device within the common law system of judicial precedent. A finding of per incuriam means that a previous court judgment has failed to pay attention to relevant statutory provision or precedents.

The significance of a judgment having been decided per incuriam is that it need not be followed by a lower court. Ordinarily, the rationes of a judgment is binding upon lower courts in similar cases. However, a lower court is free to depart from a decision of a superior court if the earlier judgment was decided per incuriam.

== Judicial interpretation ==
The Court of Appeal for England and Wales recognised this as an exception to the general application of stare decisis in Young v Bristol Aeroplane Co Ltd. Judges have interpreted the meaning of the doctrine in a variety of ways.

In the Court of Appeal case Duke v Reliance Systems Ltd, Sir John Donaldson MR stated the doctrine as follows:

I have always understood that the doctrine of per incuriam only applies where another division of this court has reached a decision in the absence of knowledge of a decision binding upon it or a statute, and that in either case it has to be shown that, had the court had this material, it must have reached a contrary decision. That is per incuriam. I do not understand the doctrine to extend to a case where, if different arguments had been placed before it or if different material had been placed before it, it might have reached a different conclusion.

In Simpson v R, the English Court of Appeal preferred a definition from Bennion on Statutory Interpretation:

The basis of the per incuriam doctrine is that a decision given in the absence of relevant information cannot be safely relied on. This applies whenever it is at least probable that if information had been known the decision would have been affected by it.

== Examples of per incuriam ==
Examples of per incuriam are uncommon partly because the device is perceived by upper courts as a type of lèse-majesté, and respectful lower courts prefer to distinguish such precedent cases if possible.

The Court of Appeal in Morelle Ltd v Wakeling [1955] 2 QB 379 stated that "[a]s a general rule, the only cases in which decisions should be held to have been given per incuriam are those of decisions given in ignorance or forgetfulness of some inconsistent statutory provision or of some authority binding on the court concerned and so in such cases some part of the decision or some step in reasoning on which it is based is found, on that account, to be demonstrably wrong."

In R v Northumberland Compensation Appeal Tribunal ex parte Shaw [1951] 1 All ER 268, a divisional court of the King's Bench division declined to follow a Court of Appeal decision on the ground that the decision had been reached per incuriam for failure to cite a relevant House of Lords decision.

Some academic critics have suggested that Re Polemis was decided per incuriam as it did not rely upon the earlier decision in Hadley v Baxendale 1854.

Similarly, others have suggested that Foakes v Beer was decided per incuriam as it failed to note the recent House of Lords decision in Hughes v Metropolitan Railway Co 1877.

== See also ==
- Stare decisis
