= Valentin Pikul =

Soviet historical novelist

Valentin Savvich Pikul
- Born: Valentin Savvich Pikul; July 13, 1928; Leningrad, RSFSR, Soviet Union
- Died: July 16, 1990 (aged 62); Riga, Latvian SSR, Soviet Union
- Writing career
- Language: Russian
- Genres: Popular history, fiction
- Notable works: Requiem for Convoy PQ-17; The Favorite

Valentin Savvich Pikul (Russian: Валенти́н Са́ввич Пи́куль; July 13, 1928 – July 16, 1990) was a Soviet historical novelist of Ukrainian-Russian heritage. He lived and worked in Riga.

Pikul's novels were grounded in extensive research, blending historical and fictional characters and often focusing on Russian nationalistic themes. Pikul's best-selling 1978 novel At the Last Frontier was a dramatized telling of Rasputin's influence over the Russian imperial court. Richard Stites says he was "a name hardly known to literary scholars but the most widely read author in the Soviet Union from the seventies to today [i.e., 1991]... Pikul's works were wildly popular: more than 20 million copies were sold in his lifetime.

Little of Pikul's work has been translated into English. In May 2001, a Natya-class minesweeper of the Black Sea Fleet was named in his honor. So too was an oil tanker built in 2023 for state oil producer Rosneft's shipping business.

== Works ==
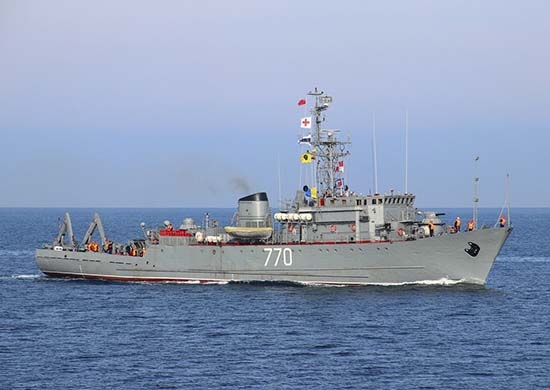
Sea minesweeper of the Black Sea Fleet "Valentin Pikul"

- Ocean patrol, (Океанский патруль), 1954
- Bajazet, (Баязет), 1961
- Tares, (Плевелы), 1962
- Paris for three hours, (Париж на три часа), 1962
- On the outskirts of a great empire, (На задворках великой империи), 1964–66
- Out of the deadlock, (Из тупика), 1968
- Requiem for Convoy PQ-17, (Реквием каравану PQ-17), 1970
- Moonzund, (Моонзунд), 1970 (screen version - Moonzund, 1987)
- By plume and sword, (Пером и шпагой), 1972
- Stars over the marsh, (Звёзды над болотом), 1972
- Boys with bows, (Мальчики с бантиками), 1974
- The Word and the Action, (Слово и дело), 1974–75
- The Battle of Iron Chancellors,(Битва железных канцлеров), 1977
- Riches, (Богатство), 1977
- The Demonic Forces, (Нечистая сила), 1979
- The Three Ages of Okini-San, (Три возраста Окини-сан), 1981
- To each his own, (Каждому своё), 1983
- The Favorite, (Фаворит), 1984
- Cruisers, (Крейсера), 1985
- I have the honour, (Честь имею), 1986
- Hard Labor, (Каторга), 1986
- Go and sin no more, (Ступай и не греши), 1990
- Operation Barbarossa, (Барбаросса. Площадь павших борцов), 1990
- Arakcheevshina, (Аракчеевщина)
- Domini canes, (Псы господни)
- Janissary, (Янычары)
- Fat, dirty and corrupt, (Жирная, грязная и продажная)
