= Jack Broome =

Royal Navy officer

Captain Jack Broome DSC
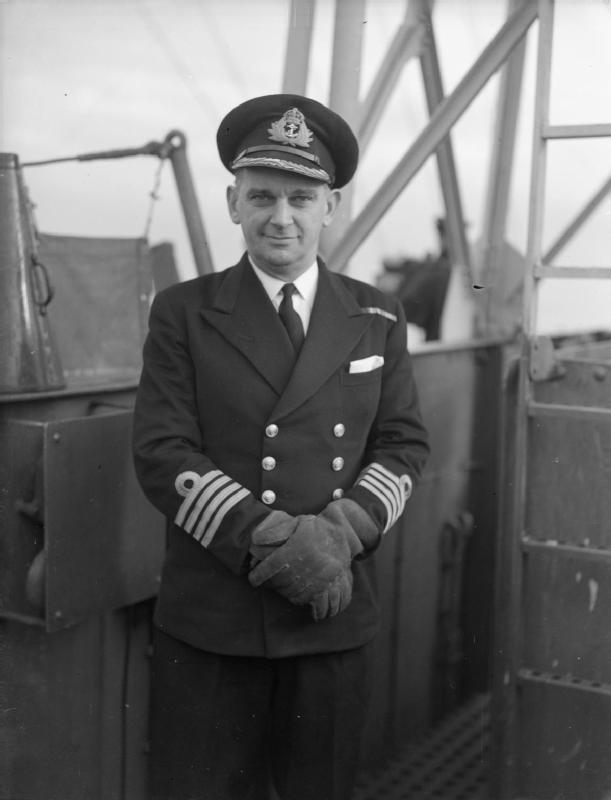
- Broome on the bridge of HMS Begum in 1944
- Born: John Egerton Broome; 23 February 1901; Seattle, Washington
- Died: 19 April 1985 (aged 84)
- Military career
- Allegiance: United Kingdom
- Branch: Royal Navy
- Service years: 1914–47
- Rank: Captain
- Nickname: Jack
- Commands: HMS Rainbow; HMS Veteran; First Escort Group, HMS Keppel; HMS Begum; HMS Vernon; HMS Ramillies
- Conflicts: Norwegian campaign Battle of the Atlantic; Convoy PQ 17; Indian Ocean
- Awards: Mentioned in Dispatches; Distinguished Service Cross; Burma Star
- Other work: Writer and Cartoonist

Captain John Egerton Broome DSC (23 February 1901 – 19 April 1985), also known as Jackie Broome, was a Royal Navy officer who served in both World Wars. He commanded the escort group of the ill-fated Arctic Convoy PQ 17 in 1942. After the Second World War, he became a writer and illustrator.

== Early career ==
He was born in 1901 in Seattle, Washington, to Louis Egerton Broome and Clara Kathleen (Aimée) Lake. His father was an English adventurer who had joined the gold rush to the Klondike. He accompanied his parents to Panama in 1907, but returned to England, where he was raised largely by his mother's relatives. He attended Oakwood School, Surrey and in 1914 entered the Royal Naval College at Osborne. From Osborne, he passed in 1916 to the senior College at Dartmouth.

== World War I and between the Wars ==
In 1917 he was posted as a midshipman to the battleship HMS Colossus in the Grand Fleet.

Shortly after the end of the War, he was promoted sub-lieutenant and served in the sloop HMS Clematis in the Red Sea and at Aden. From there he attended Trinity Hall, Cambridge, and after graduating in 1923, chose to serve in submarines. By this time, his talent as a cartoonist and wag was well established.

He served in several submarines from 1923 to 1938, except for two short spells on the capital ships HMS Tiger and HMS Royal Oak. Much of this period was spent at the Hong Kong naval station. He married Sybil Nicholas in 1928, with whom he had a son and a daughter.

He reached the rank of commander in 1936, while commanding the submarine, HMS Rainbow. In 1938, he attended a staff course at the Royal Naval College at Greenwich.

== Second World War ==
Broome was judged to be too old in 1939 to command a submarine in wartime. Instead, he was given command of the destroyer HMS Veteran recommissioned from reserve. Characteristically, Broome applied for membership of the Company of Veteran Motorists, who made the ship a life member.

HMS Veteran served in the Norwegian campaign in 1940. While there, her bridge was adorned with a huge stuffed hippopotamus head, acquired by Broome from Formby Golf Club during a spree ashore. Broome also acquired a German torpedo, which had missed its target and run onto the shore of a fjord. Suitably covered in German graffiti, it was eventually handed to the authorities in Rosyth. After the end of the Norwegian campaign, Veteran was assigned to counter a threatened German invasion, and was damaged by an acoustic mine.

With Veteran laid up for extensive repairs, Broome was then assigned as Staff Officer to Admiral Sir Percy Noble, the Commander-in-Chief of the Western Approaches Command. Broome's cartoons enlivened many drab briefing rooms and dreary routine reports.

After several months in this duty, he temporarily served as Captain (D) at the base at Londonderry Port in Derry and then commanded the First Escort Group, (EG1) in the destroyer HMS Keppel. For most of 1941 and 1942, HMS Keppel was engaged in arduous convoy duties in the Atlantic. One brief stay at Lisahally was enlivened by the capture of a German spy who was attempting to escape to the Irish Free State in a stolen motor boat.

=== PQ 17 ===
Then in June 1942, EG1 was assigned to protect Convoy PQ 17, sailing from Hvalfjord in Iceland to Murmansk in Russia. The Arctic convoys were reckoned to be very hazardous missions, as they faced not only U-Boats but also German aircraft and surface ships, including the powerful battleship Tirpitz. A squadron of British and American cruisers was assigned to protect the convoy, and the Home Fleet, with its battleships and aircraft carriers was at sea, but distant.

On 4 July 1942, PQ 17 was attacked several times by torpedo-carrying German aircraft. Three merchant ships were lost, but four aircraft were shot down, and several others damaged. At this point, Admiral Dudley Pound, the First Sea Lord, fearing that Tirpitz was about to attack, sent three fateful signals:

- 2111: Most Immediate. Cruiser Force withdraw to westward at high speed
- 2123: Immediate. Owing to threat from surface ships convoy is to disperse and proceed to Russian ports
- 2136: Most Immediate. My 2123. Convoy is to scatter

The rising tone of panic in these messages convinced Broome and other recipients that Tirpitz was approaching. Since the first of the messages was not directly addressed to Broome, he was not immediately aware that the cruisers were withdrawing. In fact, although they should have been out of sight of the convoy, because of navigational errors they were clearly visible as they worked up to full speed. Convinced that the cruisers were about to engage enemy ships, Broome collected the miscellany of destroyers in EG1 and attached them to the cruisers, while the convoy scattered.

A day later, it became clear that the threat from German surface ships did not exist, and that the scattered ships of the convoy were being picked off individually by U-boats and aircraft. It was by then too late to reform the convoy; Broome's destroyers were low on fuel after their high-speed dash in company with the cruisers, and the oilers which had accompanied the convoy had themselves been sunk.

Twenty-one of the convoy's thirty-five ships were sunk following the order to scatter. The Royal Navy felt themselves disgraced by the unhappy episode. Later that year, the First Lord of the Admiralty, A. V. Alexander paid a visit to HMS Keppel. Broome asked the reason why PQ 17 was scattered but received no satisfactory answer.

=== Later naval career ===
After a brief spell in the Mediterranean, during which EG1 played a peripheral part in Operation Pedestal, HMS Keppel was paid off late in 1942. Broome was surprised to be promoted to captain, and also awarded the Distinguished Service Cross in 1943. (Broome was aware that not only was anyone connected with PQ 17 liable to have that episode on their record, but also that his habit of drawing and circulating acerbic caricatures of senior officers had made him unpopular with some.)

He commanded the escort carrier HMS Begum in 1942–1944. Begum served with the Eastern Fleet. Her aircraft sank a particularly troublesome U-Boat in the Indian Ocean late in 1944, for which Broome was Mentioned in Dispatches. He was also awarded the Burma Star for his service in Indian waters.

He was commandant of a shore establishment at Portsmouth, HMS Vernon II in 1945 before being appointed captain of the aged battleship HMS Ramillies in 1945–1946.

== Writer and cartoonist ==
Broome retired from the Royal Navy in 1947. From 1947 to 1951, he busied himself as editor of the Sketch Magazine. He wrote a number of books on naval subjects, and edited and illustrated several humorous collections of naval signals. He was also a founder member of the Lord's Taverners Cricket Club.

He was naval advisor for several films, including The Cruel Sea. Actor Jack Hawkins apparently based his portrayal of the fictional Commander George Ericson on Broome. He also wrote television and film scripts.

He and his first wife divorced in 1954, and he subsequently married Joan Featherstonhaugh Crisp.

Towards the end of his life, he was able to see Richard Briers play him in a 1981 TV play about PQ 17.

== Libel case ==
In 1968, David Irving published a controversial book about PQ 17. It concentrated on Allied blunders and shortcomings, alleging that Broome's decision to withdraw his destroyers was the primary cause of the disaster to the convoy. Broome mounted a libel action to defend his reputation. He was successful, winning £40,000 in damages and securing the withdrawal of all copies of the offending book from circulation (it has since been republished, with corrections.) The damages payment (donated by Broome to charity) was the highest paid in English legal history until Jeffrey Archer's controversial action against the Daily Star newspaper.

== Published works ==
- Make a Signal, Putnam, 1955
- McTuff at the top, Putnam, 1961.
- Convoy is to Scatter (autobiographical work), William Kimber, 1972, ISBN 0-7183-0332-6
- Make Another Signal, William Kimber, 1973, ISBN 0-7183-0193-5
- Services Wrendered, William Kimber, 1974, ISBN 0-7183-0373-3
