= SK radar =

Radar of the United States Navy

SK (radar)
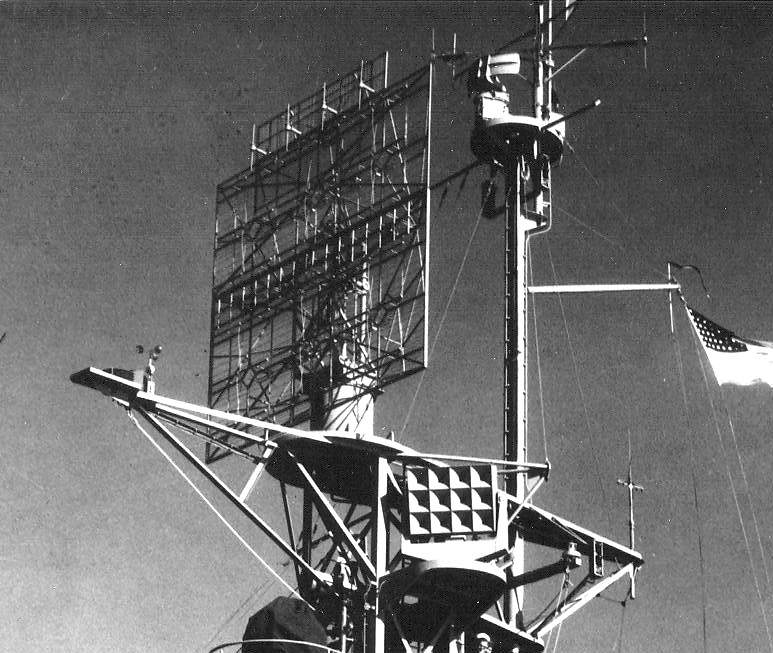
- SK-1 aboard USS Long Island
- Country of origin: United States
- Manufacturer: General Electric
- Introduced: 1944
- Type: Air-search radar
- Frequency: VHF band
- Beamwidth: 10°
- Pulsewidth: 5 μs
- Range: 160.9 km (86.9 nmi)
- Azimuth: ± 3 °
- Precision: ± 100 yd (91 m)
- Power: 250 kW

SK was an American-made air-search radar used during World War II by the United States Navy. Models included SK-1, SK-2 and SK-3.

== Overview ==
SK was a very high frequency search set for large ships. It furnished range and bearing of surface vessels and aircraft, and it could be used for control of interception. It was essentially an SC-2 radar set operating at 200MHz with a larger antenna using 6×6 dipoles. The set had both "A" and PPI scopes, provisions for operating with remote PPIs and for IFF connections, and built-in BL and BI antennas.

With the antenna at 100 ft (30 m), SK could detect medium bombers at 1,000 ft (300 m) altitude at 100 miles (160 km). Range accuracy was ± 100 yards (91 m) and azimuth accuracy ± 3°. There was no elevation control, but elevation could be estimated roughly from positions of maximum and minimum signal strength.

Shipment for SK included spares, with tubes for 400 hours, and a separate generator if the ship's power is DC. SK was not air transportable.

SK had 10 components weighing approximately 5,000 lb (2,300 kg). The heaviest unit, at 2,400 lb (1,100 kg), was the antenna assembly. The antenna measured 15 ft (4.6 m) x 16 ft 9 in (5.11 m). It was mounted 100 ft (30 m) or more above water. The minimum operators required were one per shift. Primary power required was 3500 watts, 115 volts, 60 Hz. The source of power is ship's power of 115 volts, 60 Hz.

During the later stages of World War II, a parabolic antenna called SK-2 replaced the SK-1.

== On board ships ==
=== United States ===
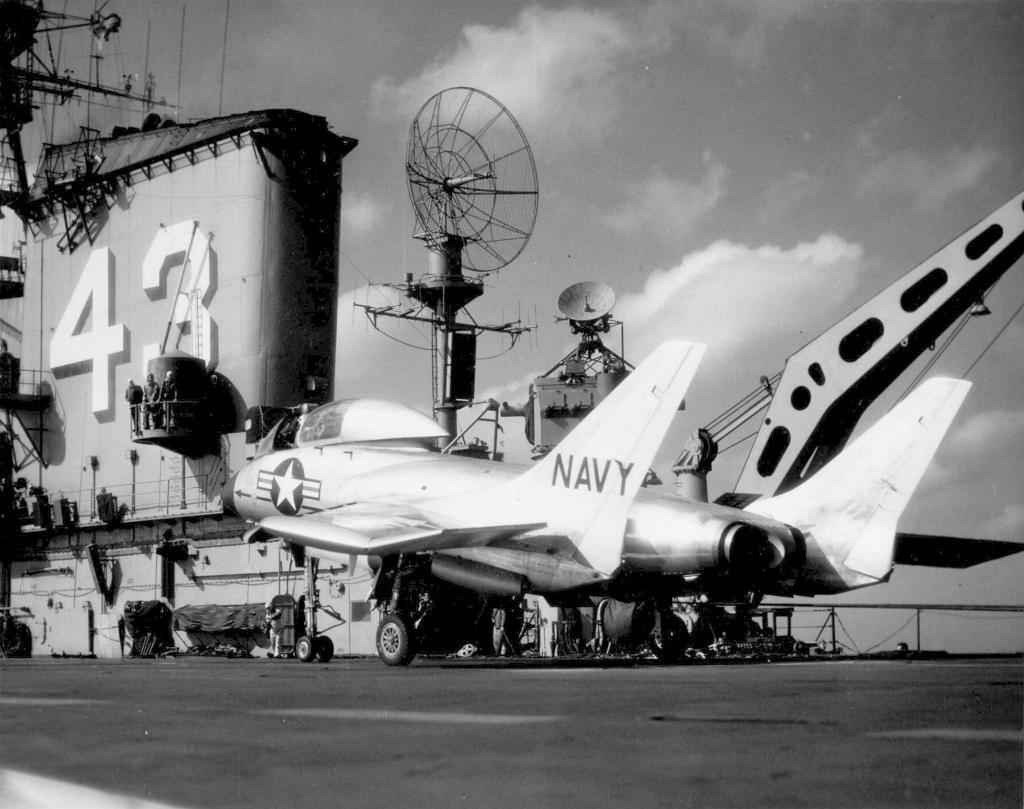
- SK-2 aboard USS Coral Sea
  Midway-class aircraft carrier
- Essex-class aircraft carrier
- Independence-class aircraft carrier
- USS Enterprise (CV-6)
- USS Saratoga (CV-3)
- Casablanca-class escort carrier
- Bogue-class escort carrier
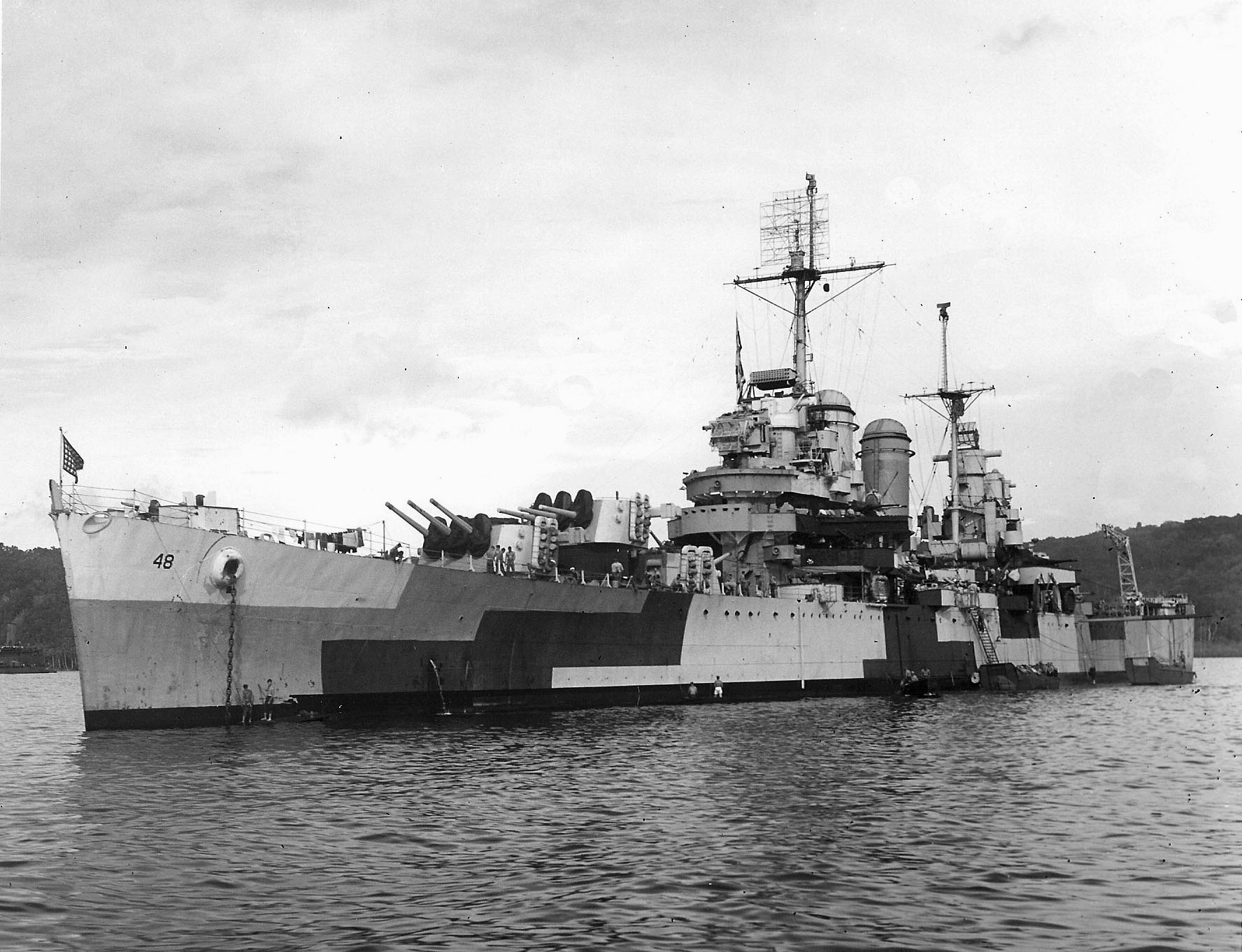
- SK-1 aboard USS Honolulu
  Iowa-class battleship
- South Dakota-class battleship
- North Carolina-class battleship
- Colorado-class battleship
- Tennessee-class battleship
- USS Pennsylvania (BB-38)
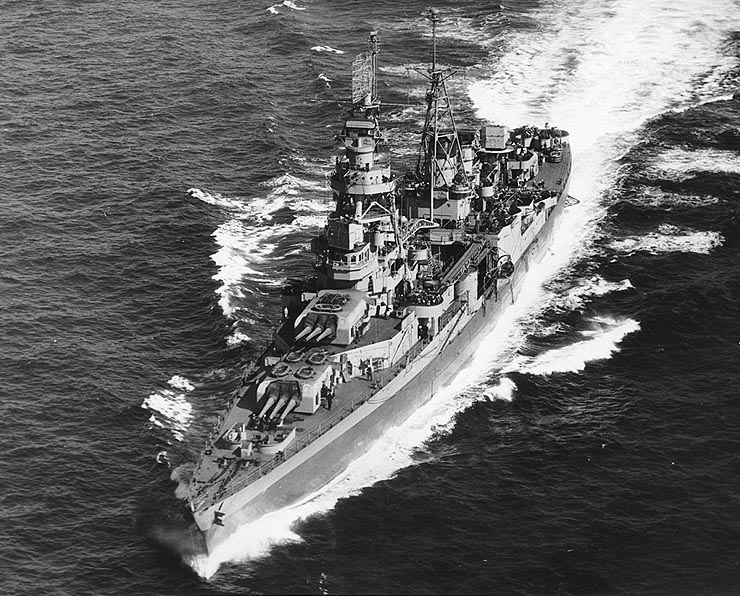
- SK-1 aboard USS Augusta
  Nevada-class battleship
- New York-class battleship
- USS Arkansas (BB-33)
- Alaska-class cruiser
- Des Moines-class cruiser
- Oregon City-class cruiser
- Baltimore-class cruiser
- USS Wichita (CA-45)
- Fargo-class cruiser
- Cleveland-class cruiser
- New Orleans-class cruiser
- Brooklyn-class cruiser
- Portland-class cruiser
- Northampton-class cruiser
- Pensacola-class cruiser
- Omaha-class cruiser
- Currituck-class seaplane tender
- Appalachian-class command ship
- Mount McKinley-class command ship
- Commencement Bay-class escort carrier

=== United Kingdom ===
- Ruler-class escort carrier
- HMS Boxer (F121)

== Gallery ==
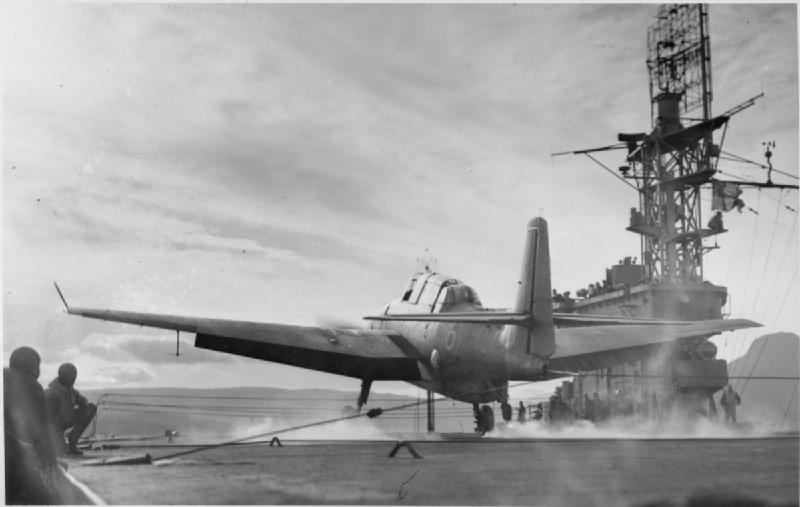
SK-1 aboard HMS Trumpeter

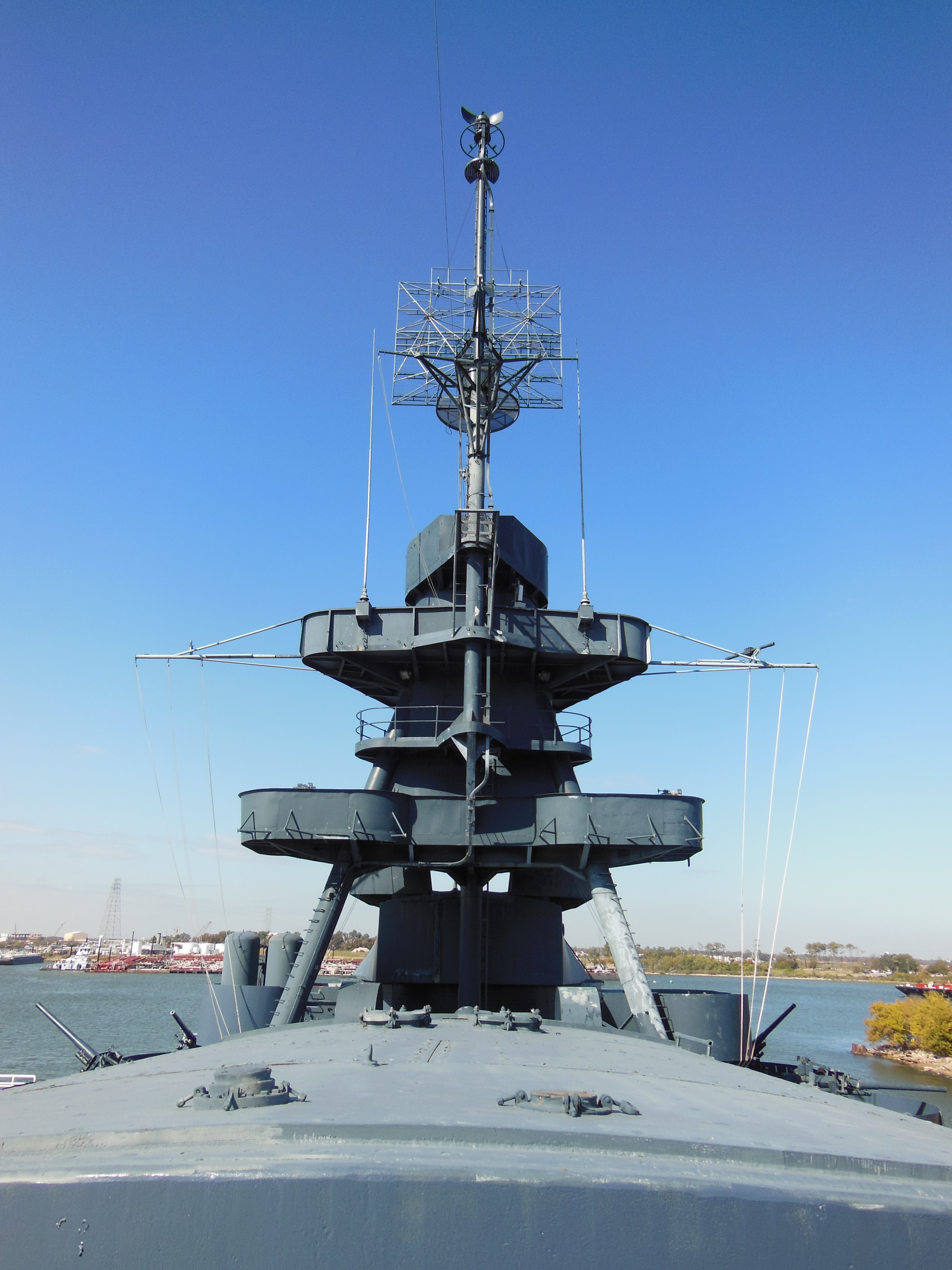
SK-1 aboard USS Texas

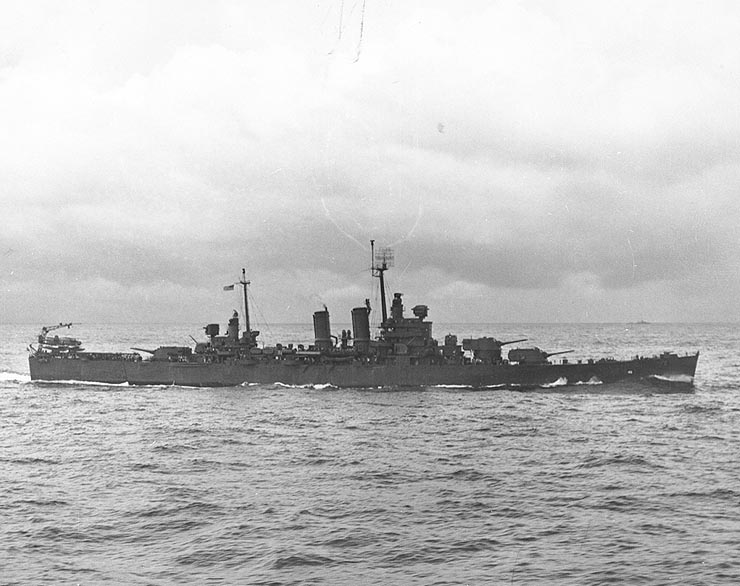
SK-1 aboard USS Wichita

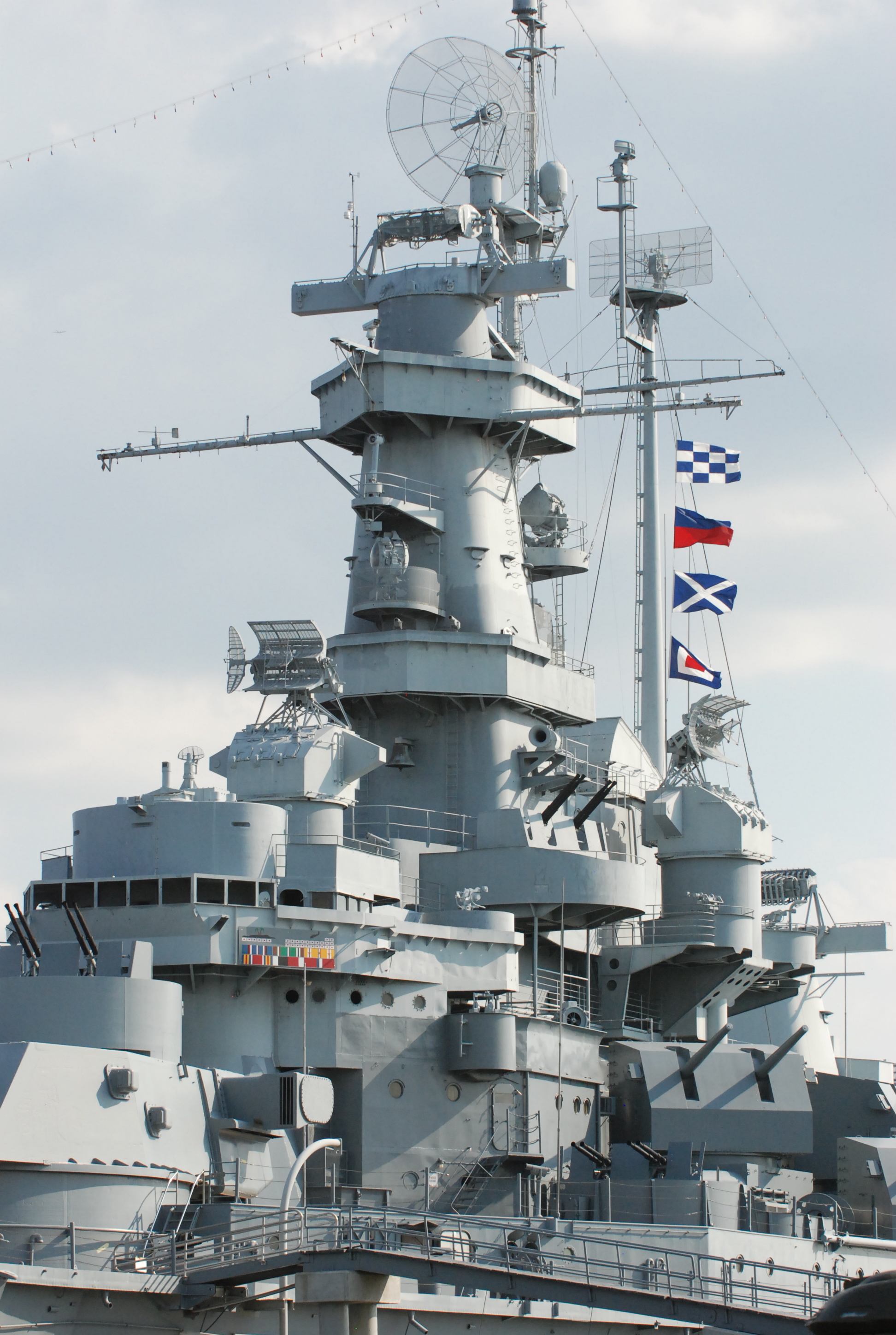
SK-2 aboard USS Alabama

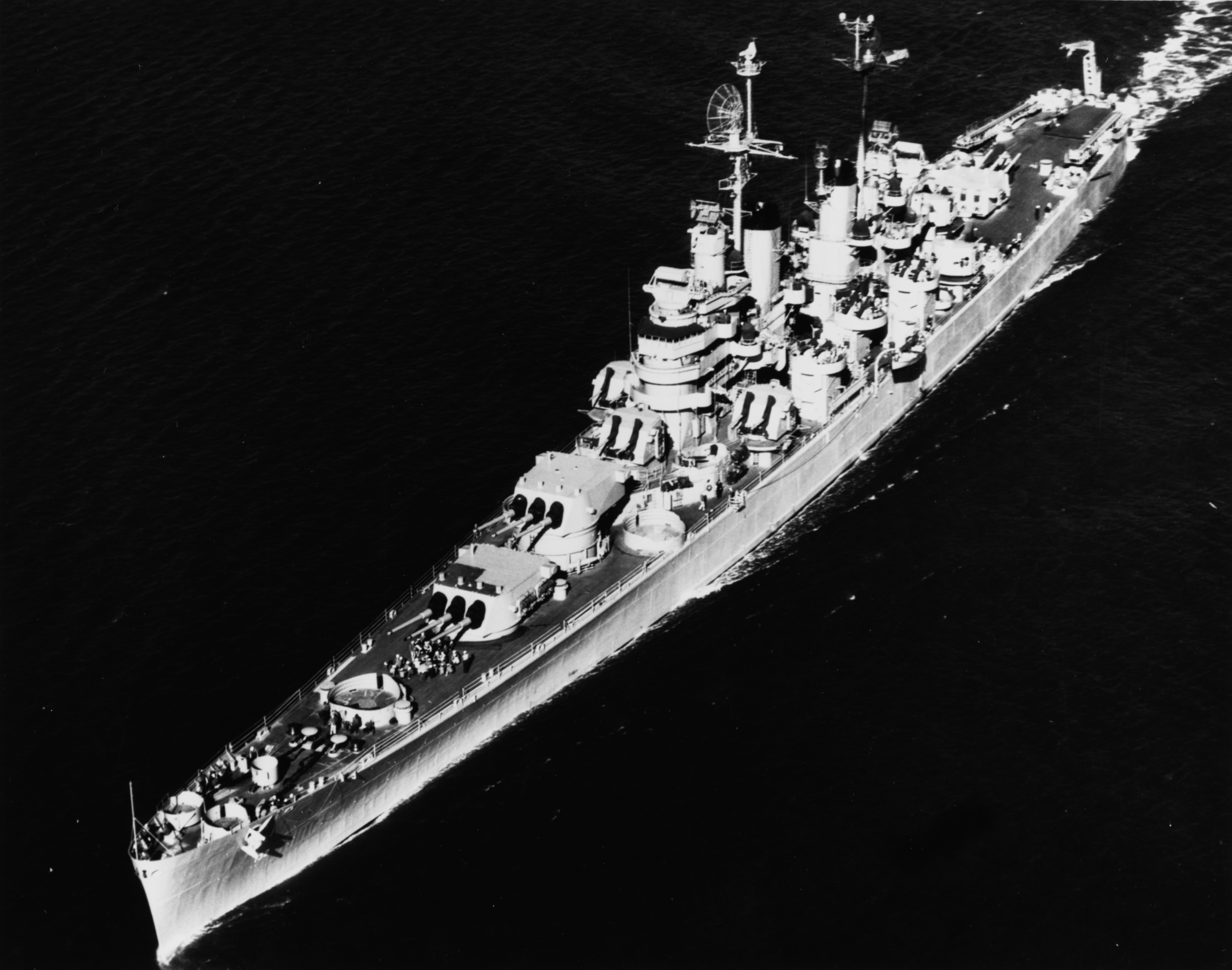
SK-2 aboard USS Macon

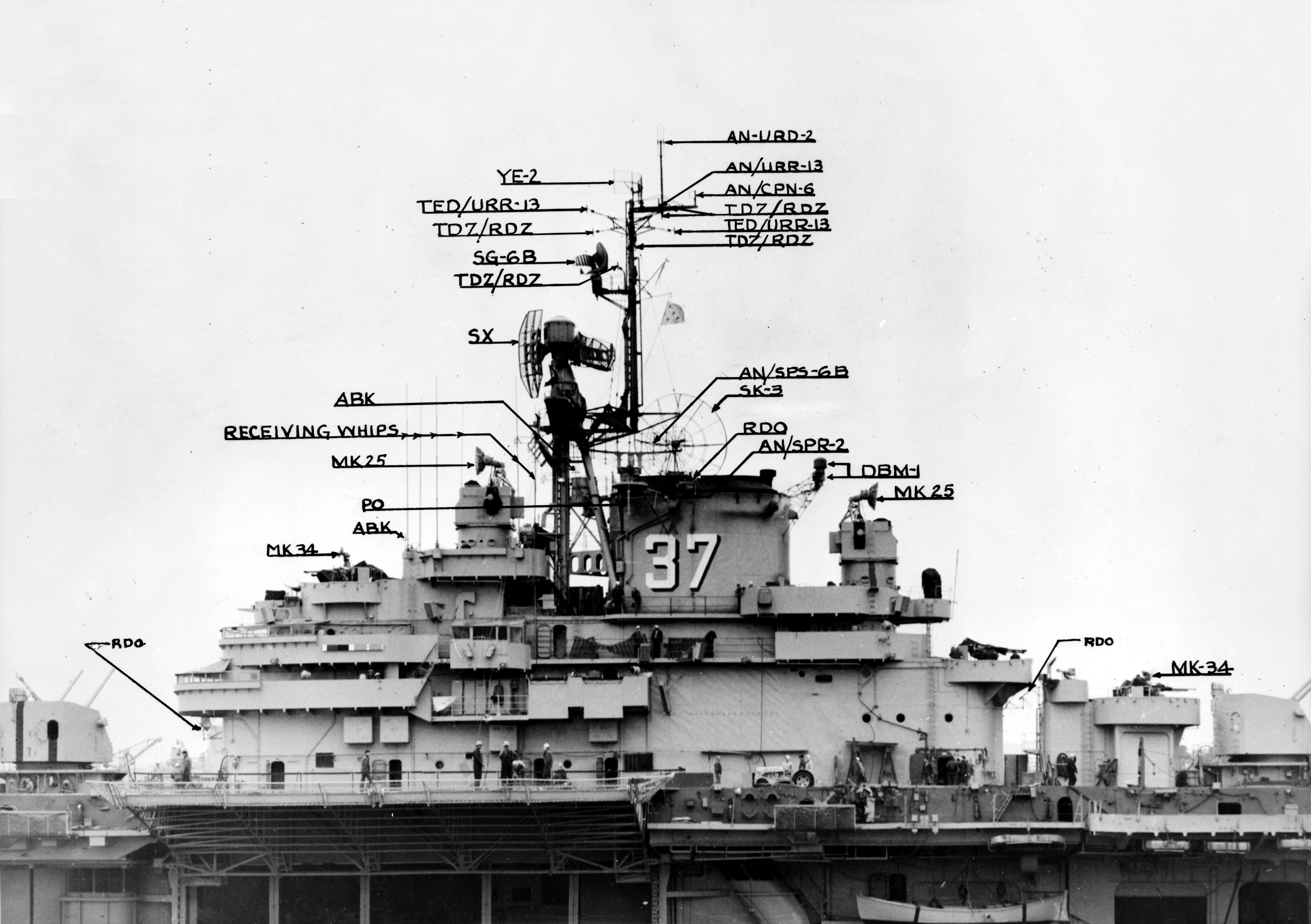
SK-3 aboard USS Princeton

== See also ==
- List of radars
- Radar configurations and types
- Air-search radar
