= New Orleans-class cruiser =

Heavy cruiser class of the United States Navy

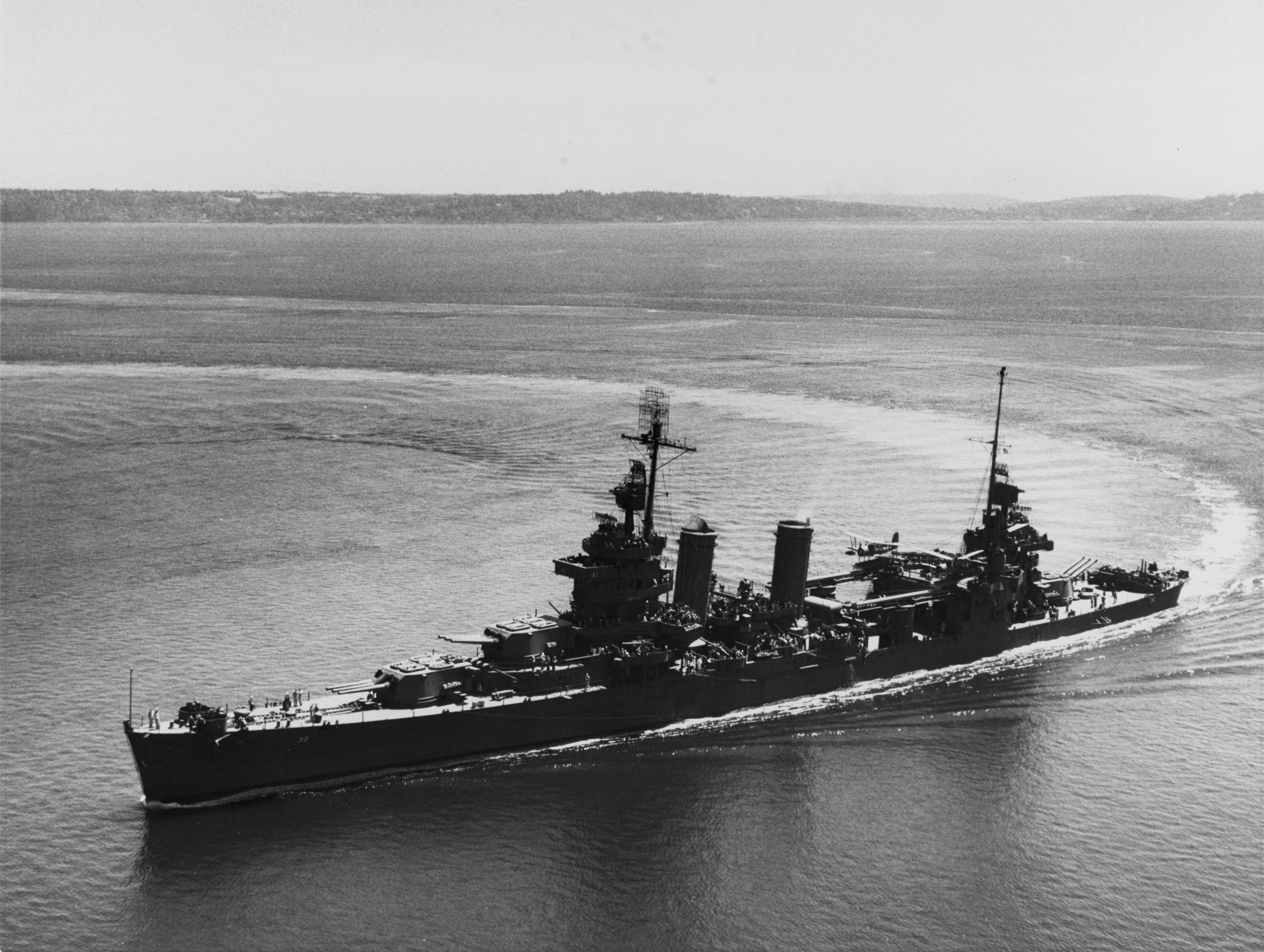
- USS New Orleans

Class overview
- Name: New Orleans class
- Builders: Bethlehem Fore River, MA (2); Brooklyn Navy Yard, NY (1); Puget Sound Navy Yard, WA (1); Philadelphia Navy Yard, PA (1); New York Shipbuilding, NJ (1); Mare Island Navy Yard, CA (1)
- Operators: United States Navy
- Preceded by: Portland class
- Succeeded by: USS Wichita
- Built: 14 March 1931 - 24 February 1937
- In commission: 15 February 1934 – 10 February 1947
- Planned: 7
- Completed: 7
- Lost: 3
- Retired: 4

General characteristics (as built)
- Type: Heavy cruiser
- Displacement: 9,950 long tons (10,110 t); 12,463 long tons (12,663 t) (loaded)
- Length: 578 ft (176 m) wl; 588 ft 2 in (179.27 m) oa
- Beam: 61 ft 9 in (18.82 m)
- Draft: 19 ft 5 in (5.92 m)
- Propulsion: 4 × Parsons/Westinghouse geared turbines; 8 × Babcock & Wilcox boilers; 4 × screws; 107,000 hp (79,800 kW)
- Speed: 32.7 knots (60.6 km/h; 37.6 mph)
- Complement: 708 officers and enlisted
- Sensors & processing systems: 2x Mark 31 GFCS (First six ships) (8in); 1x Mark 31 GFCS + 1x Mark 34 GFCS (Vincennes) (8in); 2x Mark 28 GFCS (First five ships) (5in); 2x Mark 33 GFCS (Last two ships)(5in)
- Armament: 9 × 8-inch/55 caliber guns; 8 × 5-inch/25 caliber guns; 8 × .50 caliber machine guns
- Armor: Belt 3–5 in (76–127 mm); Deck 1.25–2.25 in (32–57 mm); Turrets 1.5–8 in (38–203 mm); Barbettes 5 in (127 mm) (6.5 in (165 mm) in CA-38); Conning tower 5 in (127 mm)

The New Orleans-class cruisers were a class of seven heavy cruisers built for the United States Navy (USN) in the 1930s.

These ships participated in the heaviest surface battles of the Pacific War. Astoria, Quincy, and Vincennes were all sunk in the Battle of Savo Island, and three others were heavily damaged in subsequent battles in the Guadalcanal campaign. Only Tuscaloosa, which spent most of the war in the Atlantic, got through the war without being damaged. Collectively, ships of the class earned 64 battle stars. The four surviving ships were laid up immediately after the end of the war, and sold for scrap in 1959.

== Design ==
The New Orleans-class design was a test bed for innovations in cruiser design, and three distinct designs were used within the class.

Originally called the Astoria class, it was renamed after USS Astoria was sunk and the surviving ships of the class underwent substantial reconstruction.

- Design #1: New Orleans, Astoria, and Minneapolis
- Design #2: Tuscaloosa and San Francisco
- Design #3: Quincy and Vincennes

This class was the direct ancestor for all subsequent USN gun cruisers. From them came the Brooklyn, Wichita, Cleveland, and Baltimore-class cruisers. While the Washington Naval Treaty was still being observed, new technology was implemented in the New Orleans class because the USN knew that if and when war came, they would need this knowledge to build ships (which were already in the planning stage) beyond the treaty limits. The USN came to the conclusion that no 10,000-ton cruiser could adequately perform the roles given.

Originally, Tuscaloosa was the lead ship of this class, but Astoria, New Orleans, and Minneapolis, laid down as Portland-class ships, were reordered to the Tuscaloosa design in 1930; Portland and Indianapolis were being built in civilian rather than Navy yards and were completed as originally designed.

Three ships of the class (Astoria, Quincy, and Vincennes) were lost in the Battle of Savo Island in 1942. Immediately following the Guadalcanal campaign, the remaining ships of the class went through major overhauls to lessen top heaviness caused by new electrical and radar systems and antiaircraft weaponry, which had been added as technology advanced. In doing so, the ships took on a new appearance, most notably in the bridge area, and became known as the New Orleans class. The four survivors were decommissioned shortly after the war ended, and scrapped in 1959–1961.

== Armor ==
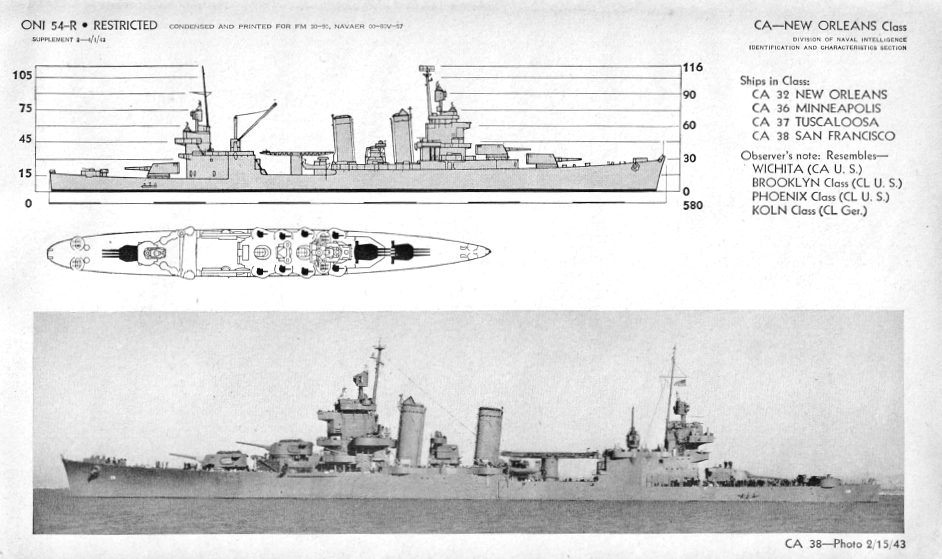
1943 ONI identification image for the New Orleans class

The New Orleans class was the last series of US cruisers completed to the limitations of the Washington Naval Treaty of 1922. As completed, the single-ship Wichita class (and subsequent heavy cruisers) exceeded the 10,000-ton standard.

Design of these ships began in early 1929, based on the three preceding classes: The Pensacola, the Northampton and the Portland classes. All of the cruisers of the New Orleans class were outwardly similar, but the displacement among these ships varied by some 600 tons. The Bureau of Construction and Repair authorized a contemporary 8-inch (203 mm) gun cruiser design of smaller size, but one which allocated considerably more tonnage towards protection. The New Orleans class was noteworthy for its protection. The hull was 12 feet (3.7 m) shorter than a Northampton, with a shorter armor belt that protected only the machinery and other internal spaces, allowing its thickness to be increased to 5 inches (130 mm). The machinery bulkheads were given 3.5 inches (89 mm) and the deck armor was strengthened to 2.25 inches (57 mm). For the first time in US cruisers, barbette and turret armor was sufficient to withstand 8-inch shellfire. The turrets were faced with 8 inches of armor, 2.75 inches (70 mm) on the sides and 1 inch (25 mm) on the roof. The barbettes were protected with 5 inches of armor on all ships except San Francisco, whose barbettes were fitted with 6.5 inches (170 mm) of armor.

Magazine protection was increased to 4 inches (100 mm). Magazine protection was further increased by placing them well below the waterline. Otherwise, only an internal splinter belt and the armor deck protected the magazines. While this allowed an exceptional degree of armored protection for the vitals against shellfire, the protected hull volume was small, and the deep magazines were more exposed to underwater damage (New Orleans learned this the hard way at the Battle of Tassafaronga). Protection represented about 15% of normal displacement as opposed to only 5.6% in the Pensacola's and 6% in the Northampton and Portland classes. The fuel bunkerage had to be reduced, which resulted in a smaller operational range.

== Armament ==
The main armament on the class centered on nine 8 in/55 caliber Mark 14 guns (Mark 9 guns until replaced in World War II), mounted in triple turrets. New Orleans was fitted with Mark 14 Mod 0 guns, Minneapolis with the Mark 15 Mod 1 guns, and the remaining ships of the class received Mark 12 Mod 0 guns. The turret face configurations were also different, with the Mark 14 guns being housed in round-faced turrets and the Mark 12 and 15 guns in a flat-faced turret. The 8 in guns had a range of 31,860 yards (29,130 m) with a muzzle velocity of 2,800 feet per second (853 m/s). The armor-piercing round weighed 260 pounds (118 kg) and could penetrate five inches of armor plating at 19,500 yards (17,830 m).

Secondary armament for the class consisted of eight 5 in/25 caliber dual-purpose guns, which could be used against surface and aerial targets, as well as .50 caliber water-cooled machine guns to augment the 5 in guns. When the US entered the war in December 1941, the New Orleans class and other "Treaty" cruisers were rushed into battle with little modification and lacking in air defense. The Japanese proved at Pearl Harbor and with the sinking of Prince of Wales and Repulse off Malaya that this war would be decided with air power. As soon as available, the quadruple 1.1 in guns and the Swiss-designed 20 mm Oerlikon cannon (which would replace the .50 caliber guns) were fitted, as well as early radar units and fire-control directors. As the war progressed, developments in radar abilities gave the Allies an increasingly decisive advantage over the enemy. In late 1942, the arrival of the 40 mm Bofors (in twin and quadruple mountings), replaced the quadruple 1.1-inch autocannons, which had proved ineffective.

By late 1945, even after the removal of many nonessential items (half of their spotter planes, as well as a crane and a catapult became nonessential due to advances in radar), the ships became dangerously overweight because of new weaponry and electrical and radar equipment. The threat from the air was so intense, this condition had to be tolerated.

== Appearance and performance ==
Outwardly, the New Orleans ships had a distinctive appearance and were considered very good-looking vessels, though the 1942–43 refits of the surviving ships changed the appearance substantially. The forward superstructure had the bridge wings cut back, and all of the large windows were plated in with just a few port holes taking their place. The open bridge above the wheelhouse was enlarged by 100% by extending it forward. In addition, several gun tubs were created for the 40 mm Bofors mounts, both around the main mast and aft. The forecastle deck extended back to the second funnel and the main superstructure was constructed without the ungainly tripod mast seen on the previous cruisers. The bow was a raked type, similar to those of British cruisers. The two funnels were situated closer together, with a large searchlight tower in between. Aircraft-handling facilities were moved further aft and a larger second conning station was erected above the hangar. A single mainmast was erected there, between two huge pedestal cranes, which handled both spotter planes and small craft. The main 8-inch turrets, although armored, were actually smaller, with a more effective angular faceplate. By enlarging the forecastle deck, the secondary battery of 5-inch guns was mounted closer together, facilitating a more efficient ammunition delivery.

Power was provided by eight Babcock & Wilcox steam boilers that produced 107,000 hp (79,800 kW) for the four Westinghouse gearing steam turbines. The turbines were shafted to four screws, giving this class a rated speed of 32.75 knots (60.7 km/h). The cruisers' range – using 2,195 long tons (2,230 t) of bunker oil – was around 9,000 nautical miles (16,670 km) at 10 knots (19 km/h) or 5,280 nautical miles (9,779 km) at 20 knots (37 km/h). Their range could be extended by refueling from an oiler or another ship fitted to transfer oil while underway.

The New Orleans cruisers performed peacetime exercises well with no serious shortcomings being found. While many changes were implemented to improve their performance and especially their protection, the 10,000-ton limit of the Washington Naval Treaty was not exceeded. The new cruisers were considered successful in their own right, but could not be considered equal to some foreign contemporaries, which were often considerably larger.

== Ships in class ==
Construction data
Ship name	Hull no.	Builder	Laid down	Launched	Commission	Decommission	Fate
New Orleans	CA-32	New York Navy Yard	14 March 1931	12 April 1933	15 February 1934	10 February 1947	Struck 1 March 1959; Sold for scrap; 22 September 1959
Astoria	CA-34	Puget Sound Naval Shipyard	1 September 1930	16 December 1933	28 April 1934	—N/a	Sunk, Battle of Savo Island 9 August 1942
Minneapolis	CA-36	Philadelphia Navy Yard	27 June 1931	6 September 1933	19 May 1934	10 February 1947	Struck 1 March 1959; Sold for scrap, 14 August 1959
Tuscaloosa	CA-37	New York Shipbuilding Corporation, Camden, New Jersey	3 September 1931	15 November 1933	17 August 1934	13 February 1946	Struck 1 March 1959; Sold for scrap, 25 June 1959
San Francisco	CA-38	Mare Island Navy Yard	9 September 1931	9 March 1933	10 February 1934	10 February 1946	Struck 1 March 1959; Sold for scrap, 9 September 1959
Quincy	CA-39	Bethlehem Steel Corporation, Fore River Shipyard, Quincy, Massachusetts	15 November 1933	19 June 1935	9 June 1936	—N/a	Sunk, Battle of Savo Island 9 August 1942
Vincennes	CA-44	Bethlehem Steel Corporation, Fore River Shipyard, Quincy, Massachusetts	2 January 1934	21 May 1936	24 February 1937	—N/a	Sunk, Battle of Savo Island 9 August 1942

== World War II ==
For almost four years, the ships of the New Orleans class were assigned to the most urgent of front-line duties, becoming involved in much deadly action. Astoria, Quincy, and Vincennes were sunk in the Battle of Savo Island, 8–9 Aug 1942. Although three of their number were lost, the ships proved to be well designed. New Orleans, Minneapolis, and San Francisco were also seriously damaged in early war engagements in the Pacific. These engagements included the Naval Battle of Guadalcanal, in which San Francisco engaged enemy ships at point-blank range, and the Battle of Tassafaronga where Minneapolis and New Orleans took heavy damage and losses from Long Lance torpedoes. Damage control work and skillful seamanship kept these ships afloat to continue to fight through the end of the war.

New Orleans-class cruisers were found at every major naval skirmish of World War II in the Pacific, despite the fact that only four of the seven units remained after the first year of war. They were some of the most-used and hardest-fought ships of the US Navy during the war. Three ships of this class were among the most decorated US Naval vessels of World War II. San Francisco earned 17 Battle Stars and a Presidential Unit Citation, New Orleans earned 17 Battle Stars, and Minneapolis earned 17 Battle Stars, as well. As a class, they earned a total of 64 Battle Stars and a Presidential Unit Citation.

== See also ==
- New Orleans-class cruiser (1896)
- List of cruisers of the United States Navy
