= Portland-class cruiser =

Class of ships designed and constructed by the United States Navy in 1930

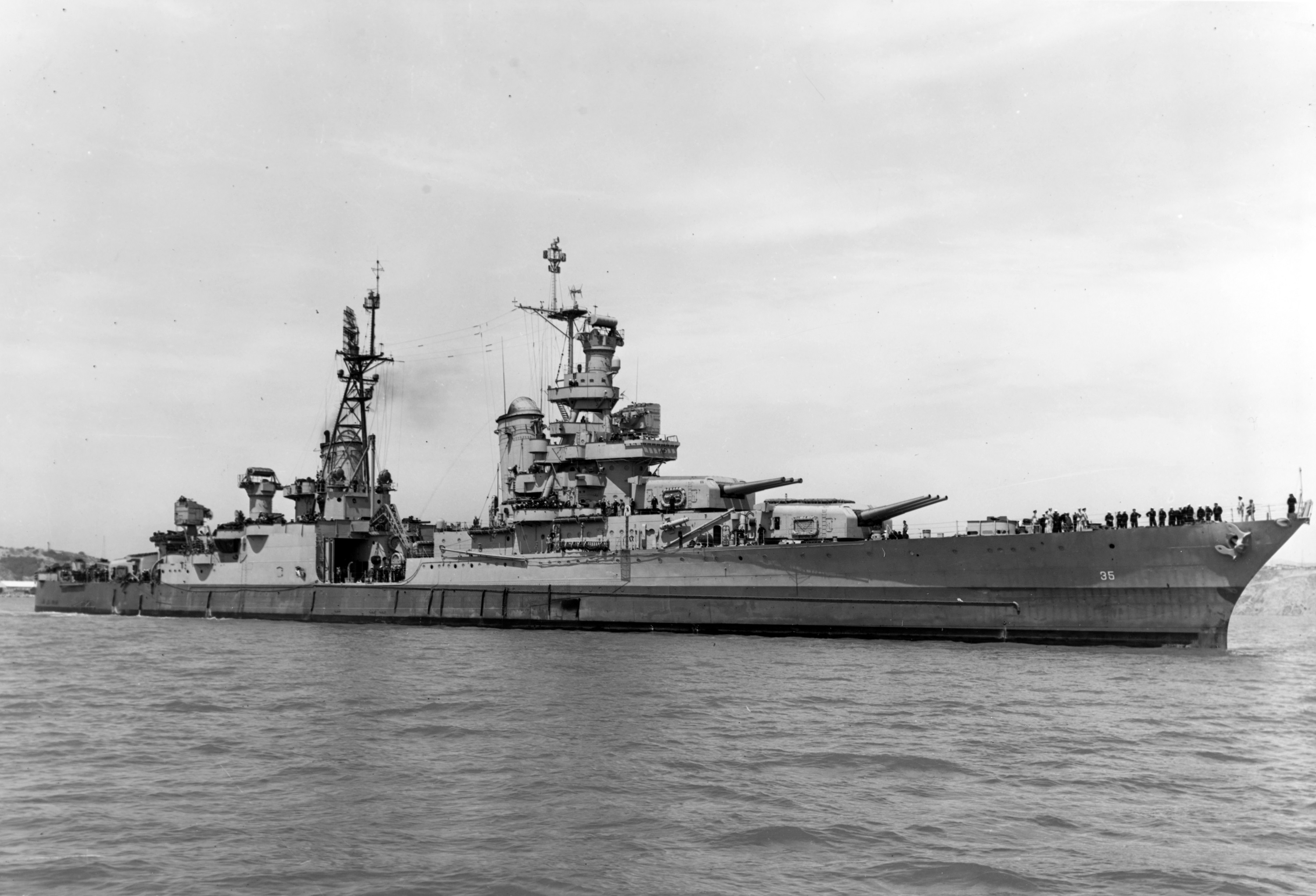
- USS Indianapolis (CA-35) off the Mare Island Naval Shipyard on 10 July 1945

Class overview
- Name: Portland class
- Builders: Bethlehem Fore River, MA; New York Shipbuilding, NJ
- Operators: United States Navy
- Preceded by: Northampton class
- Succeeded by: New Orleans class
- In commission: 1932–1946
- Planned: 5
- Completed: 2
- Lost: 1
- Retired: 1

General characteristics (as built)
- Type: Heavy cruiser
- Displacement: 9,950–9,800 long tons (10,110–9,960 t)
- Length: 592 ft (180 m) wl; 610 ft 3 in (186.00 m) oa
- Beam: 66 ft 3 in (20.19 m)
- Draft: 21 ft (6.4 m) (mean); 23 ft (7.0 m) (maximum)
- Propulsion: 4 × Parsons geared turbines, 8 × White-Forster boilers, 4 × shafts, 107,000 ihp (79,800 kW)
- Speed: 32.7 kn (37.6 mph; 60.6 km/h)
- Range: 13,000 nmi (14,960 mi; 24,080 km) at 15 kn (17 mph; 28 km/h)
- Capacity: Fuel oil: 1,500 tons
- Complement: 807 (peacetime)
- Sensors & processing systems: 2x Mark 27 GFCS; 4x Mark 19 GFCS
- Armament: 9 × 8 in (203 mm)/55 cal guns (3x3); 8 × 5 in (127 mm)/25 cal AA guns; 2 × 3-pounder (47 mm (1.9 in)) saluting guns (removed during wartime); 8 x .50-cal machine guns
- Armor: Belt 3.25–5 in (83–127 mm); Deck 2.5 in (64 mm); Barbettes 1.5 in (38 mm); Gunhouses 1.5–2.5 in (38–64 mm); Conning tower: 1 1/4 in (32 mm)
- Aircraft carried: 3 × SOC Seagull scout-observation seaplanes
- Aviation facilities: 2 × catapults

The Portland class of heavy cruisers was a class of ships designed and constructed by the United States Navy in 1930. The two ships of the class, Portland and Indianapolis, saw extensive service during the Pacific War in World War II.

Designed as a modification over the previous Northampton-class cruiser, the Portland class displaced just under 10,000 long tons (10,000 t) and featured heavier armor and armament than previous cruisers. Featuring 8"/55 caliber guns and designed to function as fleet flagships, the Portland class were intended to fix problems with armament and armor that had been a weakness of preceding U.S. cruisers. These designs were carried over to the following New Orleans class, to which six intended Portland cruisers were converted, three of which were already mid-construction.

Portland served in many engagements including the Battle of Coral Sea, the Battle of Midway and the Guadalcanal campaign, where she was severely damaged but nonetheless able to return to service. She later fought in the Battle of Leyte Gulf and the Battle of Okinawa. Indianapolis served as a fleet flagship for much of the war and fought in the Battle of Philippine Sea and the Battle of Iwo Jima. On 30 July 1945, after transporting components for the nuclear weapons Little Boy and Fat Man from the United States, she was torpedoed by the Japanese submarine I-58. Due to a series of errors and miscommunications her loss was not discovered for several days, and only 316 of her 1,195 crew survived – the greatest single loss of life at sea, from a single ship, in the history of the U.S. Navy.

== Background ==
The Portland class was the third class of heavy cruiser to be constructed by the United States Navy following the Washington Naval Treaty of 1922. The first "treaty cruisers" were the two of the Pensacola class ordered in 1926, which emphasized armament and speed at the expense of protection. These ships were followed by the six vessels of the Northampton class ordered in 1927 with slightly better armor, and introduced the configuration of three triple turrets which would become standard on U.S. Navy heavy cruisers. The Portland class was a modification of both the Pensacola and Northampton designs.

Portland was the first ship constructed under the provision of the 13 February 1929 "Cruiser Act" of the United States Congress, which authorized one aircraft carrier and 15 "light cruisers" to be built. New Orleans (CA-32) had been assigned the first hull number in this group, but was eventually laid down later.

Ordered for the U.S. Navy in fiscal year 1930, the Portland class was originally designated as a light cruiser, and given the hull classification symbol CL, being re-designated a heavy cruiser with the symbol CA on 1 July 1931, due to their armament, in accordance with the London Naval Treaty. Originally, eight cruisers were envisioned as modified Northampton-class vessels, but eventually two of these became the Portland class, with the remaining six eventually being further modified into the succeeding New Orleans class. The first three New Orleans-class cruisers, New Orleans, Astoria, and Minneapolis, were initially ordered as Portland-class vessels, but were reordered to the design of USS Tuscaloosa (CA-37).

== Design ==
As built, the Portland-class cruisers were to be 610 feet 3 inches (186.00 m) in length overall, 592 feet 0 inches (180.44 m) long at the waterline, 64 feet 6 inches (19.66 m) abeam, and with a draft of 21 feet 0 inches (6.40 m), and 24 feet 0 inches (7.32 m) maximum. They were designed for a standard displacement of 10,096 long tons (10,258 t), and a full-load displacement of 12,554 long tons (12,755 t). However, neither completed ship reached this weight, displacing 9,800 long tons (10,000 t) and 9,950 long tons (10,110 t), respectively. The ships featured two distinctive raked funnels, a tripod foremast, and a small tower and pole mast aft. In 1943, light tripods were added forward of the second funnel on each ship, and a prominent Naval director was installed aft.

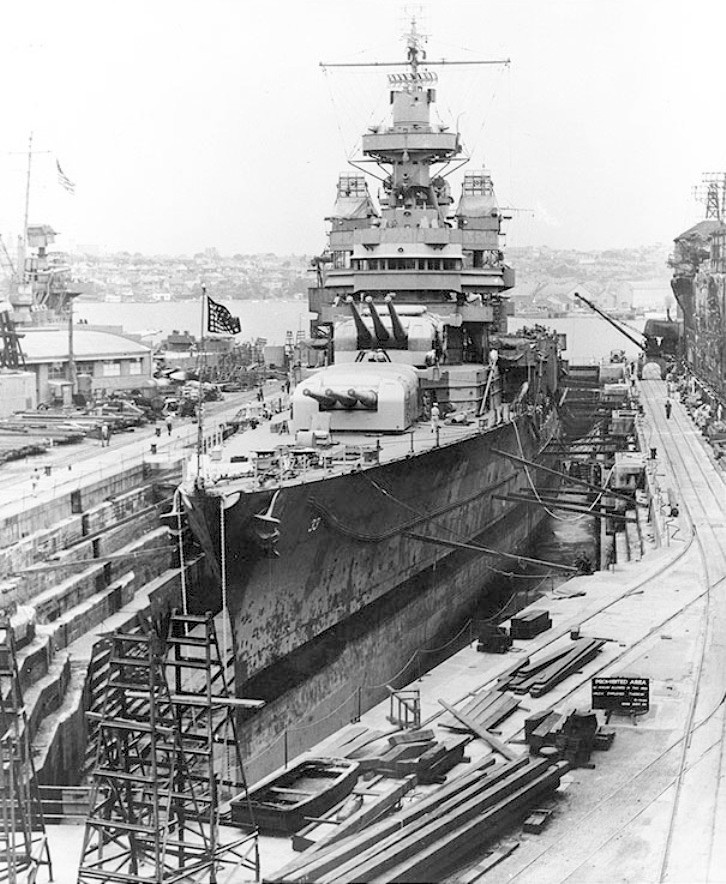
Portland in drydock in Sydney, Australia, in 1942

The ships were equipped with four propeller shafts and four Parsons GT geared turbines and eight Yarrow boilers. The power plant of the ships generated 107,000 shaft horsepower (80,000 kW) and the ships had a design speed of 32 knots (59 km/h) The ships were designed for a range of 10,000 nautical miles (19,000 km; 12,000 mi) at 15 knots (28 km/h). Both completed ships rolled badly until fitted with bilge keels.

The cruisers were armed with a main battery of nine Mark 9 8"/55 caliber guns arrayed in three triple mounts, a superfiring pair fore and one aft. For anti-aircraft defense, they were armed with eight 5"/25 caliber guns and eight .50-cal machine guns. In addition there were two QF 3 pounder Hotchkiss saluting guns. In 1941, the addition of four quadruple 1.1 in (28 mm) anti-aircraft guns was authorised, with these being on board by the first half of 1942. By 1945, the anti-aircraft defenses of both ships had repeatedly been upgraded, with each eventually receiving twenty four Bofors 40 mm guns. On Portland these were arranged in four quad mounts and four twin mounts, and on Indianapolis they were arrayed in six quad mounts. Portland was also upgraded with twelve Oerlikon 20 mm cannons, while Indianapolis instead was fitted with eight twin Oerlikon mounts. No torpedo tubes were fitted on either ship of the class, though they were included in the original design. The ships were outfitted with Mk. 8 rangekeepers and Mk. 27 directors for their 8-inch guns which also housed auxiliary Mk. VII rangekeepers. These were replaced during the war with more modern Mark 34 directors. They were also equipped with four Mark 19 directors for the 5-inch guns, though this was later reduced to two, mounted on the centreline. These directors were then replaced by more modern Mark 33 directors during the war.

The Portland class was originally designed with 1 inch (25 mm) of deck protection and 1 inch (25 mm) of side protection, but during construction they were substantially up-armored. The ships were completed with belt armor 5 inches (130 mm) thick over the magazines and 3.25 inches (83 mm) elsewhere. Armored bulkheads were between 2 inches (51 mm) and 5.75 inches (146 mm), deck armor was 2.5 inches (64 mm), the barbettes were 1.5 inches (38 mm), the gunhouses were 2.5 inches (64 mm), and the conning tower was 1.25 inches (32 mm).

Additionally, the Portland-class cruisers were designed with space to be outfitted as fleet flagships, with space for a flag officer and his staff to operate. The class also featured an aircraft catapult amidships. They could carry four aircraft. The total crew complement varied, with a regular designed crew complement of 807, a wartime complement of 952, which could increase to 1,229 when the cruiser was operating as a fleet flagship.

=== Comparison with previous cruiser designs ===
The Portland class was generally longer than the Northampton class by about 10 feet (3.0 m) and featured a revised bow shape. They were otherwise generally similar to the Northampton class, with an extended forecastle to improve sea-keeping abilities. Their masts were reduced as compared to the Northampton class in order to reduce top weight.

When completed, the Pensacola class displaced 9,000 long tons (9,100 t), which was 980 long tons (1,000 t) less than expected, and were found to be greatly deficient in their protection. For the following Northampton class, the armor protection was increased to 1,040 long tons (1,057 t) with 3 inches (76 mm) of armor along the main belt. Still, these ships only displaced between 8,910 long tons (9,050 t) and 9,200 long tons (9,300 t) While the Portland-class cruisers were more heavily armored than the preceding classes, this problem was found to be so significant that in fiscal year 1929, an entirely different design was formulated for a new class of cruisers, the New Orleans class. Several of the Portland hulls were then converted to New Orleans hulls during construction.

The Portland class were also designed with more advanced armament in mind. Their main guns were the first to be specially designed to fire long-point projectiles with a streamlined shape, which increased the guns' range when compared with older cruiser guns. Such projectiles were in use by ships of the Imperial Japanese Navy, which until that point out-ranged U.S. cruisers with their firepower. The New Orleans class was designed with these lessons in mind, intended to create a better balance between protection, armament and speed.

== Construction ==
Five ships were ordered in fiscal year 1930, to be constructed by three builders. In 1931, CA-32, CA-34, and CA-36, all ordered with Westinghouse machinery, were converted to the New Orleans class. Portland was laid down by Bethlehem Steel at Quincy Shipyard on 17 February 1930, and Indianapolis was laid down by New York Shipbuilding Corporation on 31 March 1930. The hull and machinery of both ships was provided by their respective builders. Indianapolis was launched first, on 7 November 1931 and commissioned on 15 November 1932. Portland was launched on 21 May 1932 and commissioned on 23 February 1933.

== Ships in class ==
Construction data
Ship name	Hull no.	Builder	Laid down	Launched	Comm.	Decomm.	Fate
Portland	CA-33	Bethlehem Shipbuilding Corporation, Fore River Shipyard, Quincy, Massachusetts	17 Feb 1930	21 May 1932	23 Feb 1933	12 Jul 1946	Struck 1 Mar 1959; Sold for scrap 6 Oct 1959
Indianapolis	CA-35	New York Shipbuilding Corporation, Camden, New Jersey	31 Mar 1930	7 Nov 1931	15 Nov 1932	—N/a	Torpedoed and sunk by Japanese submarine I-58, 30 Jul 1945

=== USS Portland (CA-33) ===
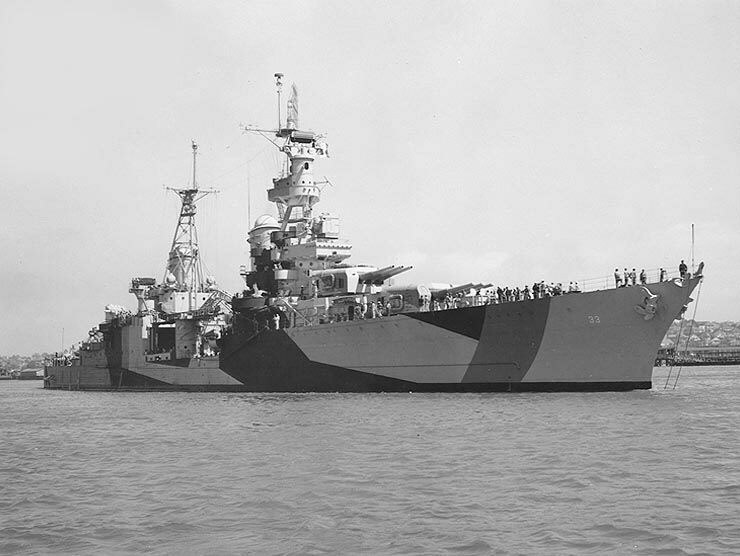
Portland off California in 1944

Portland was the first ship on the scene when the airship Akron went down in 1933, and coordinated efforts to retrieve survivors. She conducted a number of fleet maneuvers and goodwill missions throughout the Pacific Ocean. After the start of World War II, Portland took part in the Battle of Coral Sea, there rescuing 722 survivors from the sunk aircraft carrier Lexington. She then fought at the Battle of Midway, the Battle of the Eastern Solomons, and in the Battle of the Santa Cruz Islands, where she was hit by three dud air-launched torpedoes. She then supported U.S. Marine landings during the Battle of Guadalcanal. During the naval battle there in late 1942, she was struck and severely damaged by a torpedo from the Japanese destroyer Inazuma, a hit which required interim repairs in Australia followed by extensive repairs at Mare Island Navy Yard. In spite of this damage, she was still able to inflict damage on the Japanese battleship Hiei, and helped to sink the destroyers Akatsuki and Yūdachi.

Returning to the war, she bombarded Kiska as part of the Aleutian Islands campaign, played a supporting role in the Gilbert and Marshall Islands campaign, covered landings during the New Guinea campaign, and Pelelieu. She then participated in the Battle of Leyte Gulf - where she helped to sink the Japanese destroyer Asagumo - covered landings in the Philippines, and supported the Battle of Okinawa. At the end of the war she was decommissioned and remained in the United States Reserve Fleet until 1959, when she was broken up for scrap.

=== USS Indianapolis (CA-35) ===
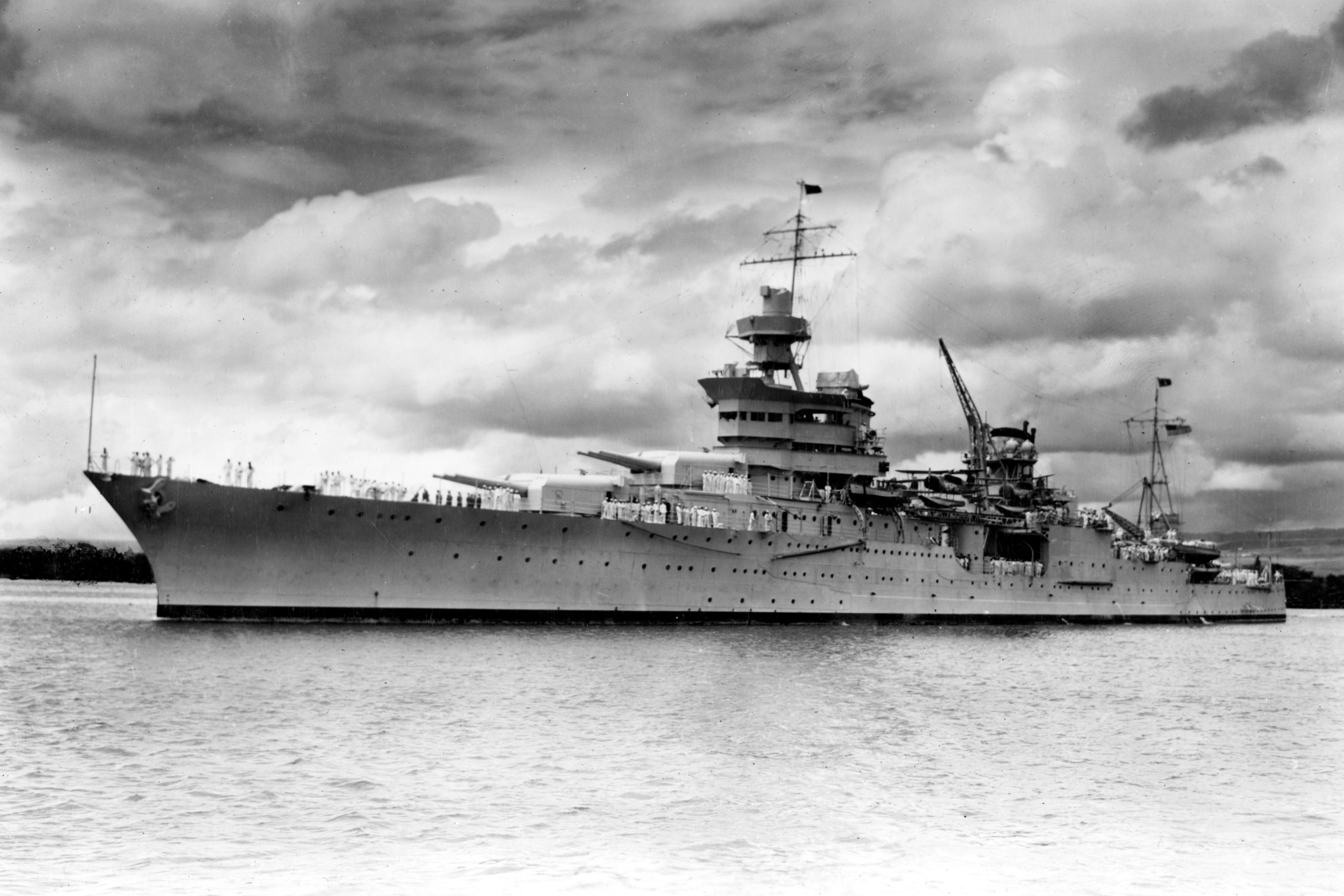
Indianapolis off Pearl Harbor in 1937

Indianapolis served as flagship of Scouting Force 1 during World War II, and saw action in a number of campaigns in the Pacific theater. She supported the Gilbert and Marshall island campaigns as well as operations off the Caroline Islands. Later in the war she fought in the Battle of Philippine Sea and later the Battle of Iwo Jima and participating in the Battle of Okinawa.

In mid-1945, she sailed from the United States to Tinian Island carrying components of Little Boy and Fat Man, the two nuclear weapons which would later be used to bomb Hiroshima and Nagasaki. Sailing for Leyte unescorted under Captain Charles B. McVay III, she was sunk by Japanese submarine I-58 on 30 July 1945, sinking in just 12 minutes. Many sailors were killed by sharks after the wreck. An estimated 900 of her 1,197 crew survived the initial sinking, but her SOS signal was not heard, and due to a series of errors and misunderstandings, her loss was not discovered until 2 August when her crew was spotted by reconnaissance plane. Only 320 men were recovered following the sinking, of whom 316 survived. McVay survived and faced a court martial and reprimand but retired in 1949 as rear-admiral, committing suicide in 1968. Following years of efforts by some survivors and others to clear his name, McVay was posthumously exonerated by the 106th United States Congress and President Bill Clinton on 30 October 2000.

== See also ==
- List of cruisers of the United States Navy
