= Heavy cruiser =

Type of medium to large-sized warship

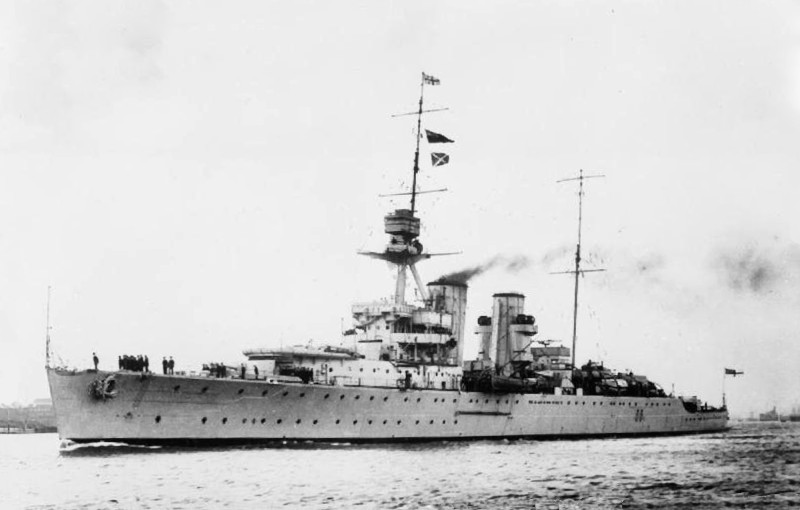
HMS Frobisher, a Hawkins-class cruiser around which the Washington Naval Treaty limits for heavy cruisers were written.

A heavy cruiser was a type of cruiser, a naval warship designed for long range and high speed, armed generally with naval guns of roughly 203 mm (8 inches) in calibre, whose design parameters were dictated by the Washington Naval Treaty of 1922 and the London Naval Treaty of 1930. Heavy cruisers were generally larger, more heavily armed and more heavily armoured than light cruisers while being smaller, faster, and more lightly armed and armoured than battlecruisers and battleships. Heavy cruisers were not considered capital ships, unlike battlecruisers, battleships, and fleet carriers. Heavy cruisers were assigned a variety of roles ranging from commerce raiding to serving as 'cruiser-killers,' i.e. hunting and destroying similarly sized ships.

The heavy cruiser is part of a lineage of ship design from 1915 through the early 1950s, although the term "heavy cruiser" only came into formal use in 1930. The heavy cruiser's immediate precursors were the light cruiser designs of the 1900s and 1910s, rather than the armoured cruisers of the years before 1905. When the armoured cruiser was supplanted by the battlecruiser, an intermediate ship type between the battlecruiser and the light cruiser was found to be needed—one larger and more powerful than the light cruisers of a potential enemy but not as large and expensive as the battlecruiser so as to be built in sufficient numbers to protect merchant ships and serve in a number of combat theatres.

With their intended targets being other cruisers and smaller vessels, the role of the heavy cruiser differed fundamentally from that of the armoured cruiser. Also, the heavy cruiser was designed to take advantage of advances in naval technology and design. Typically powered by oil-fired steam turbines rather than the reciprocating steam engines of the armored cruiser, heavy cruisers were capable of far faster speeds and could cruise at high speed for much longer than could an armoured cruiser. They used uniform main guns, mounted in center-line superfiring turrets rather than casemates. Casemate guns and a mixed battery were eliminated to make room for above deck torpedoes, and ever-increasing and more effective anti-aircraft armaments. They also benefited from the superior fire control of the 1920s and continually upgraded through the 1950s. Late in the development cycle radar and electronic countermeasures would also appear and rapidly gain in importance.

== History ==
=== Development ===
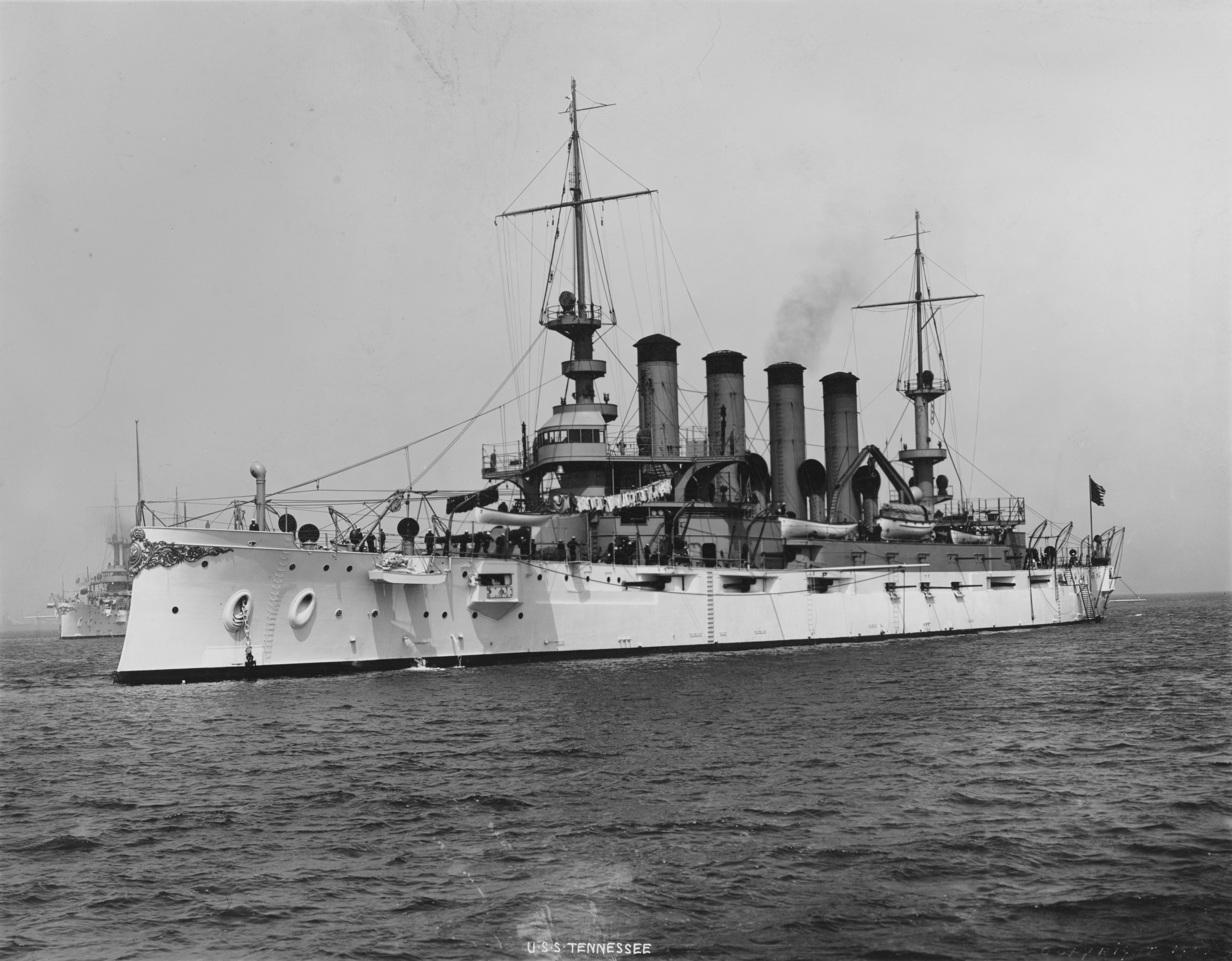
Armoured cruiser USS Tennessee (1906), armed with four 10-inch (250 mm) guns, ca. 1907

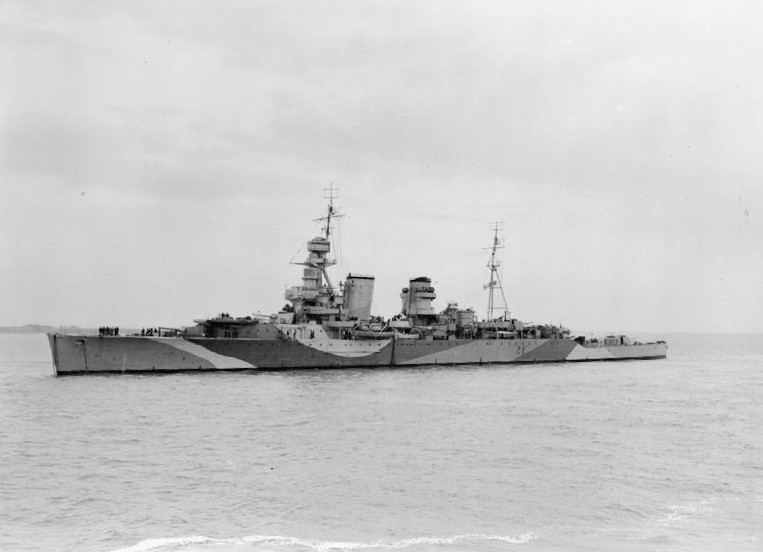
HMS Hawkins, lead ship of her class, commissioned in 1919

At the end of the 19th century, cruisers were classified as first, second or third class depending on their capabilities. First-class cruisers were typically armoured cruisers, with belt side armour, while lighter, cheaper, and faster second- and third-class cruisers tended to have only an armoured deck and protective coal bunkers, rather than armoured hulls; they were hence known as protected cruisers. Their essential role had not changed since the age of sail—to serve on long-range missions, patrol for enemy warships and raid and defend commerce. Armoured cruisers had proved less versatile than needed to do this adequately. In a race to outsize and outgun one another, they had grown to around 15,000 tons and up to 9.2 and 10 inches (230 and 250 mm) in main gun calibre—very close to the pre-dreadnought battleships of the day, although they were generally ascribed to be weaker than the battleship due to their lack of armour and not appreciably faster due to the limits of engine technology at the time. While Japanese armoured cruisers had distinguished themselves at the Battle of Tsushima in 1905, the armoured cruiser as it was then known had reached the pinnacle of its development.

Tactics and technology were gearing towards naval encounters held over increasingly longer ranges, which demanded an armament of primarily large calibre guns. The demand for speed with which to outflank a potential enemy and fulfil its traditional role as scout for the fleet demanded a speed preferably 30 percent faster than battleships. Thirty percent was the ratio by which frigates had been faster than ships of the line in the days of sail. If a battleship sailed at 20 knots, this would mean that an armoured cruiser would have to steam at least 26 or 27 knots.

Armoured cruisers could not fulfil these criteria without being built much larger and taking on a different form than they had in the past. The result was the battlecruiser. HMS Invincible and her two sister ships were designed specifically to fulfil these requirements. In a sense they were an extension of the armoured cruiser as a fast, heavily armed scout, commerce protector and cruiser-destroyer, reflected in the term originally ascribed to them, "large armoured cruiser". However, they were much larger, faster and better-armed than armoured cruisers, able to outpace them, stay out of range of their weapons and destroy them with relative impunity. Because they carried the heavy guns normally ascribed to battleships, they could also theoretically hold their place in a battle line more readily than armoured cruisers and serve as the "battleship-cruiser" for which William Hovgaard had argued after Tsushima. All these factors made battlecruisers attractive fighting units, although Britain, Germany and Japan would be the only powers to build them. They also meant that the armoured cruiser as it had been known was now outmoded. No more were built after 1910 and by the end of World War I, the majority of them had been taken out of active service.

Although Lord Fisher, the man behind the building of Invincible, had hoped to replace practically all forms of cruisers with battlecruisers, they proved to be too costly to build in large numbers. At the same time, the third class cruiser (of about 3,000 tons) started to carry thin steel armour on the outside of its hull and became known as a light cruiser. This new type was then joined by 5,000-ton light cruisers, analogous to the older second-class cruisers. The wide gap between the massive battlecruiser of perhaps 20,000 tons and 305 mm (12-inch) guns and the small light cruiser of up to 5,000 tons and 100 mm (4-in) or 155 mm (6-inch) guns naturally left room for an intermediate type. The first such design was the British 'Atlantic cruiser' proposal of 1912, which proposed a long-range cruiser of about 8,000 tons displacement with 190 mm (7.5-inch) guns. This was a response to a rumour that Germany was building cruisers to attack merchant shipping in the Atlantic with 170mm guns. The German raiders proved to be fictional and the 'Atlantic cruisers' were never built. However, in 1915 the requirement for long-range trade-protection cruisers resurfaced and resulted in the Hawkins class. Essentially enlarged light cruisers, being referred to in contemporary reference works as an "improved Birmingham" type after the 6-inch gunned 5,000-ton second-class light cruisers then entering service, the Hawkins-class cruisers each carried seven 190 mm (7.5-inch) guns and had a displacement just under 10,000 tons.

The difference between these light cruisers and ones that would follow with the heavy cruiser were almost as pronounced as that between the armoured cruiser and the battlecruiser. One reason for this difference was the intended mission of these light/heavy cruisers, which were not intended to serve as a junior battleship, as the armoured cruiser had been, and were not built or designed to serve in that capacity. Armored cruisers were often pressed into the main line of battle against battlecruisers and dreadnought battleships (Battle of the Falkland Islands, Battle of Dogger Bank (1915), Battle of Jutland). By contrast, heavy cruisers and light cruisers were not expected to be deployed as such, although there had been some notable engagements (Battle of the Denmark Strait, Battle of Cape Matapan, Naval Battle of Guadalcanal, Battle of Surigao Strait). The heavy cruiser's main armament of 203 mm (8-inch) guns was smaller than the typical 9.2-or-10-inch (230 or 250 mm) guns of the last armoured cruisers, so their intended targets were other cruisers and smaller vessels. Further reasons for the difference were the advances in technology and naval design, both of which the heavy cruiser was able to take advantage. Heavy cruisers, like all contemporary ships, were typically powered by oil-fired steam turbine engines and were capable of far faster speeds than armoured cruisers had ever been (propelled by coal-fired reciprocating steam engines of their era). Nonetheless, heavy cruisers often had a larger number of main guns (some armoured cruisers had a mixed instead of uniform complement of main guns), discarded the mounting of main guns in casemates in favour of centre-line superfiring turrets (saving tonnage and enabling the ship to fire all guns on one broadside), and benefited from the introduction of fire control in the 1920s and 1930s, meaning that the heavy cruiser was considerably more powerful.

=== Washington Treaty ===
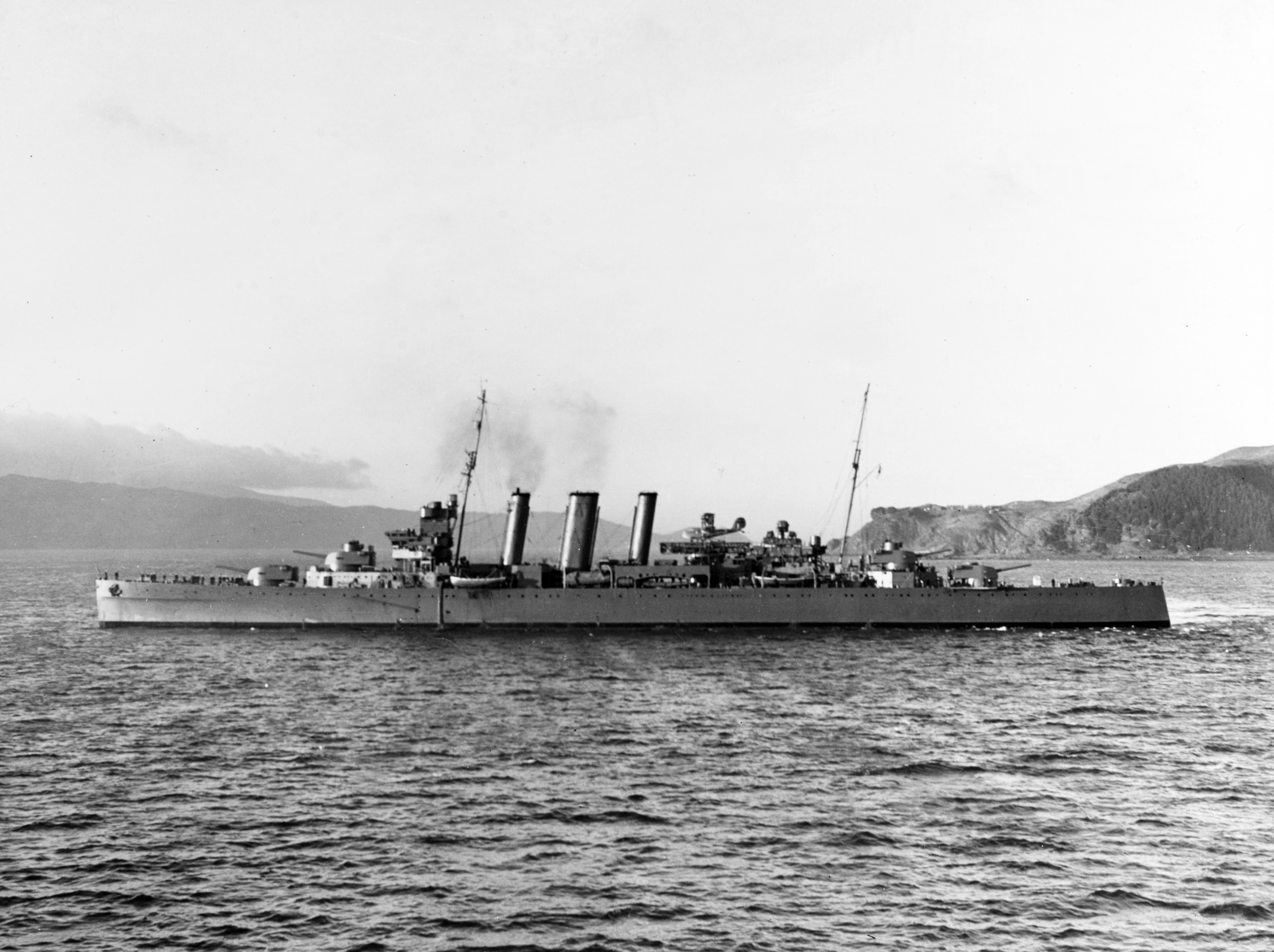
HMAS Canberra, a County-class "treaty cruiser".

The Washington Naval Treaty of 1922 imposed a moratorium on new battleship construction, with the exception of the two Nelson-class battleships by Great Britain, and set very strict limits on the tonnage and firepower of future battleships and battlecruisers. It also set the definition of a capital ship as a warship of more than 10,000 tons standard displacement or with armament of a calibre greater than 8 inches (203 mm). There was the concern that a subsequent race in building larger, more powerful cruisers might subvert the usefulness of the prohibition on capital ship construction and encourage navies to squander their now-limited permissible tonnage for capital ships on fast vessels designed specifically to hunt down large cruisers. To avert these challenges, representatives of the United States, Great Britain, Japan, France and Italy set limits on the tonnage and firepower of cruisers to 10,000 tons in standard displacement and 8 inches for maximum main gun caliber. These limits were in the interests of the U.S. and Britain especially. Planners in the U.S. Navy had spent two years prior to the start of negotiations designing 10,000 ton, 8-inch cruisers and were convinced that smaller vessels would not be worthwhile. Britain had just built its Hawkins-class cruisers and wanted to ensure they would not fall prey to a much larger type of super-cruiser.

Despite these intentions and set limitations, a number of new, powerful cruiser classes emerged from these nations, which sparked off something of a cruiser arms-race. The Japanese navy had a doctrine of building more powerful ships in every class than its likely opponents, which led to the development of several very impressive heavy cruiser classes. British and American building was more influenced by the desire to be able to match the Japanese ships while keeping enough cruisers for their other global responsibilities. With battleships heavily regulated by the Washington Treaty, and aircraft carriers not yet mature, the cruiser question became the focus of naval affairs. The British, with a strained economy and global commitments, favoured unlimited cruiser tonnage but strict limits on the individual ships. The Americans favoured the opposite: strictly limited numbers of powerful cruisers. Disagreements between the British and Americans wrecked the 1927 conference on naval affairs.

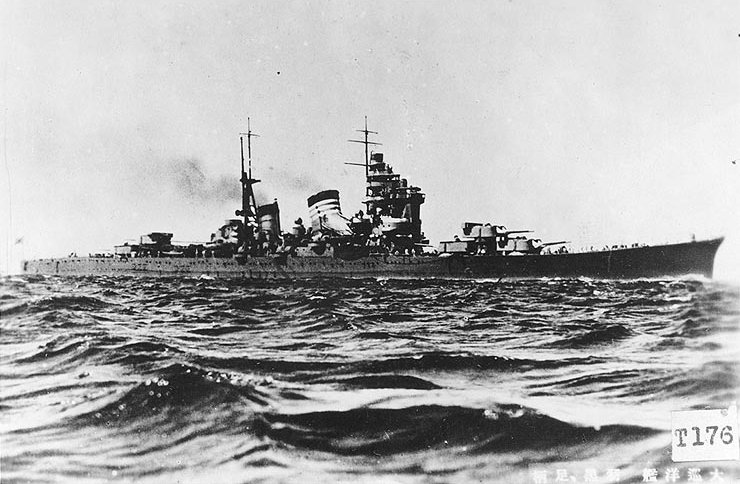
IJN Haguro of the Myōkō class

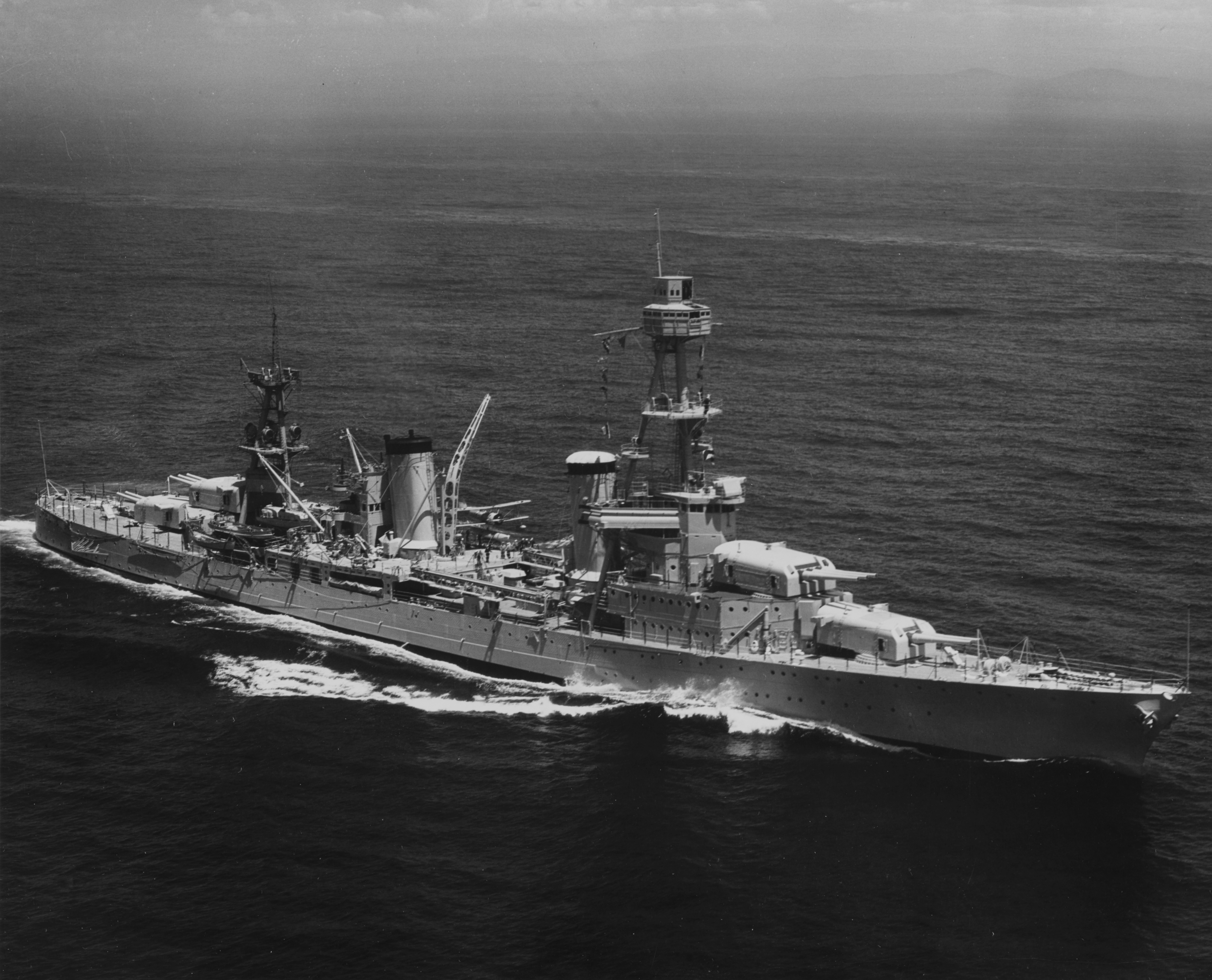
USS Pensacola in 1935

Even during the 1920s, the 10,000-ton limit was not always strictly observed, although British, French and American designers generally worked to the limit with precision. The British built 13 of the County class with four twin 8-inch gun turrets but with very minimal armour. The ships had fine sea-keeping qualities and a long range, but were virtually unprotected, and were easily damaged in combat. The Japanese Myōkō class, however, grew during its construction as the naval general staff prevailed on the designers to increase the weapons load. As well as a breach of the Treaty, this was a poor decision from the design point of view and the ships had to be reconstructed in the 1930s to reduce weight. The German Deutschland class was classified as armoured coast defence ships under the terms of the Treaty of Versailles. They superficially resembled contemporary battleships due to their massive main gun turrets and unusually high conning tower/bridge. However, they were in effect a heavy cruiser being up gunned to 11-inch batteries at the cost of slower speed; their displacement was declared at 10,000 tons but was in practice considerably greater. The Italian Navy first built two Trento-class cruisers, which sacrificed protection for speed, and then four Zara class, a much more balanced and better-protected design, plus an improved replica of the Trentos (Bolzano); all of them, however, surpassed the displacement limit.

The Pensacola-class cruisers were the US Navy's first "treaty cruisers" designed in line with Washington Naval Treaty restrictions. Their main battery consisted of ten 8 in (200 mm) guns, in two twin turrets on the main deck, and two triple turrets two decks above, making it one of the two US Navy ship classes (besides the Nevada-class battleships) to have different-sized turrets for main armament (Subsequent US cruisers would mount nine 8" guns in three triple turrets 2 fore 1 aft). Their thin armour on the belt (varying from 2.5 to 4 inches (64 to 102 mm) in thickness) and deck 1.75 inches (44 mm) was no better than that on 6-inch-gunned cruisers and was inadequate to protect their vitals from enemy 8-inch shells. Also, their unusual main battery layout and heavy tripod fore-masts made these ships top-heavy and prone to excessive rolling. This combined with low freeboard forward made them inferior sea boats compared to later designs. Rework in the shipyards modified the hull and superstructure in the 1930s to eliminate the rolling. The two vessels in this class, Pensacola and Salt Lake City, were originally classified as light cruisers due to their minimal armour until re-designated in July 1931 as heavy cruisers in accord with international practice of designating all cruisers with guns larger than 6".

=== London Treaty ===
In 1930 the Washington Naval Treaty was extended by the London Naval Treaty, which finally settled the arguments on cruisers which had raged in the 1920s. The treaty defined limits on both heavy cruisers – those with guns larger than 155 mm (6.1 inches) – and light cruisers – those with smaller-calibre guns. The limit of 10,000 tons displacement still applied to both. This was the point at which the split between "heavy" and "light" cruisers finally became official and widespread.

The Treaty satisfied Britain and America. However, it deeply offended Japan, as this severely limited the numbers of heavy cruisers that the Imperial Japanese Navy could have, as they considered heavy cruisers as key warships in a line of battle with their 8-inch guns and heavy torpedo armament. The IJN placed less priority on purpose-built light cruisers, most of their existing types dating back to the 1920s (the five World War I-era light cruisers that the IJN commissioned were less well-armed than light cruisers of the US and Royal Navies), which were largely relegated to leading destroyer squadrons. The solution the Japanese adopted was to build the Mogami class, which was declared as a 10,000 ton light cruiser with fifteen 6.1-inch guns. In practice, they displaced over 12,000 tons, had what was effectively a heavy cruiser hull design, and it was always intended to replace her turrets to give a final armament of ten 8.0-inch (203 mm) guns, making something of a nonsense of the light and heavy cruiser classifications. The waters were muddied further when the US Navy ceased laying down keels for new heavy cruisers in 1934 and used their new hull design for the Brooklyn class light cruiser. This type followed in the steps of Mogami by taking what was effectively a heavy cruiser hull and fitting light cruiser guns to it, and while the US Navy never fitted 8-inch guns to their "light" cruisers, the hull design was used as the basis for future heavy cruiser designs.

The German navy also paid lip-service to the treaty limitations, with the Admiral Hipper class displacing 16,170 tons.

In the mid-1930s, Britain, France and Italy ceased building heavy cruisers. It was felt that, in a likely cruiser engagement, a larger number of 155 mm (6-inch) guns would be preferable to a smaller number of 203 mm (8-inch). While the 8-inch gun would inflict more damage when it hit, more 6-inch guns could be carried, likely resulting in more shells on target, and a greater chance of scoring the first hit. This led to the construction of cruisers up to the 10,000-tons limit, with twelve to fifteen 155 mm guns.

The 1936 London Naval Treaty, principally negotiated between Britain and the United States but never ratified, would have abolished the heavy cruiser entirely by restricting new construction to 8,000 tons and 155 mm (6.1-inch) guns. This suited Britain's needs very well, but was largely a dead letter. The U.S. continued to build heavy cruisers, culminating in the New Orleans class and USS Wichita.

=== World War II ===
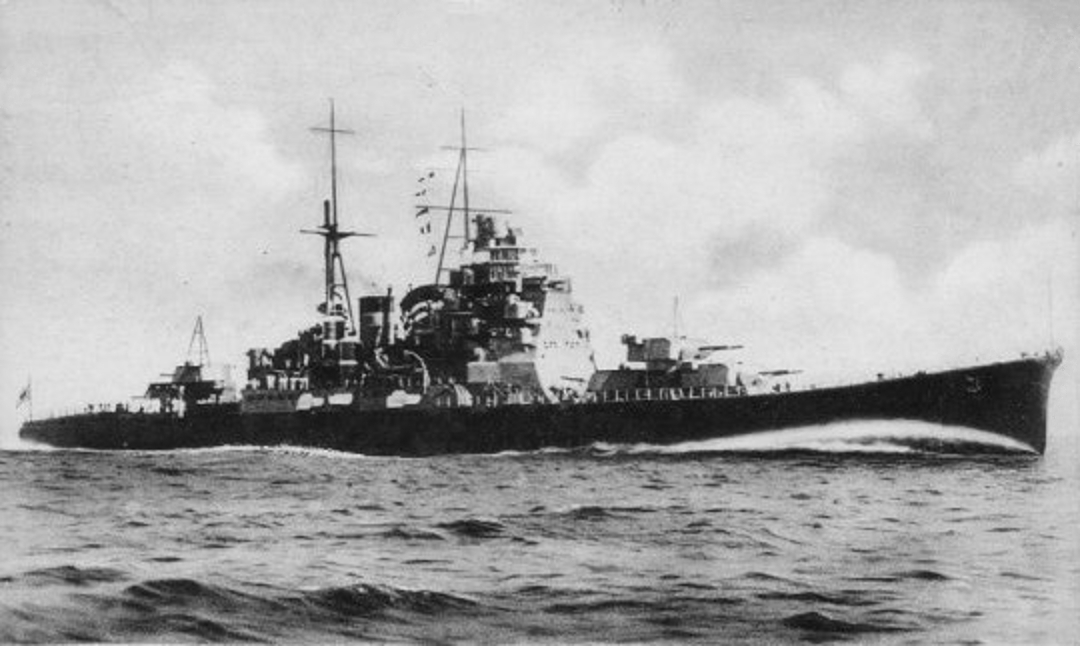
Maya, a Takao-class heavy cruiser

Heavy cruisers were still being built, and they could be balanced designs when nations decided to skirt the restrictions imposed by the London Naval Treaty.

Heavy cruiser order of battle between Japan, the British Empire and the United States.:

- United States (4 classes and 1 ship)
  - 2 Pensacola, 10,000 t, 10 guns
  - 6 Northampton, 2 Portland, 7 New Orleans, 10,000 t, 9 guns
  - Wichita, 10,000 t, 9 guns
- British Commonwealth (5 classes)
  - 7 Kent, 10,000t, 8 guns
  - 4 London, 10,000t, 8 guns
  - 2 Norfolk, 9,925t, 8 guns
  - 3+1 Hawkins, 9,800 t, 7 guns
  - 2 York, 8,400t, 6 guns
- Japan (6 classes)
  - 2 Furutaka, 2 Aoba, 7,000 t, 6 guns
  - 4 Myōkō, 4 Takao, 4 Mogami*, 10,000 t, 10 guns *converted from light cruisers
  - 2 Tone, 10,000 t, 8 guns

Japan was only allowed 12 heavy cruisers by treaty, but had intentionally built the Mogamis with the option to have their main battery changed. The two Tones were also originally planned as light cruisers, but launched after the treaty system broke down with 8-inch guns. At the start of hostilities there was thus a parity between the United States Navy and the Imperial Japanese Navy with respect to heavy cruisers.

The Germans built their Admiral Hipper-class heavy cruisers of 14,000 tons, although the Anglo-German Naval Agreement was supposed to limit their displacement to the 10,000 tons specified by the Washington Naval Treaty.

The US built the Baltimore class of heavy cruisers during the war. While earlier heavy cruisers were noted for their powerful torpedo armament (especially Japanese heavy cruisers), later ships built by the USN concentrated mainly on anti-aircraft armament, as their main role was escorting aircraft carriers and troop transports instead of engaging in surface actions. Most Japanese heavy cruisers were sunk by aircraft or submarines, rather than in surface engagements.

Example of heavy cruiser evolution during the Second World War: Duquesne in original anti-surface layout

Tourville after refit: reinforced anti-air armament, removal of sea plane, torpedo launchers and aft mast

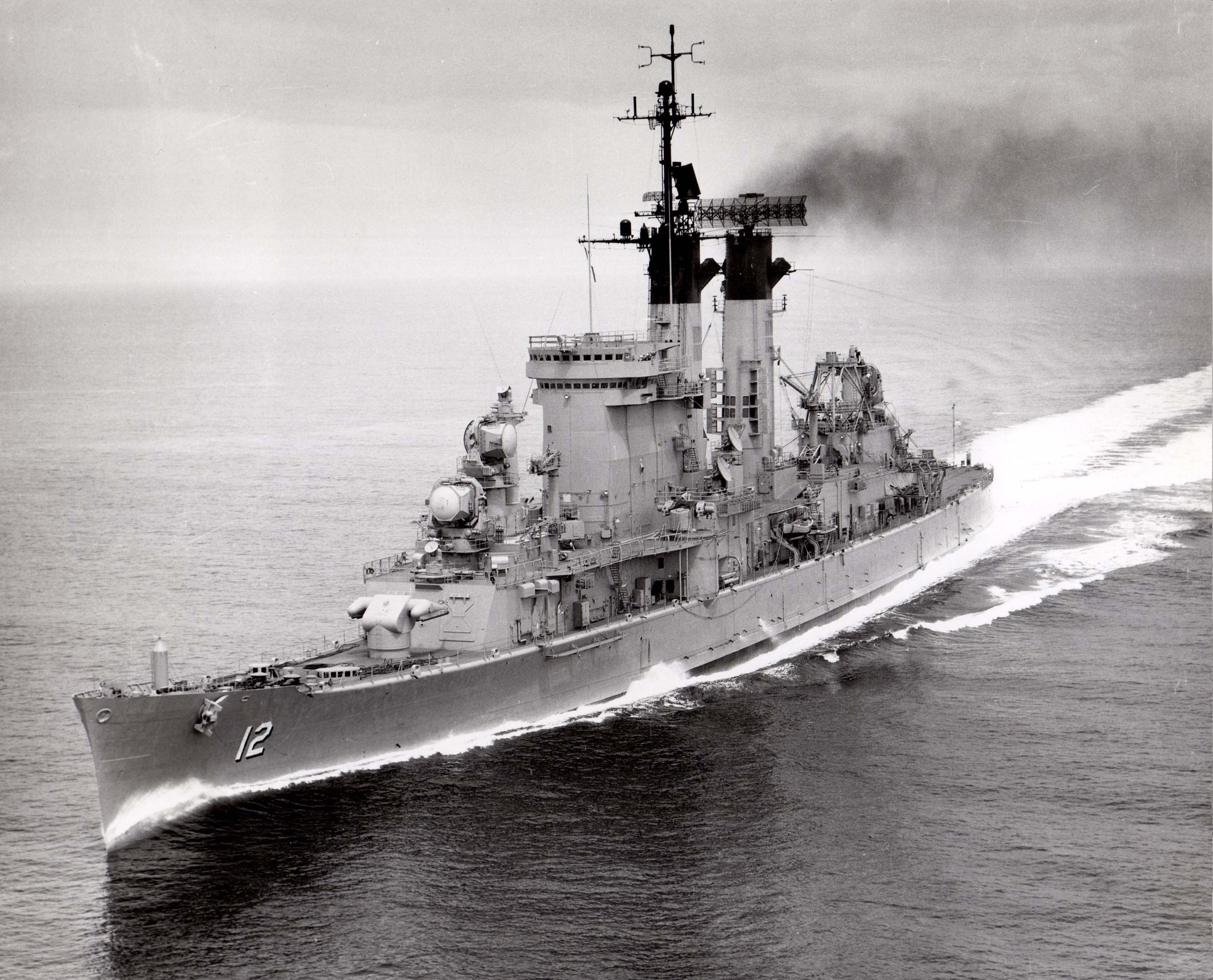
USS Columbus in 1963. Originally a Baltimore-class cruiser, she was rebuilt into an Albany-class guided missile cruiser.

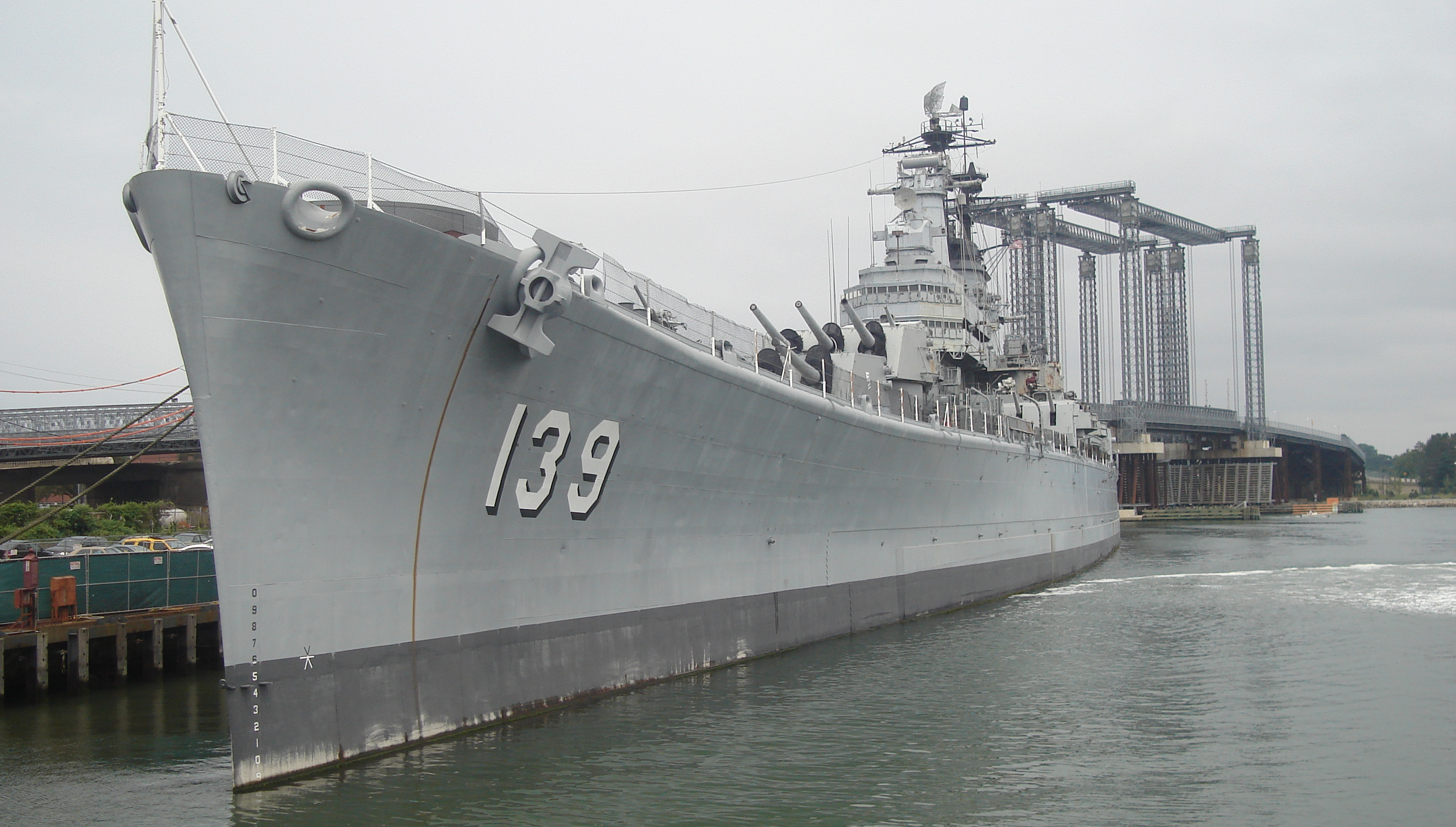
The last remaining heavy cruiser worldwide, USS Salem, as she appeared in 2008

The US built the last heavy cruisers, which were finished shortly after the war. The Baltimore class consisted of seventeen ships, including three of the slightly different Oregon City class. The Des Moines class were the last heavy cruisers built: though based on the Baltimores, they were considerably heavier and longer due to their new rapid-firing 203 mm (8-inch) guns. Additionally, two aircraft carriers were built on a Baltimore-derived hull, the Saipan-class aircraft carrier.

The largest heavy cruisers were the Alaska-class large cruisers, which were designed as "cruiser killers". They resembled contemporary battlecruisers or battleships in general appearance, as well as having main armament and displacement equal or greater than that of capital ships of the First World War. However, the Alaskas were actually upscaled heavy cruisers, as their machinery layout and the possession of a single rudder was based on cruisers rather than that of battleships or battlecruisers. Furthermore, the Alaskas lacked the sophisticated underwater protection system featured in battleships and battlecruisers, making them vulnerable to shells and torpedoes that hit under the waterline. The Alaskas also had proportionately less weight in armour at 28.4% of displacement, in contrast to the British battlecruiser HMS Hood of 30%, the German Scharnhorst and the U.S. Navy's North Carolina-class battleships of 40%. Effectively, the Alaskas were ill-protected to stand up against the guns of true battleships and battlecruisers, and as carrier escorts they were much more expensive than the Baltimores while having only slightly better anti-aircraft capabilities. Given low priority by the USN, only two members of the Alaskas were completed and they saw little service as World War II ended not long after their commissioning.

Heavy cruisers fell out of use after the Second World War, with the Royal Navy decommissioning its last three (HMS London, HMS Cumberland, and HMS Devonshire) by the early 1950s. Some existing US heavy cruisers lasted well through the 1970s, with the last all-gun ship USS Newport News decommissioning in 1975. USS Chicago, USS Columbus and USS Albany, which had been converted to guided missile cruisers (US hull symbol CG), were laid up between 1975 and 1980.

==== Losses ====
- ESP Baleares, Battle of Cape Palos, 6 March 1938
- KM Admiral Graf Spee, Battle of the River Plate, 13 December 1939
- KM Blücher, Battle of Drøbak Sound, 9 April 1940
- RN York, Raid on Souda Bay, 26 March 1941
- RM Zara, Fiume, Pola, Battle of Cape Matapan, 29 March 1941
- USN Houston, gunfire and torpedoes, Battle of Sunda Strait, 1 March 1942
- RN Exeter, Second Battle of the Java Sea, 1 March 1942
- RN Cornwall, Dorsetshire, Indian Ocean Raid, 6 April 1942
- IJN Mikuma, airstrike, Battle of Midway, 6 June 1942
- RM Trento, 14 June 1942
- Guadalcanal campaign
  - USN Astoria, Quincy, Vincennes, gunfire and torpedoes, Battle of Savo Island, 9 August 1942
  - RAN Canberra, Battle of Savo Island, 9 August 1942
  - IJN Kako, torpedoes, aftermath of the Battle of Savo Island, 10 August 1942
  - IJN Furutaka, gunfire and torpedo, Battle of Cape Esperance, 12 October 1942
  - IJN Kinugasa, airstrike, Naval Battle of Guadalcanal, 14 November 1942
  - USN Northampton, torpedoes, Battle of Tassafaronga, 30 November 1942
  - USN Chicago, airstrike, Battle of Rennell Island, 30 January 1943
- French Navy Algérie, Colbert, Foch, Dupleix, Scuttling of the French fleet at Toulon, 27 November 1942
- RM Trieste, airstrike, La Maddalena harbour, 10 April 1943
- Battle of Leyte Gulf
  - IJN Atago, Maya, submarine attack in the Palawan Passage, 23 October 1944
  - Mogami, surface action in the Battle of Surigao Strait and subsequent airstrike, 25 October 1944
  - Chōkai, Suzuya, Chikuma, Battle off Samar, 25 October 1944
- IJN Nachi, airstrike, Manila Harbour, Philippines 4 November 1944
- IJN Kumano, airstrike, Santa Cruz Harbour, Philippines, 25 November 1944
- KM Admiral Scheer, airstrike Kiel, 9 April 1945
- KM Lutzow, airstrike in Swinemunde, 16 April 1945
- KM Admiral Hipper, scuttled in Kiel following airstrike, 3 May 1945
- IJN Haguro, destroyer torpedoes, Battle of the Malacca Strait, 16 May 1945
- IJN Ashigara, submarine, 8 June 1945
- IJN Aoba, Tone, airstrike, Bombing of Kure, 24 July 1945
- USN Indianapolis, submarine torpedoes, 30 July 1945

== Surviving heavy cruisers ==
The last heavy cruiser in existence is the USS Salem, a museum ship in Quincy, Massachusetts.

== See also ==
- BL 7.5 inch Mk VI naval gun prototype heavy cruiser main battery armament
- BL 8 inch Mk VIII naval gun British heavy cruiser armament
- 203mm/50 Modèle 1924 gun Early French heavy cruiser armament
- 203mm/55 Modèle 1931 gun Later French heavy cruiser armament
- 20.3 cm SK C/34 Naval gun German heavy cruiser armament
- 203 mm /50 Model 1924 Early Italian heavy cruiser armament
- 203 mm /53 Italian naval gun Later Italian heavy cruiser armament
- 20 cm/50 3rd Year Type naval gun Japanese heavy cruiser armament
- 180mm Pattern 1931-1933 Soviet heavy cruiser armament
- 8"/55 caliber gun United States heavy cruiser armament
- List of ships of the Second World War
- List of cruisers of the Second World War
- List of cruisers of World War I
- List of heavy cruisers of the Imperial Japanese Navy
- List of United States Navy cruisers § Heavy and light cruisers (CA, CL)
