= 5-inch/25-caliber gun =

20th-century heavy anti-aircraft gun of the U.S. Navy

5"/25 Caliber Gun
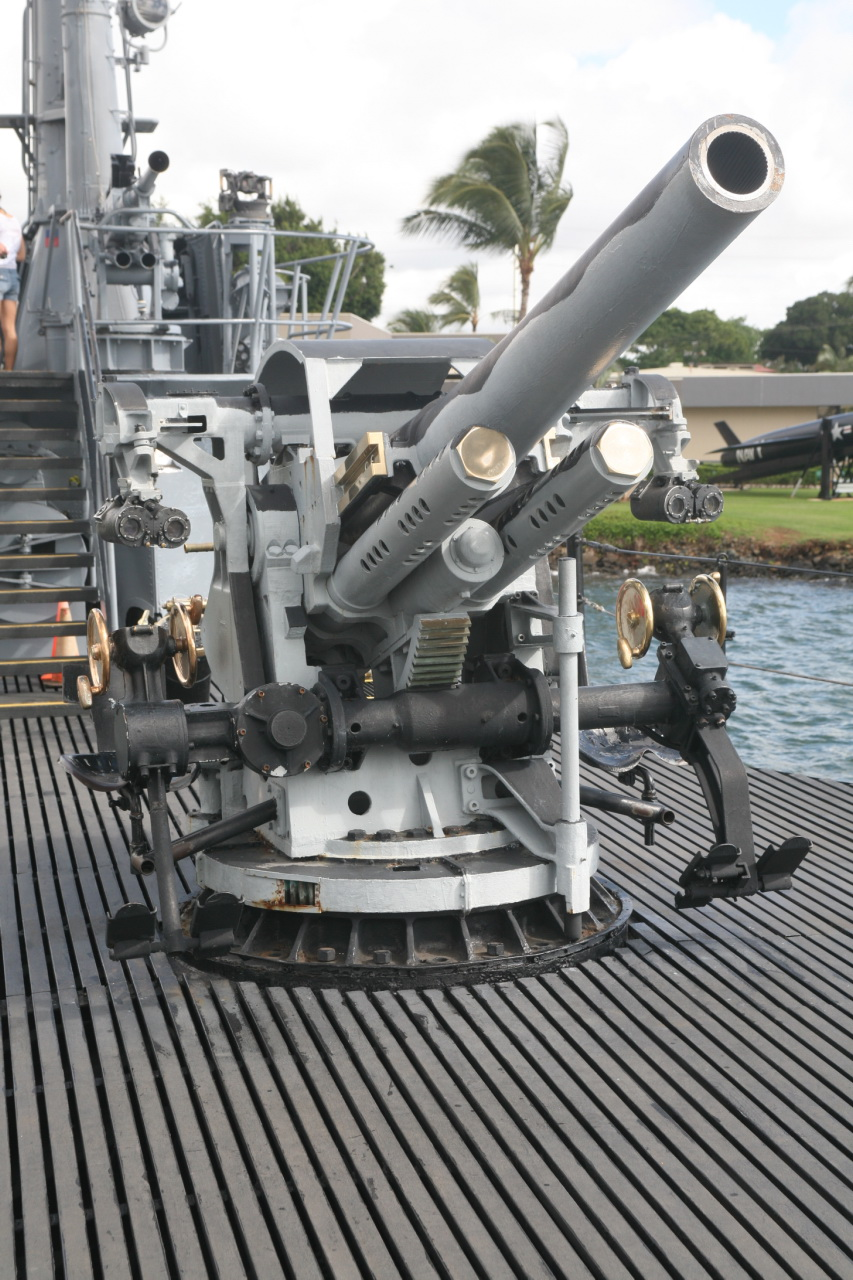
- On the deck of Balao-class submarine USS Bowfin
- Type: Anti-aircraft gun Naval gun
- Place of origin: United States

Service history
- Used by: US Navy, Argentine Navy, Brazilian Navy, Chilean Navy
- Wars: World War II, Falklands War

Production history
- Designed: 1921
- Variants: Mk 10, 11, 13, 17

Specifications
- Mass: 2 metric tons
- Length: 11 ft 10 in (3.6 m)
- Barrel length: 10 ft 5 in (3,175 mm) bore (25 calibers); 8 ft 2 in (2.4 m) rifling
- Shell: 127 × 626 mm R fixed or semi-fixed 52 to 54.5 lb (23.6 to 24.7 kg)
- Caliber: 5 in (127 mm)
- Elevation: -10° to +85°
- Muzzle velocity: 2,100 ft/s (640 m/s) average
- Effective firing range: 14,500 yards (13,300 m) at 40° 27,400 feet (8,400 m) at 85°

The 5"/25 caliber gun (spoken "five-inch-twenty-five-caliber") entered service as the standard heavy anti-aircraft (AA) gun for United States Washington Naval Treaty cruisers commissioned in the 1920s and 1930s. The goal of the 5"/25 design was to produce a heavy AA gun that was light enough to be rapidly trained manually. The gun was also mounted on pre-World War II battleships and aircraft carriers until replaced by the standard widespread dual-purpose 5"/38 caliber gun, which was derived from the 5"/25. Guns removed from battleships were probably converted for submarine use by late 1943, while a purpose-built variant for submarines was available in mid-1944, and was widely used by them. United States naval gun terminology indicates the gun fired a projectile 5 inches (127 mm) in diameter, and the barrel was 25 calibers long (that is, for a 5" bore and a barrel length of 25 calibers, 5" x 25 = 125", or about 3.2 meters). It is referred to sometimes as a dual-purpose gun and sometimes as an anti-aircraft gun, because of its comparative weakness against surface targets.

== History ==
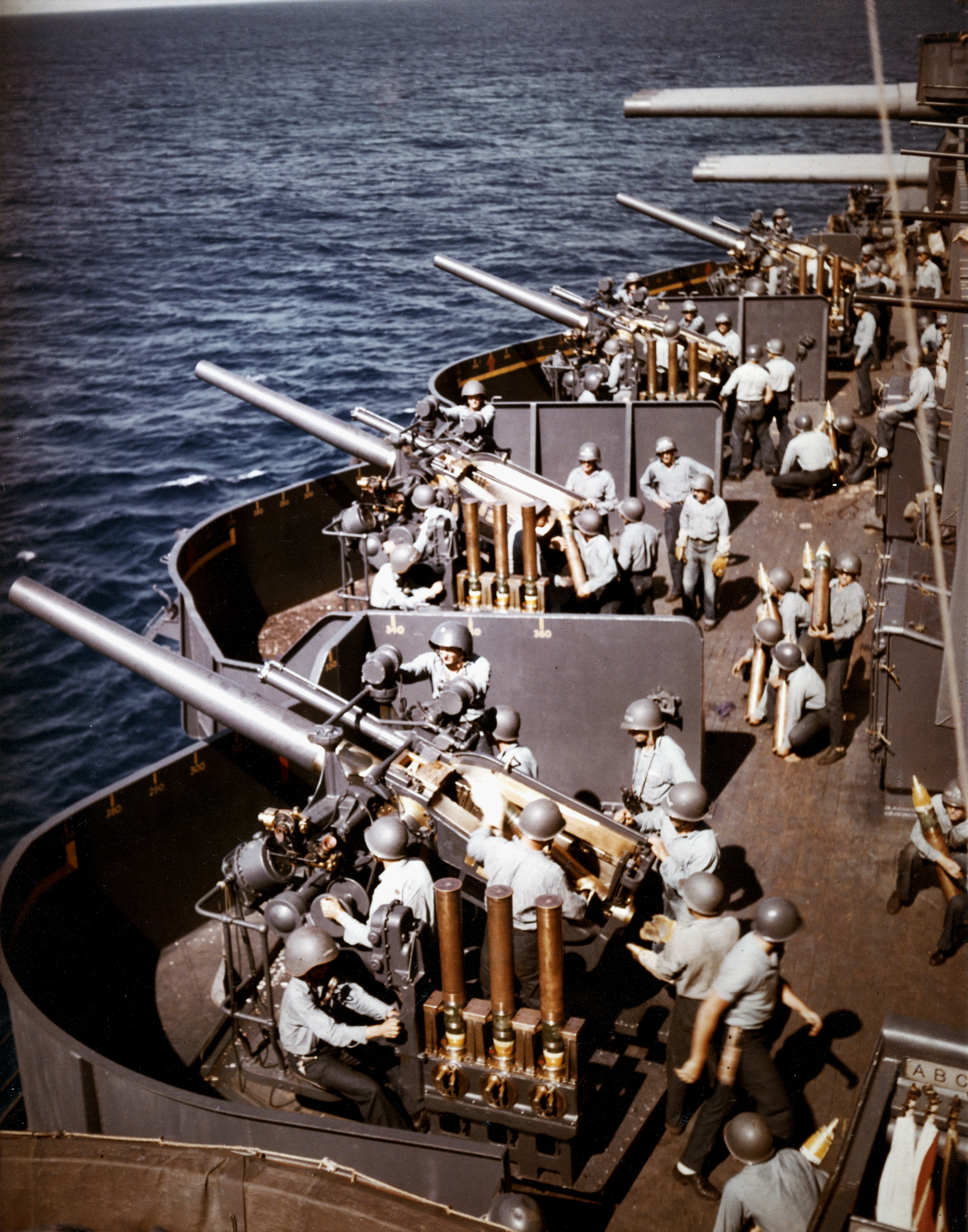
Battleship USS New Mexico's 5"/25 battery prepares to fire during the bombardment of Saipan, 15 June 1944

The gun weighed about 2 metric tons and used fixed ammunition (case and projectile handled as a single assembled unit) with a 9.6-pound (4.4 kg) charge of smokeless powder to give a 54-pound (24 kg) projectile a velocity of 2100 feet per second (640 m/s). The ceiling was 27,400 feet (8,400 m) at the maximum elevation of 85 degrees. Useful life expectancy was 4260 effective full charges (EFC) per barrel. The short barrel of the 5"/25 made it much easier to train manually against fast-moving targets. These guns were manually controlled so the short barrel and light weight made it an early favorite as an anti-aircraft gun. Another key feature was power loading, allowing rapid fire at high elevation angles. The 5"/38 caliber gun replaced the 5"/25 as the anti-aircraft weapon of choice on new construction by the mid-1930s due to its better range, velocity against surface targets, and higher vertical ceiling. The 5"/38 was effectively a compromise between the shorter-barreled 5"/25 (intended primarily for air targets) and the longer-barreled 5-inch/51-caliber gun (intended primarily for surface targets) in order to create a highly-effective dual-purpose naval gun.

5"/25 guns removed from pre-war battleships (especially those rebuilt after Pearl Harbor) had their barrel linings chromed. These guns were remounted for submarine use beginning in late 1943 for extra firepower against small boats and sampans often encountered off the coast of Japan and elsewhere in the Pacific Theater, replacing the earlier 3-inch and 4-inch guns. New production Mark 17 5"/25 guns on the Mark 40 mount designed for submarines became available in mid-1944; USS Spadefish was the first submarine built with this gun. Some submarines had two of these weapons. The Mark 17 gun in the Mark 40 submarine gun mount may have used semi-fixed ammunition (case and projectile handled separately), but existing WW II photographs, drawings of ammunition storage, and museum ships all show fixed ammunition (one piece service round). It had a range of 14,500 yards (13,300 m) at the maximum elevation of 40 degrees. The submarine mounting had manual elevation, train, and loading with no power assist.

From late 1944 some submarines were built or refitted with two of these weapons. The first of these was USS Sennet, commissioned on 22 August 1944. In February–March 1945 she operated with two other two-gun submarines, USS Haddock and USS Lagarto, in a wolfpack with significant success. To further improve the effectiveness of the two-gun configuration, seven submarines were fitted with a Mark 6 "Baby Ford" fire control computer with a Mark 6 stable element to correct for pitch and roll. The first of these was USS Sea Cat, followed by Flying Fish, Entemedor, Sea Dog, Sea Poacher, Sea Robin, and Sennet. However, some of these refits were completed in September 1945, too late to see action.

== Ships mounting 5"/25 caliber guns ==
(all heavy and light cruisers in the list are "treaty cruisers")

(none of the heavy cruisers appear to ever have had their secondary battery upgraded, despite quite a few having been heavily damaged and extensively repaired).

The heavy cruiser Wichita (ca. 1935), the last 2 of the Brooklyn-class light cruisers (ca. 1937), the North Carolina class of battleships (ca. 1937) and the Yorktown-class aircraft carriers (ca. 1934) were originally built with the more modern 5-inch/38 guns.

- 2 Pensacola-class (ca. 1927) heavy cruisers:
  - Pensacola, Salt Lake City
    - two each port and starboard of the forward superstructure
    - two each port and starboard of the aft superstructure
- 6 Northampton-class (ca. 1928) heavy cruisers:
  - Northampton, Chester, Louisville, Chicago, Houston, Augusta
    - four each port and starboard of the aft superstructure
    - originally built with 4 guns and later upgraded
- 2 Portland-class (ca. 1930) heavy cruisers:
  - Portland, Indianapolis
    - same layout as Northampton
- 7 New Orleans-class (ca. 1931) heavy cruisers:
  - New Orleans, Astoria, Minneapolis, Tuscaloosa, San Francisco, Quincy, Vincennes
    - four each port and starboard of the forward superstructure extending past the stacks
- 7 of 9 Brooklyn-class (ca. 1935) light cruisers:
  - Brooklyn, Philadelphia, Savannah, Nashville, Phoenix, Boise, Honolulu
    - four each side adjacent to the forward superstructure extending past the stacks
    - Savannah and Honolulu secondary battery was later upgraded
    - 2 of 9, St. Louis and Helena (ca. 1937), originally built with 5-inch/38 gun mounts.
- 2 Lexington-class (ca. 1921 - 1925) aircraft carriers:
  - Lexington, Saratoga
    - 6 per side
    - replaced with 5-inch/38 guns by May 1942 on Saratoga during a surprise visit to the drydock
    - still on Lexington when sunk in May 1942
- Ranger (ca. 1931)
  - originally built with 8 guns
- 2 Nevada-class battleships:
  - Nevada, Oklahoma
    - 8 installed in 1927-1930 refits
    - replaced with 5-inch/38 guns on Nevada in 1942
- 2 Pennsylvania-class battleships:
  - Pennsylvania, Arizona
    - 8 installed in 1929 refit
    - replaced with 5-inch/38 guns on Pennsylvania in 1943
- 3 New Mexico-class battleships:
  - New Mexico, Mississippi, Idaho
    - 8 installed in early 1930 modernization
    - replaced with 5-inch/38 guns on Idaho in 1944
    - still on New Mexico and Mississippi at the end of the war
- 2 Tennessee-class battleships:
  - Tennessee, California
    - 8 installed in 1928-1930 refits
    - replaced with 5-inch/38 guns in 1943-1944
- 3 Colorado-class battleships:
  - Colorado, Maryland, West Virginia
    - 8 installed in 1928-1930 modernization
    - replaced with 5-inch/38 guns in 1945 on Maryland and during reconstruction on West Virginia
    - still on Colorado at the end of the war
- Gato-class submarines (as a typical upgrade)
- Balao-class submarines (standard)
- Tench-class submarines (standard)

== See also ==
- Deck gun
