= Northampton-class cruiser =

US Navy heavy cruiser class

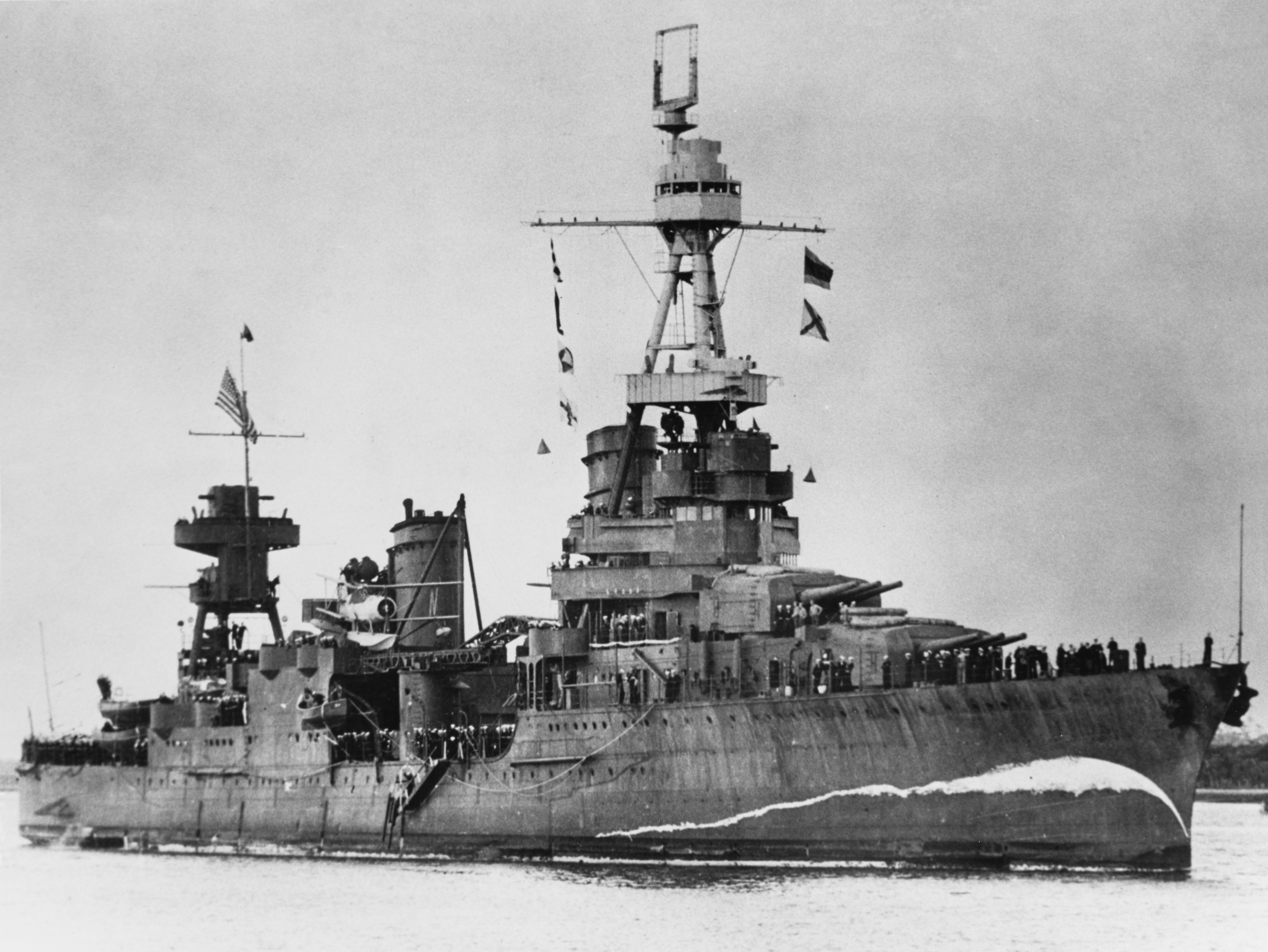
- USS Northampton (CA-26)

Class overview
- Name: Northampton class
- Builders: Bethlehem Fore River, MA (1); New York Shipbuilding, NJ (1); Puget Sound Navy Yard, WA (1); Mare Island Navy Yard, CA (1); Newport News Shipbuilding, VA (2)
- Operators: United States Navy
- Preceded by: Pensacola class
- Succeeded by: Portland class
- Built: 1928-1931
- In commission: 1930-1946
- Completed: 6
- Lost: 3
- Retired: 3

General characteristics (as built)
- Type: Heavy cruiser
- Displacement: 9,050 long tons (9,200 t)
- Length: 582 ft (177 m) wl; 600 ft (180 m) oa
- Beam: 66 ft 1 in (20.14 m)
- Draft: 16 ft 4 in (4.98 m)
- Propulsion: 4 × Parsons turbines; 8 × White-Forster boilers; 4 × screws; 107,000 hp (80,000 kW)
- Speed: 32.5 knots (60.2 km/h; 37.4 mph)
- Complement: 1,100; Officers: 105; Enlisted: 995
- Sensors & processing systems: 2x Mark 24 GFCS (8in); 2x Mark 19 GFCS (5in)
- Armament: 9 × 8 in/55 caliber guns (3× triple turrets); 4 × single 5 in/25 caliber guns; 2 × 3-pounder (47 mm (1.9 in)) saluting guns (removed during wartime); 6 × 21 inches (533 mm) torpedo tubes (removed by 1936)
- Armor: Belt 3.75–1 in (95–25 mm); Barbettes 1.5 in (38 mm); Gunhouses 2.5–0.75 in (64–19 mm); Conning tower: 1 1/4 in (32 mm)
- Aircraft carried: 4 × Seaplanes
- Aviation facilities: 2 × Amidship catapults and Seaplane hangar

The Northampton-class cruisers were a group of six heavy cruisers built for the United States Navy, and commissioned between 1928 and 1931.

The Northamptons saw much action in World War II. Three (Northampton, Chicago, and Houston) were lost during the war. The other three were decommissioned soon after the end of the war, and scrapped in 1959–1961.

== Design ==
The design of the ships was heavily influenced by the Washington Naval Treaty, which limited cruisers to a maximum of 10,000 tons displacement and a maximum main battery caliber of 8 inches (203 mm). The Northamptons aimed to remedy several defects found in the preceding Pensacola class, it was felt that the preceding design sacrificed too much in the way of freeboard and aircraft handling in order to mount ten guns.

The Northamptons mounted nine 8-inch (203 mm) guns in three triple turrets, two forward and one aft, directed by two Mark 24 gun directors, one on the foretop and one in a protected position abaft the funnel. These were eventually replaced by two more modern Mark 34 directors in the surviving ships.

Initially the secondary battery consisted of four 5-inch dual-purpose guns spread around the aft superstructure, as in the preceding class. The decision to double this to eight guns along with installing a pair of Mark 19 directors for them was approved in 1933, but funds were only released in 1938. The four additional guns were mounted on the flight deck abeam the funnel, near the existing anti-aircraft battery. The Mark 19 directors were replaced by more modern Mark 33 directors on the surviving ships during the war.

Initially no light anti-aircraft weaponry was installed, however the installation of eight .50-cal machine guns was approved in 1933. These were intended to be supplemented by up to four quadruple 1.1 in (28 mm) anti-aircraft guns, however initially only 3 in (76 mm) guns were available, with the ships beginning to exchange their 3-inch and .50 caliber guns for 1.1" guns and 20 mm (0.79 in) Oerlikon respectively in early 1942. During the war the 1.1" guns began getting replaced by 40 mm (1.6 in) Bofors guns, with additional Oerlikon guns also being added. By the end of the war the surviving ships had five(Chester and Louisville) or four(Augusta) quadruple Bofors mounts along with 26 Oerlikon in twin mounts(Chester and Louisville) or 22 Oerlikon in single mounts(Augusta).

Two triple 21-inch torpedo tubes were initially carried, however they were ordered removed in 1934 and had been removed by 1936.

Although armor was increased, the Northamptons turned out nearly 1,000 tons below the treaty limitations. Freeboard was increased in the Northamptons by adopting a high forecastle, which was extended aft in the last three for use as flagships. These ships were also the first U.S. ships to adopt a hangar for aircraft, and bunks instead of hammocks. Their lighter-than-expected weight caused them to roll excessively, which necessitated the fitting of deep bilge keels.

== Ships in class ==
Construction data
| Ship name | Hull no. | Builder | Laid down | Launched | Commissioned | Decommissioned | Fate |
|---|---|---|---|---|---|---|---|
| Northampton | CA-26 | Bethlehem Steel Corporation, Fore River Shipyard, Quincy, Massachusetts | 12 April 1928 | 5 September 1929 | 17 May 1930 | —N/a | Sunk in the Battle of Tassafaronga, 30 November 1942 |
| Chester | CA-27 | New York Shipbuilding Corporation, Camden, New Jersey | 6 March 1928 | 3 July 1929 | 24 June 1930 | 10 June 1946 | Struck 1 March 1959; Sold for scrap, 11 August 1959 |
| Louisville | CA-28 | Puget Sound Navy Yard | 4 July 1928 | 1 September 1930 | 15 January 1931 | 17 June 1946 | Struck 1 March 1959; Sold for scrap, 14 September 1959 |
| Chicago | CA-29 | Mare Island Naval Shipyard | 10 September 1928 | 10 April 1930 | 9 March 1931 | —N/a | Sunk during the Battle of Rennell Island, 30 January 1943 |
| Houston | CA-30 | Newport News Shipbuilding and Dry Dock Company | 1 May 1928 | 7 September 1929 | 17 June 1930 | —N/a | Sunk in the Battle of Sunda Strait, 1 March 1942 |
| Augusta | CA-31 | Newport News Shipbuilding and Dry Dock Company | 2 July 1928 | 1 February 1930 | 30 January 1931 | 16 July 1946 | Struck 1 March 1959; Sold for scrap, 9 November 1959 |

== See also ==
- List of cruisers of the United States Navy
