= Pensacola-class cruiser =

American cruiser class

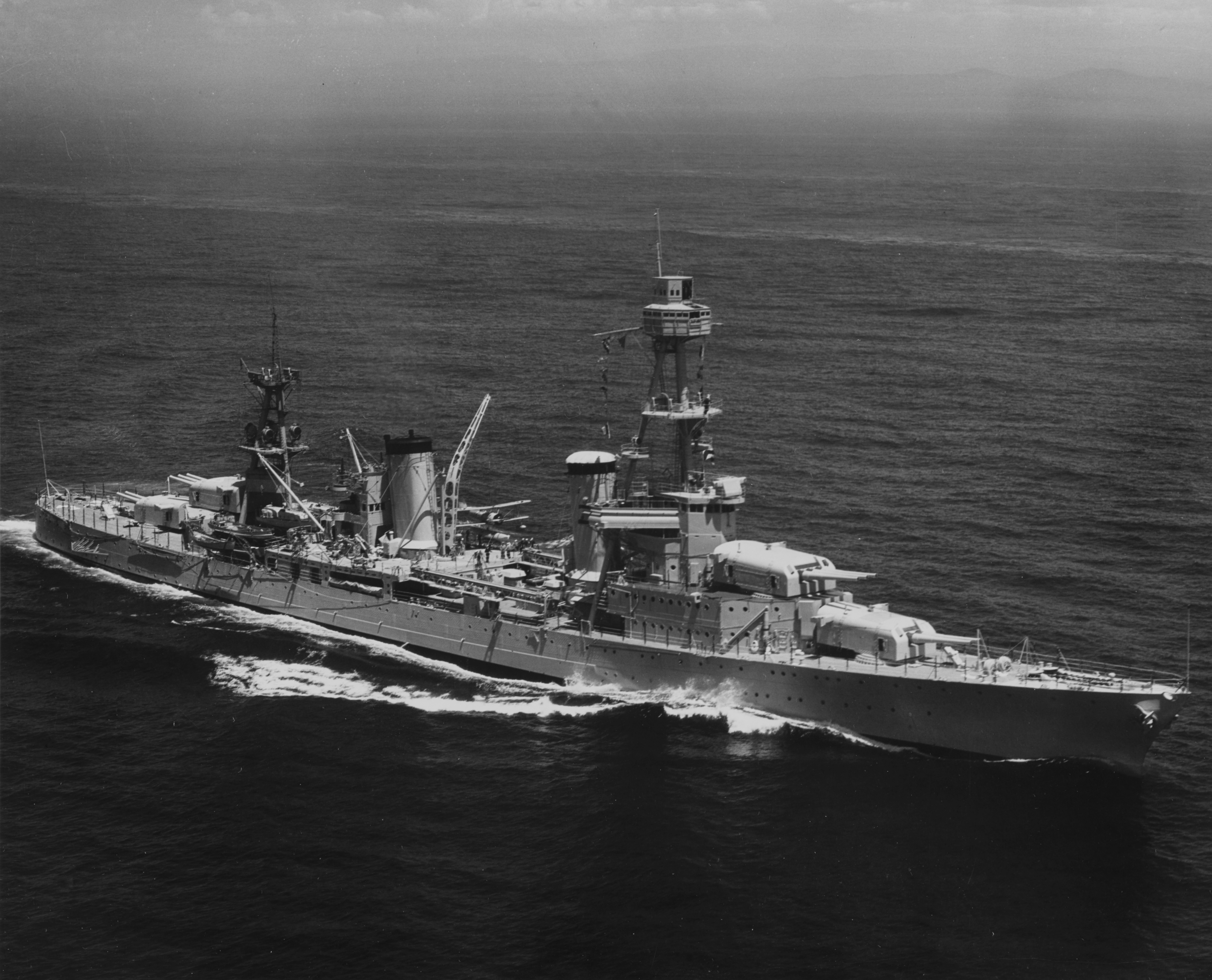
- USS Pensacola (CA-24)

Class overview
- Name: Pensacola-class cruiser
- Builders: New York Navy Yard, NY (1); New York Ship, NJ (1)
- Operators: United States Navy
- Succeeded by: Northampton class
- Built: 1926-1930
- In commission: 1929–1947
- Planned: 2
- Completed: 2
- Retired: 2

General characteristics (as built)
- Type: Heavy cruiser
- Displacement: 9,100 long tons (9,246 t) (standard); 11,512 long tons (11,697 t) (full)
- Length: 570 ft (170 m) wl; 585 ft 6 in (178.46 m) oa
- Beam: 65.0 ft (19.8 m)
- Draft: 19.5 ft (5.9 m)
- Installed power: 8 boilers; 107,000 hp (80,000 kW)
- Propulsion: Steam turbines; 4 Screws
- Speed: 32.5 kn (60.2 km/h; 37.4 mph)
- Complement: 1,200
- Sensors & processing systems: 2x Mark 18 GFCS (8in); 2x Mark 19 GFCS (5in)
- Armament: 10 × 8-inch (203 mm)/55 caliber guns (2×2, 2×3); 4 × single 5-inch (127 mm)/25 caliber guns; 2 × 3-pounder (47 mm (1.9 in)) saluting guns (removed during wartime); 6 × 21 inches (533 mm) torpedo tubes (removed by 1936)
- Armor: Belt: 2.5–4-inch (64–102 mm); Decks: 1–1.75-inch (25–44 mm); Turrets: 0.75–2.5-inch (19–64 mm); Barbettes: 0.75-inch; Conning tower: 1.25-inch (32 mm)
- Aircraft carried: 2 floatplanes
- Aviation facilities: 2 × catapults; No hangars

The Pensacola class was a class of United States Navy heavy cruiser, the first "treaty cruisers" designed under the limitations set by the Washington Naval Treaty, which limited cruisers to a maximum of 10,000 long tons (10,160 t) displacement and a maximum main battery caliber of 8-inch (203 mm).

== Development ==
=== Background ===
Initial efforts to design what would become the Pensacola-class began in 1918 with the launch of the British Hawkins-class cruisers. The US Navy believed the Hawkins-class outclassed all American cruisers that were currently in service: an issue as Great Britain was considered a potential rival. Japan was also identified as a potential threat, and any war in the Pacific would have required uniquely designed ships that could cope with extreme range. To counter both potential adversaries, the new American cruisers needed to exceed the capabilities of the Hawkins-class while possessing the range necessary to operate across the Pacific.

=== Washington Naval Treaty ===
In 1922, the United States and other naval powers signed the Washington Naval Treaty, intended to prevent a naval arms race and foster a sense of disarmament. The treaty limited future cruisers to displace less than 10,000 tons and armed with weapons with a caliber no greater than 8 inches (203 mm). The Pensacola-class was the first American design built to treaty specifications, which allowed American naval architects to experiment with the requirements.

== Description ==
In an effort to remain within treaty limits, while still mounting a very heavy main battery of ten 8-inch (203 mm) guns, the hull was of welded construction, and the armor belt was thin (varying from 2.5 to 4 inches (64 to 102 mm) in thickness). This was inadequate to protect her vitals from enemy 8-inch shells and was no thicker than the armor on 6-inch (152 mm) gun cruisers. In fact, Pensacola and Salt Lake City were classified as light cruisers due to their minimal armor, until re-designated in July 1931 as heavy cruisers in accordance with the provisions of the London Naval Treaty to designate all cruisers with guns larger than 6.1-inch as heavy cruisers.

Their main armament consisted of ten 8-inch guns, in two twin turrets on the main deck, and two triple turrets two decks above, making it one of the two US Navy ship classes (besides the Nevada-class battleships) to have different-sized turrets for main armament. These guns were initially directed by a Mark 18 director on the foretop, Pensacola had this mount replaced during her 1945 refit with a pair of modified Mark 35 directors mounted fore and aft. All the guns in each turret were mounted in a single slide, and were unable to elevate independently of one another. Also, unlike the very few other ships with different-sized main battery turrets (Nevada-class battleships and King George V-class battleships) the Pensacolas had the larger turrets superfiring over the smaller turrets, whereas the others had the larger turrets on "bottom". (Note: the original design for the Lexington-class battlecruiser would have shared this unique arrangement, as they called for ten 14-inch (360 mm) guns, with the triple turrets superfiring over twin turrets, and would have appeared like scaled-up Pensacolas) Placing heavier turrets above lighter ones allows for finer lines for a given length, however causing top-heaviness and reducing stability.

The secondary armament initially consisted of four 5-inch dual-purpose guns in single mounts spread around the aft superstructure. The decision to double this to eight guns along with installing a pair of Mark 19 directors for them was approved in 1933, but funds were only released in 1938. The four additional guns were mounted on the communication platform abeam the bridge. The Mark 19 directors were replaced by more modern Mark 33 directors beginning in 1943.

Initially no light anti-aircraft weaponry was installed, however in 1934 eight .50-cal machine guns were installed on the fore- and mainmasts. By early 1941 these were joined by a quartet of quadruple 1.1 in (28 mm) anti-aircraft guns. During the war these weapons were gradually replaced with 40 mm (1.6 in) Bofors guns and 20 mm (0.79 in) Oerlikon autocannons, with the ships carrying seven(Pensacola) or six(Salt Lake City) quadruple mounts of the former and eighteen in twin mounts(Pensacola) or nineteen in single mounts(Salt Lake City) of the latter by 1945.

Two triple 21-inch torpedo tubes were initially carried, however they were ordered removed in 1934 and had been removed by 1936.

Unfortunately, because of the rather unusual main battery layout and their heavy tripod fore-masts, they were top-heavy and prone to excessive rolling. This combined with low freeboard forward made them inferior seaboats compared to later designs. Rework in the shipyards modified the hull and superstructure in the 1930s to eliminate the rolling.

The Navy built only two ships in this class before switching to the Northampton-class design. Many of the deficiencies of the Pensacolas were corrected by reducing the main battery to three triple turrets (two forward, one aft) and adding another upper deck forward of amidships.

== Ships in class ==
Construction data
Ship name	Hull no.	Builder	Laid down	Launched	Commissioned	Decommissioned	Fate
Pensacola	CA-24	New York Navy Yard, Brooklyn, New York City	27 Oct 1926	25 Apr 1929	6 Feb 1930	26 Aug 1946	Struck, 28 Nov 1945; Sunk as target, 10 Nov 1948
Salt Lake City	CA-25	New York Shipbuilding Corporation, Camden, New Jersey	9 Jun 1927	23 Jan 1929	11 Dec 1929	29 Aug 1947	Struck, 18 Jun 1948; Sunk as target, 25 May 1948

== See also ==
- County-class cruiser, a contemporary class of RN cruisers built to the same Treaty limits
- Furutaka-class cruiser, a contemporary class of IJN cruisers built to the same Treaty limits
- List of cruisers of the United States Navy
