= Ship gun fire-control system =

Type of analogue fire-control system

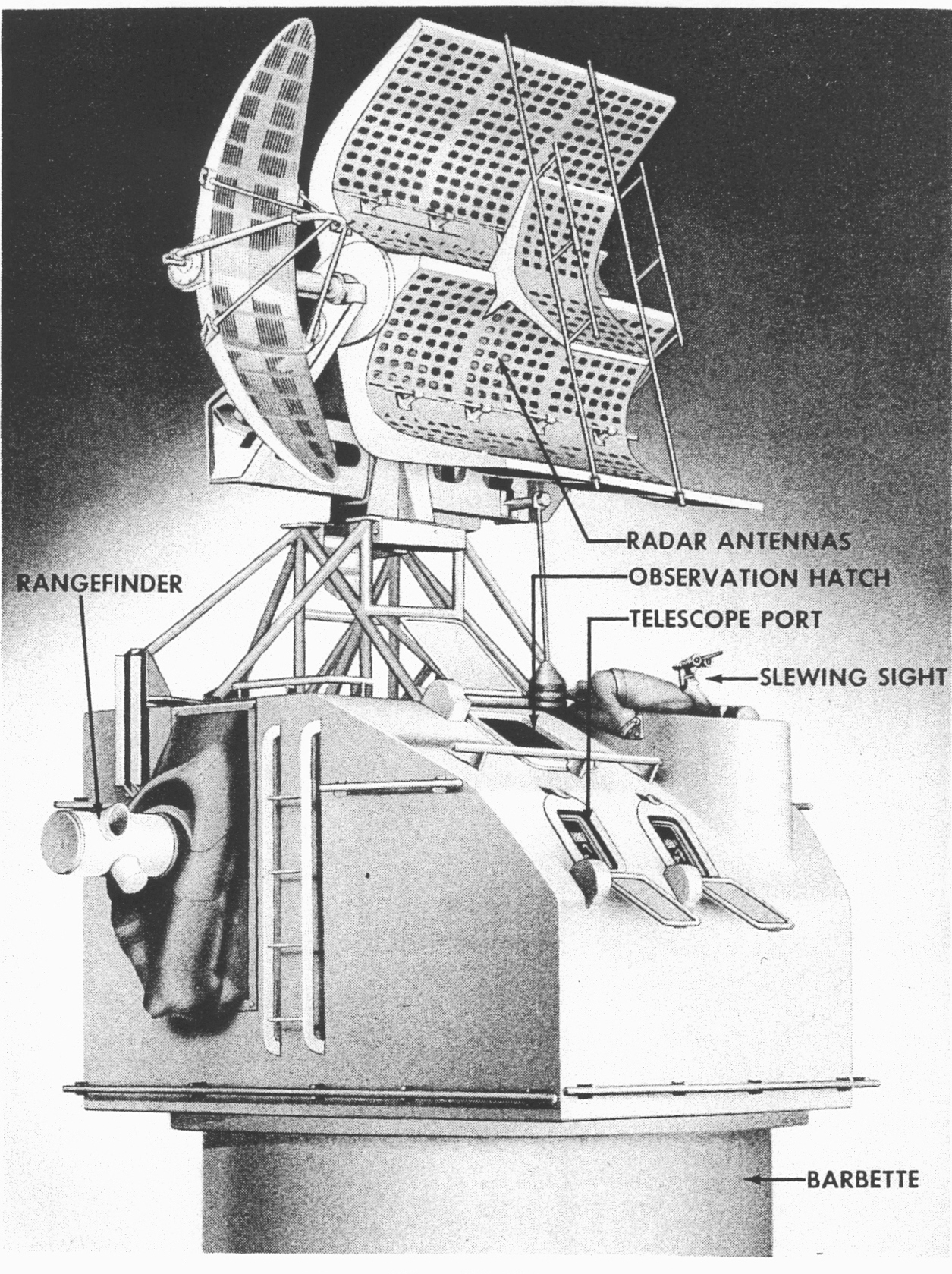
Mark 37 Director c. 1944 with Mark 12 (rectangular antenna) and Mark 22 "orange peel"

Ship gun fire-control systems (GFCS) are analogue fire-control systems that were used aboard naval warships prior to modern electronic computerized systems, to control targeting of guns against surface ships, aircraft, and shore targets, with either optical or radar sighting. Most US ships that are destroyers or larger (but not destroyer escorts except Brooke-class DEGs later designated FFGs or escort carriers) employed gun fire-control systems for 5-inch (127 mm) and larger guns, up to battleships, such as Iowa class.

Beginning with ships built in the 1960s, warship guns were largely operated by computerized systems, i.e. systems that were controlled by electronic computers, which were integrated with the ship's missile fire-control systems and other ship sensors. As technology advanced, many of these functions were eventually handled fully by central electronic computers.

The major components of a gun fire-control system are a human-controlled director, along with or later replaced by radar or television camera, a computer, stabilizing device or gyro, and equipment in a plotting room.

For the US Navy, the most prevalent gunnery computer was the Ford Mark 1, later the Mark 1A Fire Control Computer, which was an electro-mechanical analog ballistic computer that provided accurate firing solutions and could automatically control one or more gun mounts against stationary or moving targets on the surface or in the air. This gave American forces a technological advantage in World War II against the Japanese, who did not develop remote power control for their guns; both the US Navy and Japanese Navy used visual correction of shots using shell splashes or air bursts, while the US Navy augmented visual spotting with radar. Digital computers would not be adopted for this purpose by the US until the mid-1970s; however, it must be emphasized that all analog anti-aircraft fire control systems had severe limitations, and even the US Navy's Mark 37 system required nearly 1000 rounds of 5 in (127 mm) mechanical fuze ammunition per kill, even in late 1944.

The Mark 37 Gun Fire Control System incorporated the Mark 1 computer, the Mark 37 director, a gyroscopic stable element along with automatic gun control, and was the first US Navy dual-purpose GFCS to separate the computer from the director.

== History of analogue fire control systems ==
Naval fire control resembles that of ground-based guns, but with no sharp distinction between direct and indirect fire. It is possible to control several same-type guns on a single platform simultaneously, while both the firing guns and the target are moving.

Though a ship rolls and pitches at a slower rate than a tank does, gyroscopic stabilization is extremely desirable. Naval gun fire control potentially involves three levels of complexity:

- Local control originated with primitive gun installations aimed by the individual gun crews.
- The director system of fire control was incorporated first into battleship designs by the Royal Navy in 1912. All guns on a single ship were laid from a central position placed as high as possible above the bridge. The director became a design feature of battleships, with Japanese "Pagoda-style" masts designed to maximize the view of the director over long ranges. A fire control officer who ranged the salvos transmitted elevations and angles to individual guns.
- Coordinated gunfire from a formation of ships at a single target was a focus of battleship fleet operations. An officer on the flagship would signal target information to other ships in the formation. This was necessary to exploit the tactical advantage when one fleet succeeded in crossing the T of the enemy fleet, but the difficulty of distinguishing the splashes made walking the rounds in on the target more difficult.

Corrections can be made for surface wind velocity, roll and pitch of the firing ship, powder magazine temperature, drift of rifled projectiles, individual gun bore diameter adjusted for shot-to-shot enlargement, and rate-of-change of range with additional modifications to the firing solution based upon the observation of preceding shots. More sophisticated fire control systems consider more of these factors rather than relying on simple correction of observed fall of shot. Differently colored dye markers were sometimes included with large shells so individual guns, or individual ships in formation, could distinguish their shell splashes during daylight. Early "computers" were people using numerical tables.

=== Pre-dreadnought control system ===
The Royal Navy was aware of the fall of shot observation advantage of salvo firing through several experiments as early as 1870 when Commander John A. Fisher installed an electric system enabling a simultaneous firing of all the guns to HMS Ocean, the flagship of the China Station as the second in command. (Note: See John Fisher, 1st Baron Fisher#Commander (1869–1876) for details.) However, the Station or Royal Navy had not yet implemented the system fleet-wide in 1904. The Royal Navy considered Russia a potential adversary through The Great Game, and sent Lieutenant Walter Lake of the Navy Gunnery Division and Commander Walter Hugh Thring of the Coastguard and Reserves, the latter with an early example of Dumaresq, to Japan during the Russo-Japanese War. Their mission was to guide and train the Japanese naval gunnery personnel in the latest technological developments, but more importantly for the Imperial Japanese Navy (IJN), they were well aware of the experiments.

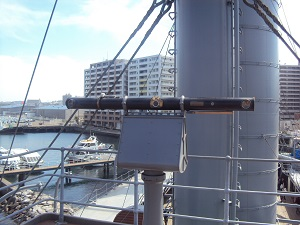
Barr & Stroud 1.5–metre rangefinder, on display at Mikasa Park, Yokosuka, Japan

During the 10 August 1904 Battle of the Yellow Sea against the Russian Pacific Fleet, the British-built IJN battleship Asahi and her sister ship, the fleet flagship Mikasa, were equipped with the latest Barr and Stroud range finders on the bridge, but the ships were not designed for coordinated aiming and firing. Asahi's chief gunnery officer, Hiroharu Kato (later Commander of Combined Fleet), experimented with the first director system of fire control, using speaking tube (voicepipe) and telephone communication from the spotters high on the mast to his position on the bridge where he performed the range and deflection calculations, and from his position to the 12-inch (305 mm) gun turrets forward and astern.

With the semi-synchronized salvo firing upon his voice command from the bridge, the spotters using stopwatches on the mast could identify the distant salvo of splashes created by the shells from their own ship more effectively than trying to identify a single splash among the many. (Note: Different dye-colors were used by the ships in a fleet-to-fleet combat, but the same color was used by the guns on the same ship sometimes with a similar firing timing. The range of the latest 12-inch (305 mm) guns was extended to 7–8 mi (11–13 km) from the previous 4–6 mi (6.4–9.7 km). Rangefinders on Asahi and Mikasa had a range of only 6,000 yd (3.4 mi).) Kato gave the firing order consistently at a particular moment in the rolling and pitching cycles of the ship, simplifying firing and correction duties formerly performed independently with varying accuracy using artificial horizon gauges in each turret. (Note: Unlike modern attitude indicators on airplanes with a gyro, the naval artificial horizon gauges of the time (called 'inclinometer' or 'clinometer') were not much more than "a glass of water on the table" to measure the ship's rolling and pitching angles. When they are made sensitive to the changes, indicator oscillation and error on firing shocks became large, and when the indicator movement is damped with a liquid of less viscosity to make reading easier, the indication lagged the actual changes in attitude. So the use of a single sensitive inclinometer on the bridge "while the main guns are not firing" had an advantage.) Moreover, unlike in the gun turrets, he was steps away from the ship commander giving orders to change the course and the speed in response to the incoming reports on target movements.

Kato was transferred to the fleet flagship Mikasa as the Chief Gunnery Officer, and his primitive control system was in fleet-wide operation by the time the Combined Fleet destroyed the Russian Baltic Fleet (renamed the 2nd and 3rd Pacific Fleet) in the Battle of Tsushima during 27–28 May 1905.

=== Central fire control and World War I ===
Centralized naval fire control systems were first developed around the time of World War I. Local control had been used up until that time, and remained in use on smaller warships and auxiliaries through World War II. Specifications of HMS Dreadnought were finalized after the report on the Battle of Tsushima was submitted by the official observer to IJN onboard Asahi, Captain Pakenham (later Admiral), who observed how Kato's system worked firsthand. From this design on, large warships had a main armament of one size of gun across a number of turrets (which made corrections simpler still), facilitating central fire control via electric triggering.

The UK built their first central system before the Great War. At the heart was an analogue computer designed by Commander (later Admiral Sir) Frederic Charles Dreyer that calculated range rate, the rate of change of range due to the relative motion between the firing and target ships. The Dreyer Table was to be improved and served into the interwar period at which point it was superseded in new and reconstructed ships by the Admiralty Fire Control Table. (Note: For a description of an Admiralty Fire Control Table in action: Cooper, Arthur. "A Glimpse at Naval Gunnery". Ahoy: Naval, Maritime, Australian History.)

The use of Director-controlled firing together with the fire control computer moved the control of the gun laying from the individual turrets to a central position (usually in a plotting room protected below armor), although individual gun mounts and multi-gun turrets could retain a local control option for use when battle damage prevented the director setting the guns. Guns could then be fired in planned salvos, with each gun giving a slightly different trajectory. Dispersion of shot caused by differences in individual guns, individual projectiles, powder ignition sequences, and transient distortion of ship structure was undesirably large at typical naval engagement ranges. Directors high on the superstructure had a better view of the enemy than a turret mounted sight, and the crew operating it were distant from the sound and shock of the guns.

=== Analogue computed fire control ===
Unmeasured and uncontrollable ballistic factors like high altitude temperature, humidity, barometric pressure, wind direction and velocity required final adjustment through observation of fall of shot. Visual range measurement (of both target and shell splashes) was difficult prior to availability of radar. The British favoured coincidence rangefinders while the Germans and the US Navy, stereoscopic type. The former were less able to range on an indistinct target but easier on the operator over a long period of use, the latter the reverse.

During the Battle of Jutland, while the British were thought by some to have the finest fire control system in the world at that time, only three percent of their shots actually struck their targets. At that time, the British primarily used a manual fire control system. This experience contributed to computing rangekeepers becoming standard issue. (Note: The British fleet's performance at Jutland has been a subject of much analysis and there were many contributing factors. When compared to the later long-range gunnery performance by the US Navy and Kriegsmarine, the British gunnery performance at Jutland is not that poor. In fact, long range gunnery is notorious for having a low hit percentage. For example, during exercises in 1930 and 1931, US battleships had hit percentages in the 4–6% range (Bill Jurens).)

The US Navy's first deployment of a rangekeeper was on USS Texas in 1916. Because of the limitations of the technology at that time, the initial rangekeepers were crude. For example, during World War I the rangekeepers would generate the necessary angles automatically but sailors had to manually follow the directions of the rangekeepers. This task was called "pointer following" but the crews tended to make inadvertent errors when they became fatigued during extended battles. During World War II, servomechanisms (called "power drives" in the US Navy) were developed that allowed the guns to automatically steer to the rangekeeper's commands with no manual intervention, though pointers still worked even if automatic control was lost. The Mark 1 and Mark 1A computers contained approximately 20 servomechanisms, mostly position servos, to minimize torque load on the computing mechanisms.

=== Radar and World War II ===
During their long service life, rangekeepers were updated often as technology advanced and by World War II they were a critical part of an integrated fire control system. The incorporation of radar into the fire control system early in World War II provided ships with the ability to conduct effective gunfire operations at long range in poor weather and at night. (Note: The degree of updating varied by country. For example, the US Navy used servomechanisms to automatically steer their guns in both azimuth and elevation. The Germans used servomechanisms to steer their guns only in elevation, and the British did not use servomechanisms for this function at all for battleship main armament. But many Royal Navy battleships and cruisers were fitted with remote power control (RPC) via servomotors for secondary and primary armament, by the end of the war, with RPC first appearing on Vickers 40 mm (2 in) (Pom Pom) 4– and 8–barrel mounts in late 1941.)

In a typical World War II British ship the fire control system connected the individual gun turrets to the director tower (where the sighting instruments were) and the analogue computer in the heart of the ship. In the director tower, operators trained their telescopes on the target; one telescope measured elevation and the other bearing. Rangefinder telescopes on a separate mounting measured the distance to the target. These measurements were converted by the Fire Control Table into bearings and elevations for the guns to fire on. In the turrets, the gunlayers adjusted the elevation of their guns to match an indicator which was the elevation transmitted from the Fire Control Table—a turret layer did the same for bearing. When the guns were on target they were centrally fired.

The Aichi Clock Company first produced the Type 92 Shagekiban low angle analog computer in 1932. The US Navy Rangekeeper and the Mark 38 GFCS had an edge over Imperial Japanese Navy systems in operability and flexibility. The US system allowing the plotting room team to quickly identify target motion changes and apply appropriate corrections. The newer Japanese systems such as the Type 98 Hoiban and Shagekiban on the Yamato class were more up to date, which eliminated the Sokutekiban, but it still relied on seven operators.

In contrast to US radar aided system, the Japanese relied on averaging optical rangefinders, lacked gyros to sense the horizon, and required manual handling of follow-ups on the Sokutekiban, Shagekiban, Hoiban as well as guns themselves. This could have played a role in Center Force's battleships' dismal performance in the Battle off Samar in October 1944.

In that action, American destroyers pitted against the world's largest armored battleships and cruisers dodged shells for long enough to close to within torpedo firing range, while lobbing hundreds of accurate automatically aimed 5-inch (127 mm) rounds on target. Cruisers did not land hits on splash-chasing escort carriers until after an hour of pursuit had reduced the range to 5 miles (8.0 km). Although the Japanese pursued a doctrine of achieving superiority at long gun ranges, one cruiser fell victim to secondary explosions caused by hits from the carriers' single 5-inch guns. Eventually with the aid of hundreds of carrier based aircraft, a battered Center Force was turned back just before it could have finished off survivors of the lightly armed task force of screening escorts and escort carriers of Taffy 3. The earlier Battle of Surigao Strait had established the clear superiority of US radar-assisted systems at night.

The rangekeeper's target position prediction characteristics could be used to defeat the rangekeeper. For example, many captains under long range gun attack would make violent maneuvers to "chase salvos." A ship that is chasing salvos is maneuvering to the position of the last salvo splashes. Because the rangekeepers are constantly predicting new positions for the target, it is unlikely that subsequent salvos will strike the position of the previous salvo. The direction of the turn is unimportant, as long as it is not predicted by the enemy system. Since the aim of the next salvo depends on observation of the position and speed at the time the previous salvo hits, that is the optimal time to change direction. Practical rangekeepers had to assume that targets were moving in a straight-line path at a constant speed, to keep complexity to acceptable limits. A sonar rangekeeper was built to include a target circling at a constant radius of turn, but that function had been disabled.

Only the RN and USN achieved 'blindfire' radar fire-control, with no need to visually acquire the opposing vessel. The Axis powers all lacked this capability. Classes such as Iowa and South Dakota battleships could lob shells over visual horizon, in darkness, through smoke or weather. American systems, in common with many contemporary major navies, had gyroscopic stable vertical elements, so they could keep a solution on a target even during maneuvers. By the start of World War II British, German and American warships could both shoot and maneuver using sophisticated analog fire-control computers that incorporated gyro compass and gyro Level inputs. In the Battle of Cape Matapan the British Mediterranean Fleet using radar ambushed and mauled an Italian fleet, although actual fire was under optical control using starshell illumination. At the Naval Battle of Guadalcanal USS Washington, in complete darkness, inflicted fatal damage at close range on the battleship Kirishima using a combination of optical and radar fire-control; comparisons between optical and radar tracking, during the battle, showed that radar tracking matched optical tracking in accuracy, while radar ranges were used throughout the battle.

The last combat action for the analog rangekeepers, at least for the US Navy, was in the 1991 Persian Gulf War when the rangekeepers on the Iowa-class battleships directed their last rounds in combat.

== British Royal Navy systems ==
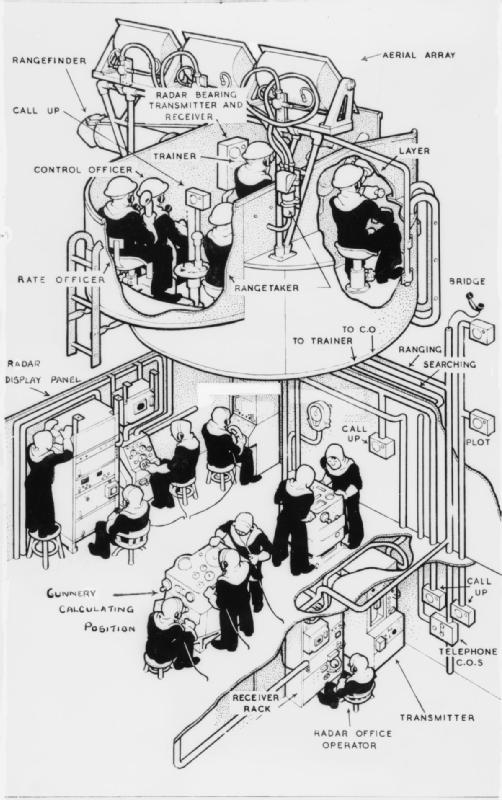
Cut-away view of a RN K-class destroyer Director Control Tower with Type 285 radar. The below decks Fuze Keeping Clock is shown in the centre of the drawing and is labelled "Gunnery Calculating Position", with the deflection operator seated.

- Dreyer Table
- Arthur Pollen's Argo Clock
- Admiralty Fire Control Table – from 1920s
- HACS – A/A system from 1931
- Fuze Keeping Clock – simplified HACS A/A system for destroyers from 1938
- Pom-Pom Director – pioneered use of gyroscopic tachymetric fire-control for short range weapons – From 1940
- Gyro Rate Unit – pioneered use of gyroscopic Tachymetric fire-control for medium calibre weapons – From 1940
- Royal Navy radar – pioneered the use of radar for A/A fire-control and centimetric radar for surface fire-control – from 1939
- Ferranti Computer Systems developed the GSA4 digital computerised gunnery fire control system that was deployed on HMS Amazon (Type 21 frigate commissioned in 1974) as part of the WAS4 (Weapon Systems Automation - 4) system.
- BAE Systems' Sea Archer – computerised gunnery system. The first successful live firing trials of the computerised gunnery system that led to Sea Archer were conducted in July 1975 at the HMS Cambridge gunnery school, Wembury, Plymouth. Sea Archer first went to sea in 1983 on HMS Peacock. Royal Navy designation was GSA.7 from 1980 and GSA.8 from 1985. Production was completed for Royal Navy Type 23 frigates in 1999. Remains in active service as of 2022 on Type 23 (Duke class). Replaced in 2012 on Type 45 destroyers by Ultra Electronics Series 2500 Electro-Optical Gun Control System.

== US Navy analogue Gun Fire Control Systems (GFCS) ==
=== Mark 33 GFCS ===
The Mark 33 GFCS was a power-driven fire control director, less advanced than the Mark 37. The Mark 33 GFCS used a Mark 10 Rangekeeper, analog fire-control computer. The entire rangekeeper was mounted in an open director rather than in a separate plotting room as in the RN HACS, or the later Mark 37 GFCS, and this made it difficult to upgrade the Mark 33 GFCS. It could compute firing solutions for targets moving at up to 320 knots (590 km/h; 370 mph), or 400 knots (740 km/h; 460 mph) in a dive. Its installations started in the late 1930s on destroyers, cruisers and aircraft carriers with two Mark 33 directors mounted fore and aft of the island. They had no fire-control radar initially, and were aimed only by sight. After 1942, some of these directors were enclosed and had a Mark 4 fire-control radar added to the roof of the director, while others had a Mark 4 radar added over the open director. With the Mark 4 large aircraft at up to 40,000 yards could be targeted. It had less range against low-flying aircraft, and large surface ships had to be within 30,000 yards (27,000 m). With radar, targets could be seen and hit accurately at night, and through weather. The Mark 33 and 37 systems used tachymetric target motion prediction. The USN never considered the Mark 33 to be a satisfactory system, but wartime production problems, and the added weight and space requirements of the Mark 37 precluded phasing out the Mark 33:

Although superior to older equipment, the computing mechanisms within the range keeper ([Mark 10]) were too slow, both in reaching initial solutions on first picking up a target and in accommodating frequent changes in solution caused by target maneuvers. The [Mark 33] was thus distinctly inadequate, as indicated to some observers in simulated air attack exercises prior to hostilities. However, final recognition of the seriousness of the deficiency and initiation of replacement plans were delayed by the below decks space difficulty, mentioned in connection with the [Mark 28] replacement. Furthermore, priorities of replacements of older and less effective director systems in the crowded wartime production program were responsible for the fact the [Mark 33's] service was lengthened to the cessation of hostilities.

The Mark 33 was used as the main director on some destroyers and as secondary battery / anti-aircraft director on larger ships (i.e. in the same role as the later Mark 37). The guns controlled by it were typically 5 inch weapons: the 5-inch/25 or 5-inch/38.

==== Deployment ====
- Destroyers (1 per vessel, total 48)
  - 8 Farragut class (launched c. 1934)
  - 18 Mahan class (c. 1935) (Cassin, Downes later rebuilt with Mk 37)
  - 4 Gridley class (c. 1937)
  - 8 Bagley class (c. 1937)
  - 10 Benham class (c. 1938)
- Heavy cruisers (30 total)
  - 2 Pensacola class (2 per vessel, as upgrade)
  - surviving Northampton class (2 per vessel, as upgrade)
  - 2 Portland class (2 per vessel, as upgrade)
  - 7 New Orleans class (launched c. 1933) (2 per vessel, 14 total): for the 5-inch/25 secondary battery
  - Wichita (1937) (2x): for the 5-inch/38 secondary battery
- Light cruisers (18 total)
  - 9 Brooklyn class (launched c. 1937) (2 per vessel, 18 total): for the 5-inch/25 and 5-inch/38 secondary batteries
- Aircraft carriers (8 total)
  - Ranger (2x)
  - 2 Yorktown class (2 per vessel, 4 total)
  - Wasp (2x)
- Battleships (8 total)
  - 3 New Mexico class (2 per vessel, 6 total)
  - Colorado (2x)

=== Mark 34 GFCS ===
The Mark 34 was used to control the main batteries of large gun ships. Its predecessors include Mk18 (Pensacola class), Mk24 (Northampton class), Mk27 (Portland class) and Mk31 (New Orleans class)

==== Deployment ====
- Battleships
  - Pennsylvania (1x)
  - Tennessee class (2 per vessel, 4 total)
  - Colorado class (1 on BB-45 and 46, 2 on BB-48, 4 total)
- 2 Alaska-class large cruisers (2 per vessel, 4 total)
- Heavy cruisers
  - Wichita (2x)
  - 14 Baltimore class (2 per vessel, 28 total)
  - 3 Oregon City class (2 per vessel, 6 total)
  - surviving Northampton class (2 per vessel, as upgrade)
  - Portland class (2 per vessel, as upgrade)
- Light cruisers
  - 9 Brooklyn class (2 per vessel, 18 total)
  - 27 Cleveland class (2 per vessel, 54 total)
  - 2 Fargo class (2 per vessel, 4 total)

=== Mark 37 GFCS ===
According to the US Navy Bureau of Ordnance,

While the defects were not prohibitive and the Mark 33 remained in production until fairly late in World War II, the Bureau started the development of an improved director in 1936, only 2 years after the first installation of a Mark 33. The objective of weight reduction was not met, since the resulting director system actually weighed about 8,000 pounds (3,600 kg) more than the equipment it was slated to replace, but the Gun Director Mark 37 that emerged from the program possessed virtues that more than compensated for its extra weight. Though the gun orders it provided were the same as those of the Mark 33, it supplied them with greater reliability and gave generally improved performance with 5-inch (13 cm) gun batteries, whether they were used for surface or antiaircraft use. Moreover, the stable element and computer, instead of being contained in the director housing were installed below deck where they were less vulnerable to attack and less of a jeopardy to a ship's stability. The design provided for the ultimate addition of radar, which later permitted blind firing with the director. In fact, the Mark 37 system was almost continually improved. By the end of 1945 the equipment had run through 92 modifications—almost twice the total number of directors of that type which were in the fleet on December 7, 1941. Procurement ultimately totalled 841 units, representing an investment of well over $148,000,000. Destroyers, cruisers, battleships, carriers, and many auxiliaries used the directors, with individual installations varying from one aboard destroyers to four on each battleship. The development of the Gun Directors Mark 33 and 37 provided the United States Fleet with good long range fire control against attacking planes. But while that had seemed the most pressing problem at the time the equipments were placed under development, it was but one part of the total problem of air defense. At close-in ranges the accuracy of the directors fell off sharply; even at intermediate ranges they left much to be desired. The weight and size of the equipments militated against rapid movement, making them difficult to shift from one target to another. Their efficiency was thus in inverse proportion to the proximity of danger.

The computer was completed as the Ford Mark 1 computer by 1935. Rate information for height changes enabled complete solution for aircraft targets moving over 400 miles per hour (640 km/h). Destroyers starting with the Sims class employed one of these computers, battleships up to four. The system's effectiveness against aircraft diminished as planes became faster, but toward the end of World War II upgrades were made to the Mark 37 System, and it was made compatible with the development of the VT (Variable Time) proximity fuze which exploded when it was near a target, rather than by timer or altitude, greatly increasing the probability that any one shell would destroy a target.

==== Mark 37 Director ====
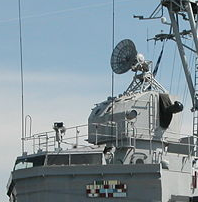
Mark 37 Director above bridge of destroyer USS Cassin Young, backfitted with postwar SPG-25 radar antenna

The function of the Mark 37 Director, which resembles a gun mount with "ears" rather than guns, was to track the present position of the target in bearing, elevation, and range. To do this, it had optical sights (the rectangular windows or hatches on the front), an optical rangefinder (the tubes or ears sticking out each side), and later models, fire control radar antennas. The rectangular antenna is for the Mark 12 FC radar, and the parabolic antenna on the left ("orange peel") is for the Mark 22 FC radar. They were part of an upgrade to improve tracking of aircraft.

The director was manned by a crew of 6: Director Officer, Assistant Control Officer, Pointer, Trainer, Range Finder Operator and Radar Operator.

The Director Officer also had a slew sight used to quickly point the director towards a new target. Up to four Mark 37 Gun Fire Control Systems were installed on battleships. On a battleship, the director was protected by 1 1/2 inches (38 mm) of armor, and weighs 21 tons. The Mark 37 director aboard USS Joseph P. Kennedy, Jr. is protected with one-half inch (13 mm) of armor plate and weighs 16 tons.

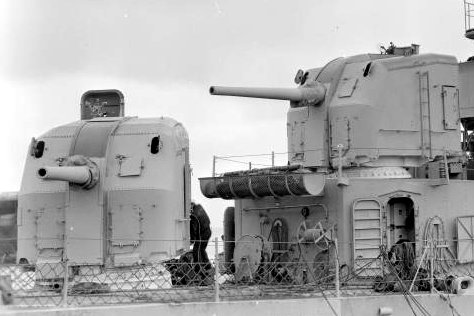
5-inch (127 mm) gun on the Fletcher-class destroyer USS David W. Taylor

Stabilizing signals from the Stable Element kept the optical sight telescopes, rangefinder, and radar antenna free from the effects of deck tilt. The signal that kept the rangefinder's axis horizontal was called "crosslevel"; elevation stabilization was called simply "level". Although the stable element was below decks in Plot, next to the Mark 1/1A computer, its internal gimbals followed director motion in bearing and elevation so that it provided level and crosslevel data directly. To do so, accurately, when the fire control system was initially installed, a surveyor, working in several stages, transferred the position of the gun director into Plot so the stable element's own internal mechanism was properly aligned to the director.

Although the rangefinder had significant mass and inertia, the crosslevel servo normally was only lightly loaded, because the rangefinder's own inertia kept it essentially horizontal; the servo's task was usually simply to ensure that the rangefinder and sight telescopes remained horizontal.

Mark 37 director train (bearing) and elevation drives were by D.C. motors fed from Amplidyne rotary power-amplifying generators. Although the train Amplidyne was rated at several kilowatts maximum output, its input signal came from a pair of 6L6 audio beam tetrode vacuum tubes (valves, in the U.K.).

==== Plotting room ====
In battleships, the Secondary Battery Plotting Rooms were down below the waterline and inside the armor belt. They contained four complete sets of the fire control equipment needed to aim and shoot at four targets. Each set included a Mark 1A computer, a Mark 6 Stable Element, FC radar controls and displays, parallax correctors, a switchboard, and people to operate it all.

(In the early 20th century, successive range and/or bearing readings were probably plotted either by hand or by the fire control devices (or both). Humans were very good data filters, able to plot a useful trend line given somewhat-inconsistent readings. As well, the Mark 8 Rangekeeper included a plotter. The distinctive name for the fire-control equipment room took root, and persisted even when there were no plotters.)

==== Ford Mark 1A Fire Control Computer ====
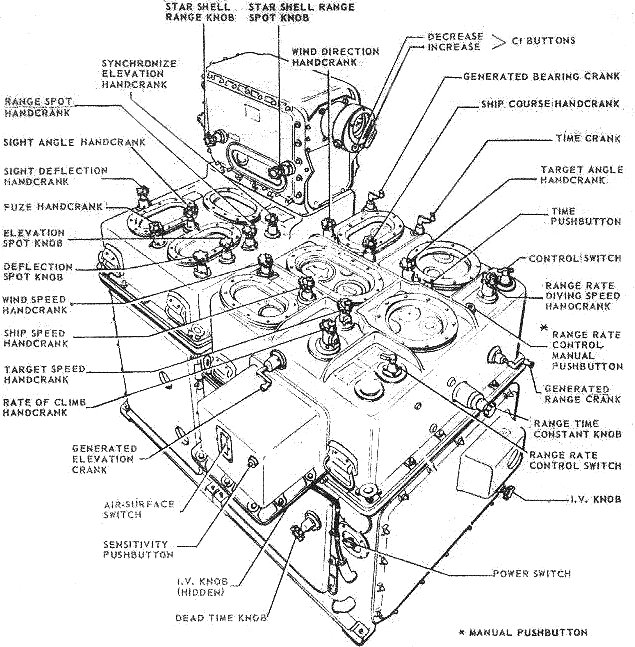
Mark 1A Computer

The Mark 1A Fire Control Computer was an electro-mechanical analog ballistic computer. Originally designated the Mark 1, design modifications were extensive enough to change it to "Mark 1A". The Mark 1A appeared post World War II and may have incorporated technology developed for the Bell Labs Mark 8, Fire Control Computer. Sailors would stand around a box measuring 62 by 38 by 45 inches (1.57 by 0.97 by 1.14 m). Even though built with extensive use of an aluminum alloy framework (including thick internal mechanism support plates) and computing mechanisms mostly made of aluminum alloy, it weighed as much as a car, about 3,125 pounds (1,417 kg), with the Star Shell Computer Mark 1 adding another 215 pounds (98 kg). It used 115 volts AC, 60 Hz, single phase, and typically a few amperes or even less. Under worst-case fault conditions, its synchros apparently could draw as much as 140 amperes, or 15,000 watts (about the same as 3 houses while using ovens). Almost all of the computer's inputs and outputs were by synchro torque transmitters and receivers.

Its function was to automatically aim the guns so that a fired projectile would collide with the target. This is the same function as the main battery's Mark 8 Rangekeeper used in the Mark 38 GFCS except that some of the targets the Mark 1A had to deal with also moved in elevation—and much faster. For a surface target, the Secondary Battery's Fire Control problem is the same as the Main Battery's with the same type inputs and outputs. The major difference between the two computers is their ballistics calculations. The amount of gun elevation needed to project a 5-inch (130 mm) shell 9 nautical miles (17 km) is very different from the elevation needed to project a 16-inch (41 cm) shell the same distance.

In operation, this computer received target range, bearing, and elevation from the gun director. As long as the director was on target, clutches in the computer were closed, and movement of the gun director (along with changes in range) made the computer converge its internal values of target motion to values matching those of the target. While converging, the computer fed aided-tracking ("generated") range, bearing, and elevation to the gun director. If the target remained on a straight-line course at a constant speed (and in the case of aircraft, constant rate of change of altitude ("rate of climb"), the predictions became accurate and, with further computation, gave correct values for the gun lead angles and fuze setting.

The target's movement was a vector, and if that didn't change, the generated range, bearing, and elevation were accurate for up to 30 seconds. Once the target's motion vector became stable, the computer operators told the gun director officer ("Solution Plot!"), who usually gave the command to commence firing. Unfortunately, this process of inferring the target motion vector required a few seconds, typically, which might take too long.

The process of determining the target's motion vector was done primarily with an accurate constant-speed motor, disk-ball-roller integrators, nonlinear cams, mechanical resolvers, and differentials. Four special coordinate converters, each with a mechanism in part like that of a traditional computer mouse, converted the received corrections into target motion vector values. The Mark 1 computer attempted to do the coordinate conversion (in part) with a rectangular-to polar converter, but that didn't work as well as desired (sometimes trying to make target speed negative!). Part of the design changes that defined the Mark 1A were a re-thinking of how to best use these special coordinate converters; the coordinate converter ("vector solver") was eliminated.

The Stable Element, which in contemporary terminology would be called a vertical gyro, stabilized the sights in the director, and provided data to compute stabilizing corrections to the gun orders. Gun lead angles meant that gun-stabilizing commands differed from those needed to keep the director's sights stable. Ideal computation of gun stabilizing angles required an impractical number of terms in the mathematical expression, so the computation was approximate.

To compute lead angles and time fuze setting, the target motion vector's components as well as its range and altitude, wind direction and speed, and own ship's motion combined to predict the target's location when the shell reached it. This computation was done primarily with mechanical resolvers ("component solvers"), multipliers, and differentials, but also with one of four three-dimensional cams.

Based on the predictions, the other three of the three-dimensional cams provided data on ballistics of the gun and ammunition that the computer was designed for; it could not be used for a different size or type of gun except by rebuilding that could take weeks.

Servos in the computer boosted torque accurately to minimize loading on the outputs of computing mechanisms, thereby reducing errors, and also positioned the large synchros that transmitted gun orders (bearing and elevation, sight lead angles, and time fuze setting). These were electromechanical "bang-bang", yet had excellent performance.

The anti-aircraft fire control problem was more complicated because it had the additional requirement of tracking the target in elevation and making target predictions in three dimensions. The outputs of the Mark 1A were the same (gun bearing and elevation), except fuze time was added. The fuze time was needed because the ideal of directly hitting the fast moving aircraft with the projectile was impractical. With fuze time set into the shell, it was hoped that it would explode near enough to the target to destroy it with the shock wave and shrapnel. Towards the end of World War II, the invention of the VT proximity fuze eliminated the need to use the fuze time calculation and its possible error. This greatly increased the odds of destroying an air target. Digital fire control computers were not introduced into service until the mid-1970s.

Central aiming from a gun director has a minor complication in that the guns are often far enough away from the director to require parallax correction so they aim correctly. In the Mark 37 GFCS, the Mark 1/1A sent parallax data to all gun mounts; each mount had its own scale factor (and "polarity") set inside the train (bearing) power drive (servo) receiver-regulator (controller).

Twice in its history, internal scale factors were changed, presumably by changing gear ratios. Target speed had a hard upper limit, set by a mechanical stop. It was originally 300 knots (350 mph; 560 km/h), and subsequently doubled in each rebuild.

These computers were built by Ford Instrument Company, Long Island City, Queens, New York. The company was named after Hannibal C. Ford, a genius designer, and principal in the company. Special machine tools machined face cam grooves and accurately duplicated 3-D ballistic cams.

Generally speaking, these computers were very well designed and built, very rugged, and almost trouble-free, frequent tests included entering values via the handcranks and reading results on the dials, with the time motor stopped. These were static tests. Dynamic tests were done similarly, but used gentle manual acceleration of the "time line" (integrators) to prevent possible slippage errors when the time motor was switched on; the time motor was switched off before the run was complete, and the computer was allowed to coast down. Easy manual cranking of the time line brought the dynamic test to its desired end point, when dials were read.

As was typical of such computers, flipping a lever on the handcrank's support casting enabled automatic reception of data and disengaged the handcrank gear. Flipped the other way, the gear engaged, and power was cut to the receiver's servo motor.

The mechanisms (including servos) in this computer are described superbly, with many excellent illustrations, in the Navy publication OP 1140.

There are photographs of the computer's interior in the National Archives; some are on Web pages, and some of those have been rotated a quarter turn.

==== Stable Element ====
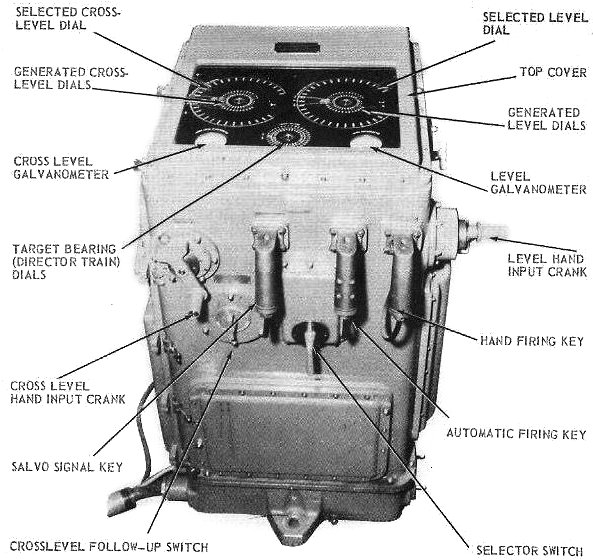
Mark 6 Stable Element

The function of the Mark 6 Stable Element (pictured) in this fire control system is the same as the function of the Mark 41 Stable Vertical in the main battery system. It is a vertical seeking gyroscope ("vertical gyro", in today's terms) that supplies the system with a stable up direction on a rolling and pitching ship. In surface mode, it replaces the director's elevation signal. It also has the surface mode firing keys.

It is based on a gyroscope that erects so its spin axis is vertical. The housing for the gyro rotor rotates at a low speed, on the order of 18 rpm. On opposite sides of the housing are two small tanks, partially filled with mercury, and connected by a capillary tube. Mercury flows to the lower tank, but slowly (several seconds) because of the tube's restriction. If the gyro's spin axis is not vertical, the added weight in the lower tank would pull the housing over if it were not for the gyro and the housing's rotation. That rotational speed and rate of mercury flow combine to put the heavier tank in the best position to make the gyro precess toward the vertical.

When the ship changes course rapidly at speed, the acceleration due to the turn can be enough to confuse the gyro and make it deviate from true vertical. In such cases, the ship's gyrocompass sends a disabling signal that closes a solenoid valve to block mercury flow between the tanks. The gyro's drift is low enough not to matter for short periods of time; when the ship resumes more typical cruising, the erecting system corrects for any error.

The Earth's rotation is fast enough to need correcting. A small adjustable weight on a threaded rod, and a latitude scale makes the gyro precess at the Earth's equivalent angular rate at the given latitude. The weight, its scale, and frame are mounted on the shaft of a synchro torque receiver fed with ship's course data from the gyro compass, and compensated by a differential synchro driven by the housing-rotator motor. The little compensator in operation is geographically oriented, so the support rod for the weight points east and west.

At the top of the gyro assembly, above the compensator, right on center, is an exciter coil fed with low-voltage AC. Above that is a shallow black-painted wooden bowl, inverted. Inlaid in its surface, in grooves, are two coils essentially like two figure 8s, but shaped more like a letter D and its mirror image, forming a circle with a diametral crossover. One coil is displaced by 90 degrees. If the bowl (called an "umbrella") is not centered above the exciter coil, either or both coils have an output that represents the offset. This voltage is phase-detected and amplified to drive two DC servo motors to position the umbrella in line with the coil.

The umbrella support gimbals rotate in bearing with the gun director, and the servo motors generate level and crosslevel stabilizing signals. The Mark 1A's director bearing receiver servo drives the pickoff gimbal frame in the stable element through a shaft between the two devices, and the Stable Element's level and crosslevel servos feed those signals back to the computer via two more shafts.

(The sonar fire-control computer aboard some destroyers of the late 1950s required roll and pitch signals for stabilizing, so a coordinate converter containing synchros, resolvers, and servos calculated the latter from gun director bearing, level, and crosslevel.)

==== Fire Control Radar ====
The fire-control radar used on the Mark 37 GFCS has evolved. In the 1930s, the Mark 33 Director did not have a radar antenna. The Tizard Mission to the United States provided the USN with crucial data on UK and Royal Navy radar technology and fire-control radar systems. In September 1941, the first rectangular Mark 4 Fire-control radar antenna was mounted on a Mark 37 Director, and became a common feature on USN Directors by mid 1942. Soon aircraft flew faster, and in c1944 to increase speed and accuracy the Mark 4 was replaced by a combination of the Mark 12 (rectangular antenna) and Mark 22 (parabolic antenna) "orange peel" radars. (pictured) in the late 1950s, Mark 37 directors had Western Electric Mark 25 X-band conical-scan radars with round, perforated dishes. Finally, the circular SPG 25 antenna was mounted on top.

==== Deployment ====
- Destroyers (1 per vessel, 459 total)
  - 2 rebuilt Mahan class: Downes, Cassin
  - several modernized Porter class: McDougal, Phelps, Selfridge, Winslow
  - several modernized Somers class: Davis, Jouett
  - 12 Sims class (launched c. 1939)
  - 30 Benson class (1939–1942)
  - 66 Gleaves class (1940–1942)
  - 175 Fletcher class (1942–1944)
  - 58 Allen M. Sumner-class (c. 1944)
  - 12 Robert H. Smith-class (c. 1944)
  - 98 Gearing-class (c. 1945)
    - possibly on USS Castle and USS Seaman which were launched incomplete and never commissioned
- Light cruisers (92 total)
  - 8 Atlanta class (launched c. 1941-1944) (2 per vessel, 16 total)
  - 3 Juneau class (c. 1945) (2 per vessel, 6 total)
  - 27 Cleveland class (launched c. 1942–1945) (2 per vessel, 54 total)
    - one Mk 37 removed on Oklahoma City during CLG conversion
  - 2 Fargo class (c. 1945) (2 per vessel, 4 total)
  - 2 Worcester class (c. 1947) (4 per vessel, 8 total)
  - 2 Brooklyn class (Savannah, Honolulu refitted as upgrade in 1944)
- Heavy cruisers (46 total)
  - 14 Baltimore class (c. 1942–1945) (2 per vessel, 28 total)
  - 3 Oregon City class (c. 1945) (2 per vessel, 6 total)
  - 3 Des Moines-class (c. 1947) (4 per vessel, 12 total)
- 2 Alaska-class large cruisers (c. 1943) (2 per vessel, 4 total)
- Aircraft carriers (64 total)
  - Saratoga: 2 x Mk 37 refitted by May 1942
  - Enterprise: 2 x Mk 37 refitted by October 1943
  - Hornet: 2 x Mk 37 fitted as built
  - 24 Essex class (2 per vessel, 48 total)
  - 3 Midway class (4 on CV-41 and 42, 2 on CV-43, 10 total)
- Battleships (60 total)
  - Nevada 4 x Mk 37 refitted by December 1942
  - Pennsylvania 2 x Mk 37 refitted by February 1943
  - 2 Tennessee class 4 x Mk 37 installed during reconstruction
  - Maryland 2 x Mk 37 refitted by August 1945
  - West Virginia 4 x Mk 37 installed during reconstruction
  - 2 North Carolina class (c. 1940) (4 per vessel)
  - 4 South Dakota class (launched c. 1941–1942) (4 per vessel)
  - 4 Iowa class (launched c. 1942–1943) (4 per vessel)

=== Mark 38 GFCS ===
The Mark 38 Gun Fire Control System (GFCS) controlled the large main battery guns of the fast battleships. The radar systems used by the Mark 38 GFCS were far more advanced than the primitive radar sets used by the Japanese in World War II. The major components were the director, plotting room, and interconnecting data transmission equipment. The two systems, forward and aft, were complete and independent. Their plotting rooms were isolated to protect against battle damage propagating from one to the other.

==== Director ====
Mark 38 Director

The forward Mark 38 Director (pictured) was situated on top of the fire control tower. The director was equipped with optical sights, optical Mark 48 Rangefinder (the long thin boxes sticking out each side), and a Mark 13 Fire Control Radar antenna (the rectangular shape sitting on top). The purpose of the director was to track the target's present bearing and range. This could be done optically with the men inside using the sights and Rangefinder, or electronically with the radar. (The fire control radar was the preferred method.) The present position of the target was called the Line-Of-Sight (LOS), and it was continuously sent down to the plotting room by synchro motors. When not using the radar's display to determine Spots, the director was the optical spotting station.

==== Plotting room ====
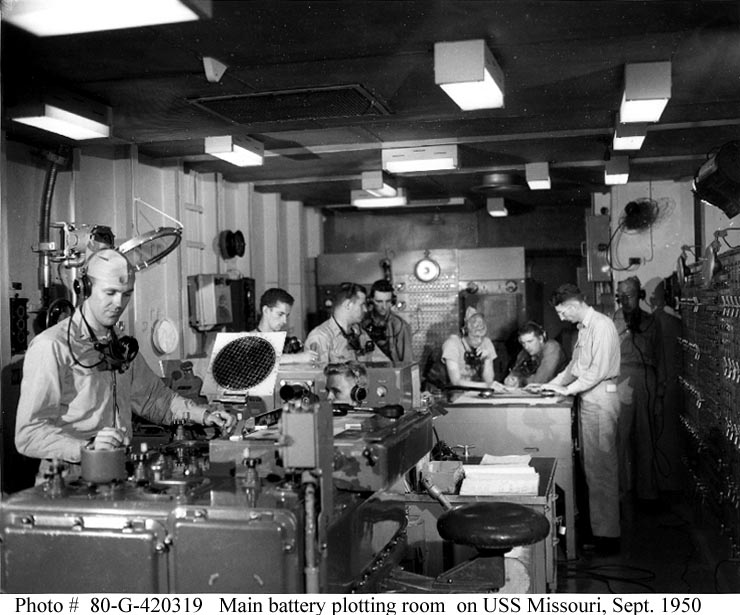
USS Missouri's Main Plot, c. 1950

The Forward Main Battery Plotting Room was located below the waterline and inside the armored belt. It housed the forward system's Mark 8 Rangekeeper, Mark 41 Stable Vertical, Mark 13 FC Radar controls and displays, Parallax Correctors, Fire Control Switchboard, battle telephone switchboard, battery status indicators, assistant Gunnery Officers, and Fire Controlmen (FCs) (between 1954 and 1982, FCs were designated as Fire Control Technicians (FTs)).

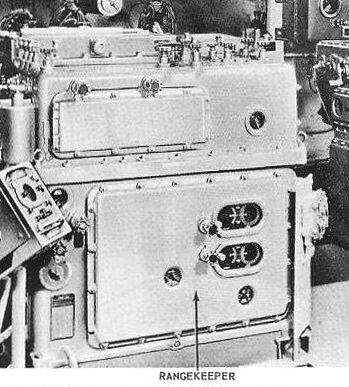
Mark 8 Rangekeeper

The Mark 8 Rangekeeper was an electromechanical analog computer whose function was to continuously calculate the gun's bearing and elevation, Line-Of-Fire (LOF), to hit a future position of the target. It did this by automatically receiving information from the director (LOS), the FC Radar (range), the ship's gyrocompass (true ship's course), the ships Pitometer log (ship's speed), the Stable Vertical (ship's deck tilt, sensed as level and crosslevel), and the ship's anemometer (relative wind speed and direction). Also, before the surface action started, the FT's made manual inputs for the average initial velocity of the projectiles fired out of the battery's gun barrels, and air density. With all this information, the rangekeeper calculated the relative motion between its ship and the target. It then could calculate an offset angle and change of range between the target's present position (LOS) and future position at the end of the projectile's time of flight. To this bearing and range offset, it added corrections for gravity, wind, Magnus Effect of the spinning projectile, stabilizing signals originating in the Stable Vertical, Earth's curvature, and Coriolis effect. The result was the turret's bearing and elevation orders (LOF). During the surface action, range and deflection Spots and target altitude (not zero during Gun Fire Support) were manually entered.

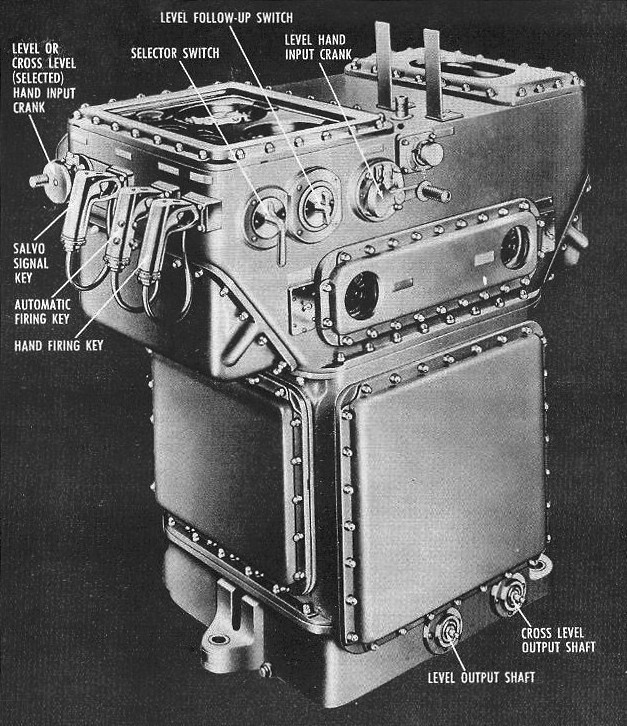
Mark 41 Stable Vertical

The Mark 41 Stable Vertical was a vertical seeking gyroscope, and its function was to tell the rest of the system which-way-is-up on a rolling and pitching ship. It also held the battery's firing keys.

The Mark 13 FC Radar supplied present target range, and it showed the fall of shot around the target so the Gunnery Officer could correct the system's aim with range and deflection spots put into the rangekeeper. It could also automatically track the target by controlling the director's bearing power drive. Because of radar, Fire Control systems are able to track and fire at targets at a greater range and with increased accuracy during the day, night, or inclement weather. This was demonstrated in November 1942 when the battleship USS Washington engaged the Imperial Japanese Navy battlecruiser Kirishima at a range of 18,500 yards (16,900 m) at night. The engagement left Kirishima in flames, and she was ultimately scuttled by her crew. This gave the United States Navy a major advantage in World War II, as the Japanese did not develop radar or automated fire control to the level of the US Navy and were at a significant disadvantage.

The parallax correctors are needed because the turrets are located hundreds of feet from the director. There is one for each turret, and each has the turret and director distance manually set in. They automatically received relative target bearing (bearing from own ship's bow), and target range. They corrected the bearing order for each turret so that all rounds fired in a salvo converged on the same point.

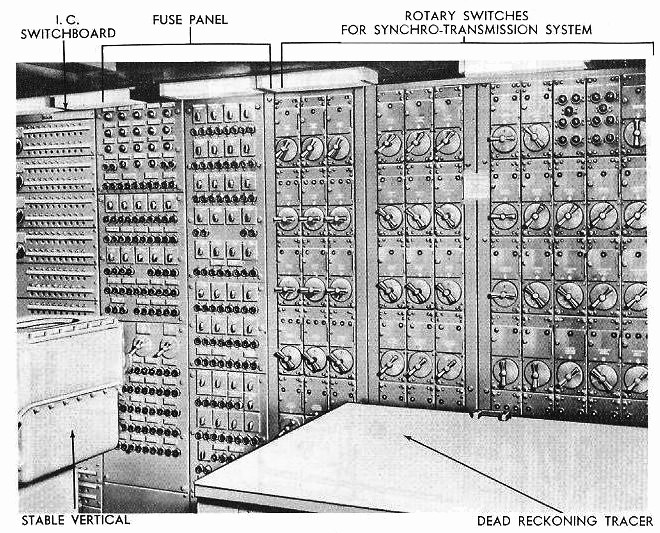
Fire Control Switchboard

The fire control switchboard configured the battery. With it, the Gunnery Officer could mix and match the three turrets to the two GFCSs. He could have the turrets all controlled by the forward system, all controlled by the aft system, or split the battery to shoot at two targets.

The assistant Gunnery Officers and Fire Control Technicians operated the equipment, talked to the turrets and ship's command by sound-powered telephone, and watched the Rangekeeper's dials and system status indicators for problems. If a problem arose, they could correct the problem, or reconfigure the system to mitigate its effect.

=== Mark 51 Fire Control System ===
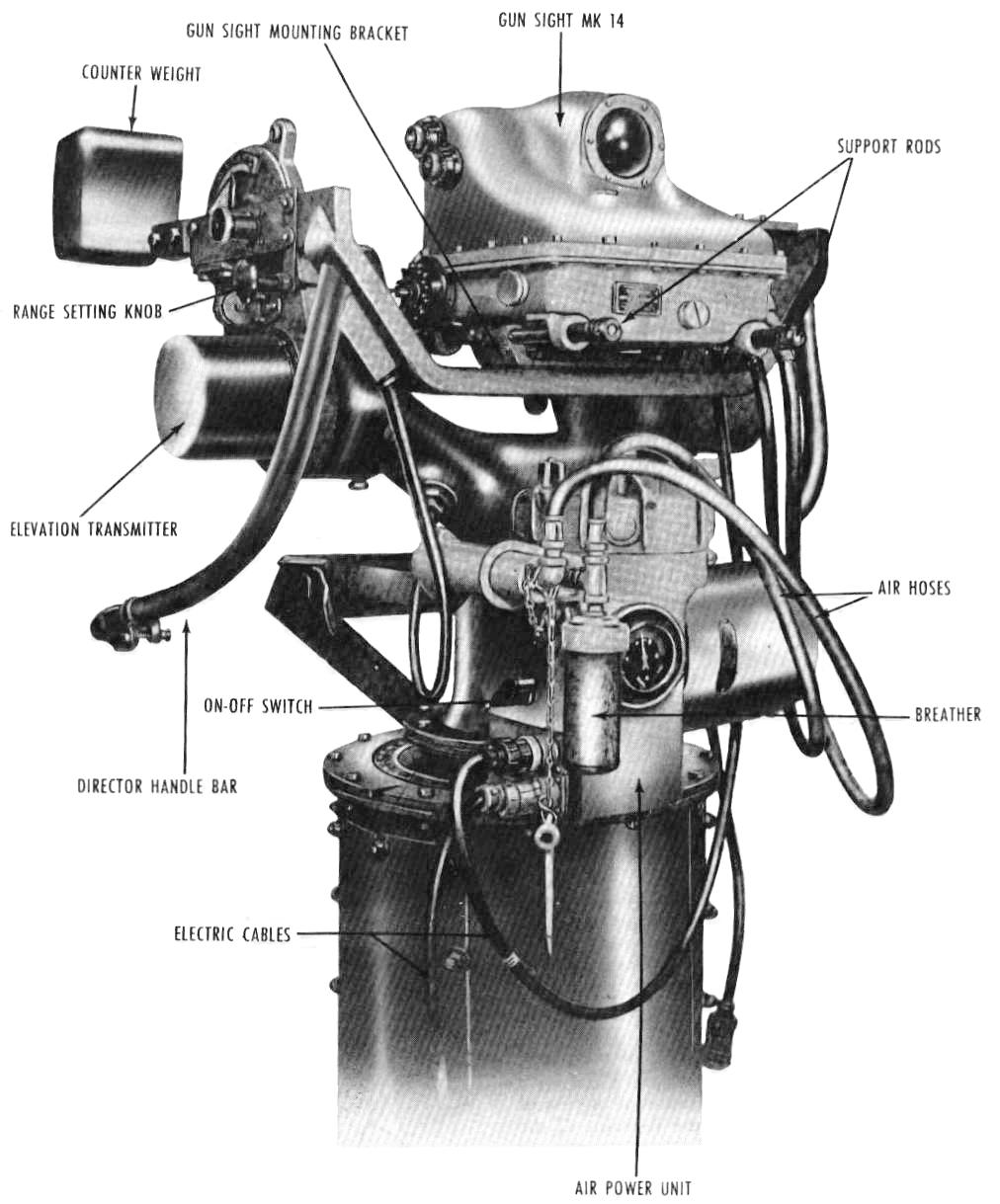
Mark 51 Director with Mark 14 (40 mm) Gun Sight

The Bofors 40 mm anti-aircraft guns were arguably the best light anti-aircraft weapon of World War II, employed on almost every major warship in the U.S. and UK fleet during World War II from about 1943 to 1945. They were most effective on ships as large as destroyer escorts or larger when coupled with electric-hydraulic drives for greater speed and the Mark 51 Director (pictured) for improved accuracy, the Bofors 40 mm gun became a fearsome adversary, accounting for roughly half of all Japanese aircraft shot down between 1 October 1944 and 1 February 1945.

=== Mark 56 GFCS ===
This GFCS was an intermediate-range, anti-aircraft gun fire-control system. It was designed for use against high-speed subsonic aircraft. It could also be used against surface targets. It was a dual ballistic system. This means that it was capable of simultaneously producing gun orders for two different gun types (e.g.: 5"/38cal and 3"/50cal) against the same target. Its Mark 35 Radar was capable of automatic tracking in bearing, elevation, and range that was as accurate as any optical tracking. The whole system could be controlled from the below decks Plotting Room with or without the director being manned. This allowed for rapid target acquisition when a target was first detected and designated by the ship's air-search radar, and not yet visible from on deck. Its target solution time was less than 2 seconds after Mark 35 radar "Lock on". It was designed toward the end of World War II, apparently in response to Japanese kamikaze aircraft attacks. It was conceived by Ivan Getting, mentioned near the end of his Oral history, and its linkage computer was designed by Antonín Svoboda. Its gun director was not shaped like a box, and it had no optical rangefinder. The system was manned by crew of four. On the left side of the director, was the Cockpit where the Control Officer stood behind the sitting Director Operator (Also called Director Pointer). Below decks in Plot, was the Mark 4 Radar Console where the Radar Operator and Radar Tracker sat. The director's movement in bearing was unlimited because it had slip-rings in its pedestal. (The Mark 37 gun director had a cable connection to the hull, and occasionally had to be "unwound".) Fig. 26E8 on this Web page shows the director in considerable detail. The explanatory drawings of the system show how it works, but are wildly different in physical appearance from the actual internal mechanisms, perhaps intentionally so. However, it omits any significant description of the mechanism of the linkage computer. That chapter is an excellent detailed reference that explains much of the system's design, which is quite ingenious and forward-thinking in several respects.

In the 1968 upgrade to USS New Jersey for service off Vietnam, three Mark 56 Gun Fire Control Systems were installed. Two on either side just forward of the aft stack, and one between the aft mast and the aft Mark 38 Director tower. This increased New Jersey's anti-aircraft capability, because the Mark 56 system could track and shoot at faster planes.

=== Mark 63 GFCS ===
The Mark 63 was introduced in 1953 for the twin QF 4-inch naval gun Mk XVI and Mk.33 twin 3"/50 cal guns. The GFCS consists of an AN/SPG-34 radar tracker and a Mark 29 gun sight.

=== Mark 68 GFCS ===
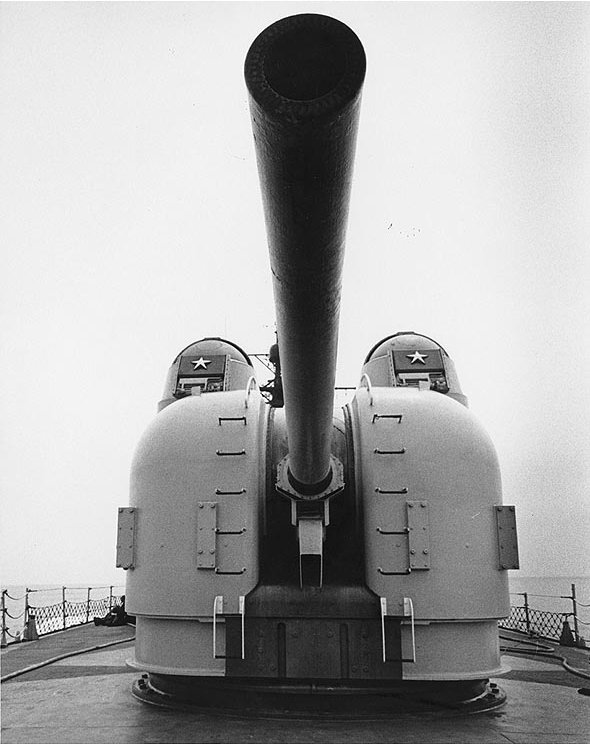
5 inch Mark 42 gun turret

Introduced in the early 1950s, the Mark 68 was an upgrade from the Mark 37 effective against air and surface targets. It combined a manned topside director, a conical scan acquisition and tracking radar, an analog computer to compute ballistics solutions, and a gyro stabilization unit. The gun director was mounted in a large yoke, and the whole director was stabilized in crosslevel (the yoke's pivot axis). That axis was in a vertical plane that included the line of sight.

At least in 1958, the computer was the Mark 47, an hybrid electronic/electromechanical system. Somewhat akin to the Mark 1A, it had electrical high-precision resolvers instead of the mechanical one of earlier machines, and multiplied with precision linear potentiometers. However, it still had disc/roller integrators as well as shafting to interconnect the mechanical elements. Whereas access to much of the Mark 1A required time-consuming and careful disassembly (think days in some instances, and possibly a week to gain access to deeply buried mechanisms), the Mark 47 was built on thick support plates mounted behind the front panels on slides that permitted its six major sections to be pulled out of its housing for easy access to any of its parts. (The sections, when pulled out, moved fore and aft; they were heavy, not counterbalanced. Typically, a ship rolls through a much larger angle than it pitches.) The Mark 47 probably had 3-D cams for ballistics, but information on it appears very difficult to obtain.

Mechanical connections between major sections were via shafts in the extreme rear, with couplings permitting disconnection without any attention, and probably relief springs to aid re-engagement. One might think that rotating an output shaft by hand in a pulled-out section would misalign the computer, but the type of data transmission of all such shafts did not represent magnitude; only the incremental rotation of such shafts conveyed data, and it was summed by differentials at the receiving end. One such kind of quantity is the output from the roller of a mechanical integrator; the position of the roller at any given time is immaterial; it is only the incrementing and decrementing that counts.

Whereas the Mark 1/1A computations for the stabilizing component of gun orders had to be approximations, they were theoretically exact in the Mark 47 computer, computed by an electrical resolver chain.

The design of the computer was based on a re-thinking of the fire control problem; it was regarded quite differently.

Production of this system lasted for over 25 years. A digital upgrade was available from 1975 to 1985, and it was in service into the 2000s. The digital upgrade was evolved for use in the Arleigh Burke-class destroyers.

AN/SPG-53
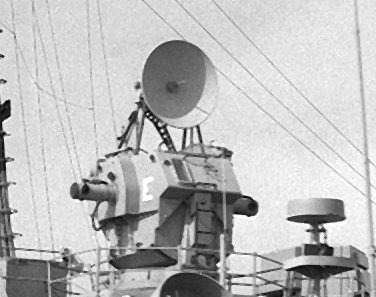
- Mark 68 GFCS director with AN/SPG-53 radar antenna on top.
- Country of origin: United States
- Type: Gun fire-control
- Precision: Fire control quality, three dimensional data

The AN/SPG-53 was a United States Navy gun fire-control radar used in conjunction with the Mark 68 gun fire-control system. It was used with the 5-inch/54 caliber Mark 42 gun system aboard Belknap-class cruisers, Forrest Sherman-class destroyers, Farragut-class destroyers, Charles F. Adams-class destroyers, Knox-class frigates as well as others.

== US Navy computerized fire control systems ==
=== Mark 86 GFCS ===
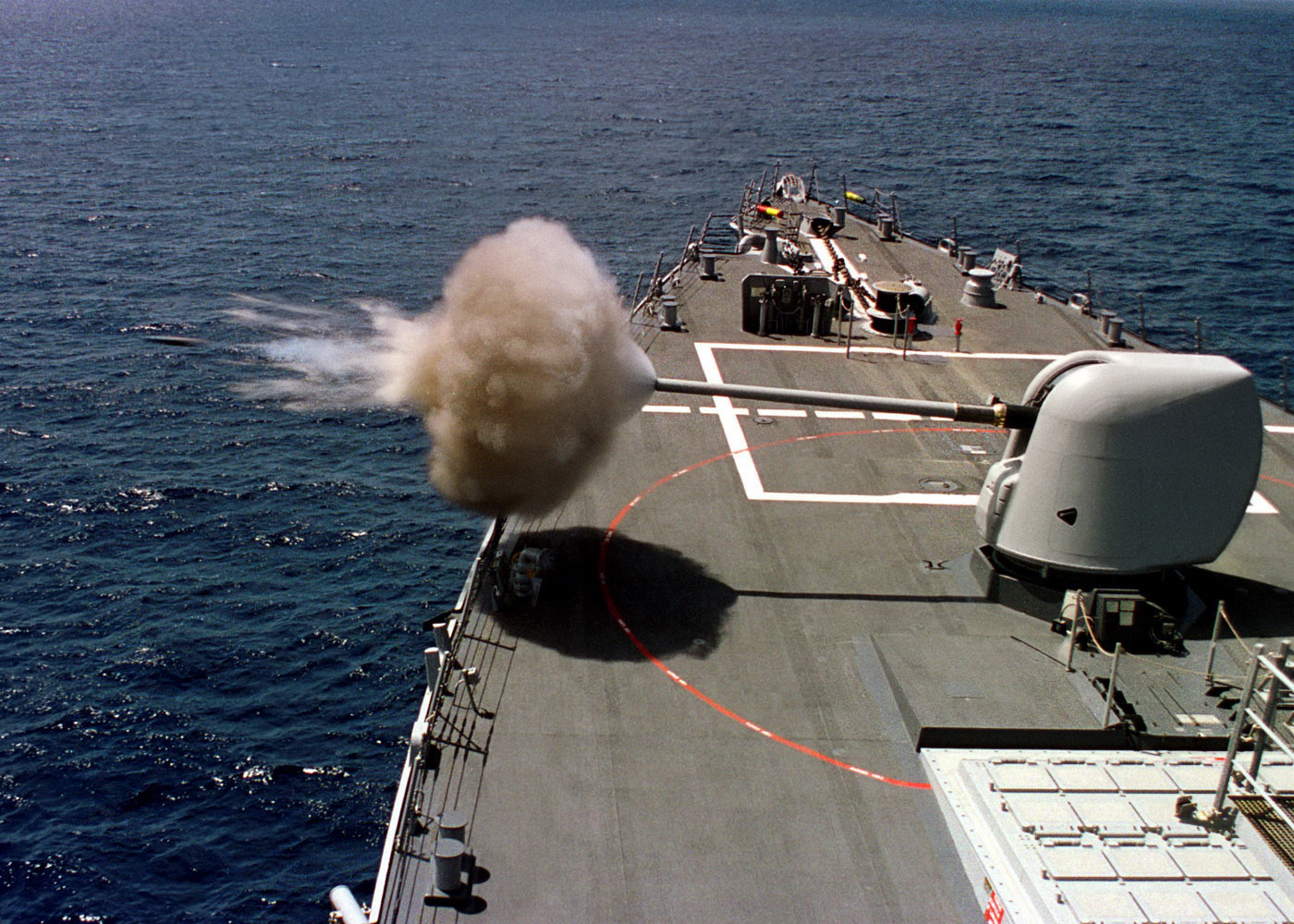
Mark 45 lightweight gun turret

The US Navy desired a digital computerized gun fire-control system in 1961 for more accurate shore bombardment. Lockheed Electronics produced a prototype with AN/SPQ-9 radar fire control in 1965. An air defense requirement delayed production with the AN/SPG-60 until 1971. The Mark 86 did not enter service until when the nuclear-powered missile cruiser was commissioned in February 1974, and subsequently installed on US cruisers and amphibious assault ships. The last US ship to receive the system, USS Port Royal was commissioned in July 1994.

The Mark 86 on Aegis-class ships controls the ship's 5"/54 caliber Mark 45 gun mounts, and can engage up to two targets at a time. It also uses a Remote Optical Sighting system which uses a TV camera with a telephoto zoom lens mounted on the mast and each of the illuminating radars.

=== Mark 34 Gun Weapon System (GWS) ===
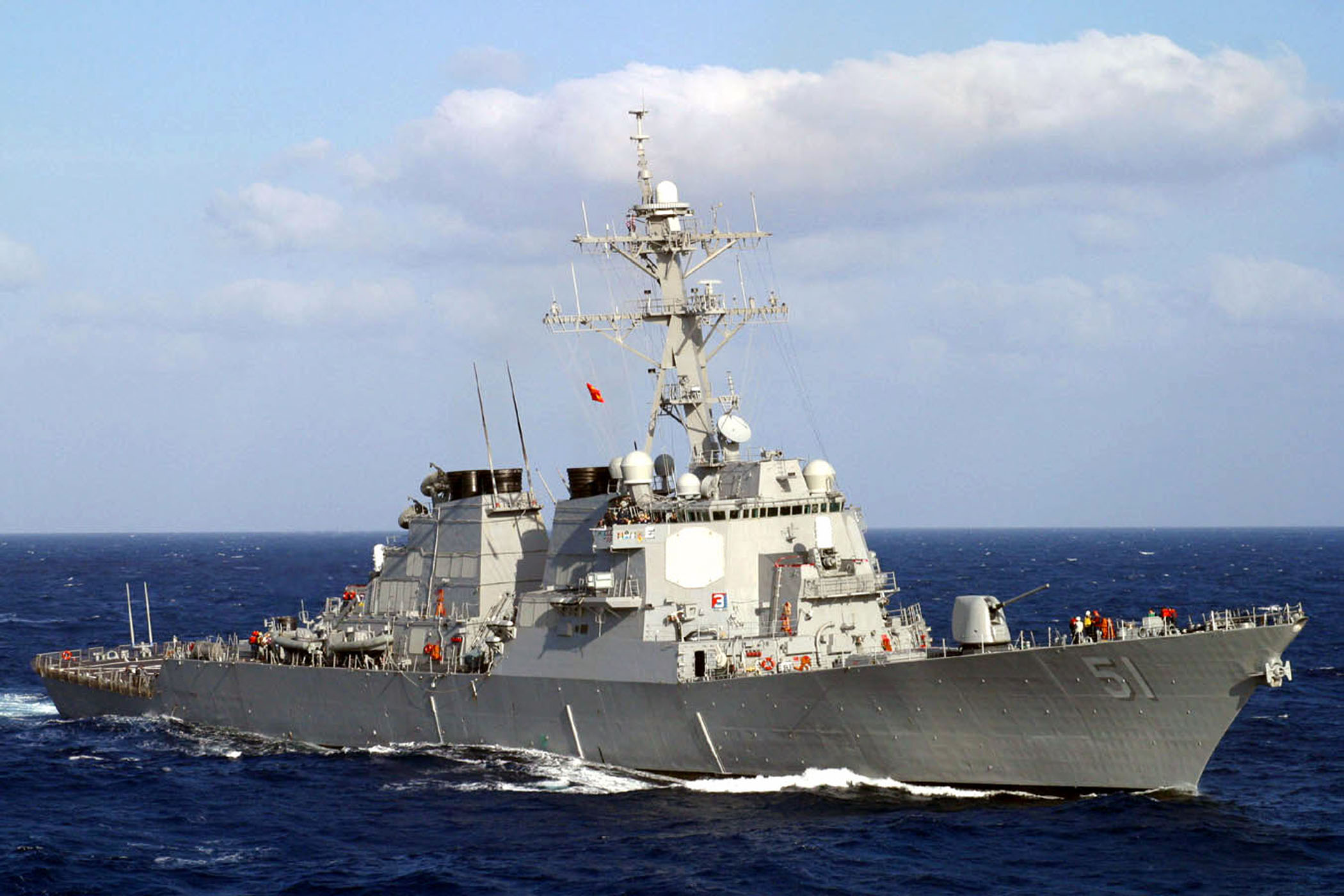
USS Arleigh Burke

The Mark 34 Gun Weapon System comes in various versions. It is an integral part of the Aegis combat weapon system on Arleigh Burke-class guided missile destroyers and modified Ticonderoga-class cruisers. It combines the Mark 45 5"/54 or 5"/62 Caliber Gun Mount, Mark 46 Optical Sight System or Mark 20 Electro-Optical Sight System and the Mark 160 Mod 4–11 Gunfire Control System / Gun Computer System. Other versions of the Mark 34 GWS are used by foreign navies as well as the US Coast Guard, with each configuration having its own unique camera and/or gun system. It can be used against surface ship and close hostile aircraft, and as in Naval Gunfire Support (NGFS) against shore targets.

=== Mark 92 Fire Control System (FCS) ===
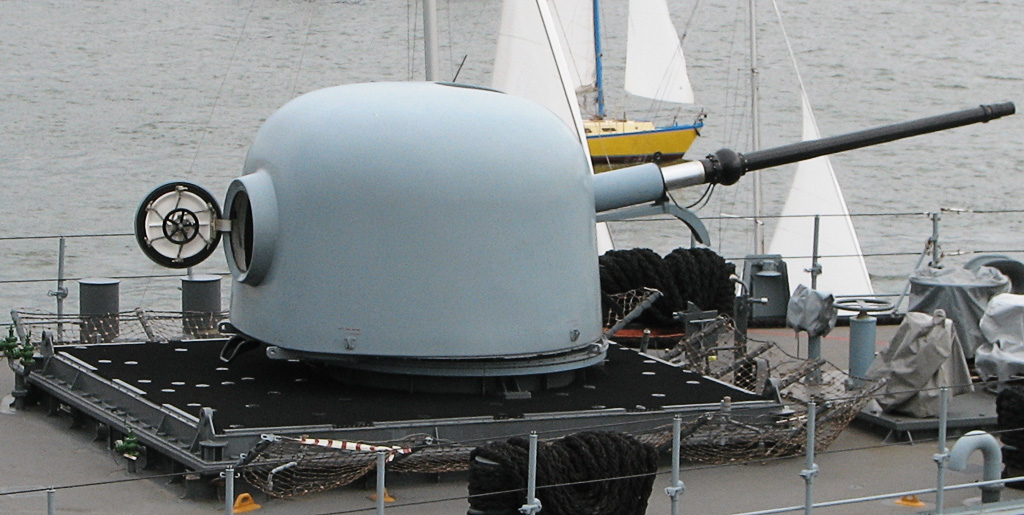
Mark 75 gun

The Mark 92 fire control system, an Americanized version of the WM-25 system designed in The Netherlands, was approved for service use in 1975. It is deployed on board the relatively small and austere Oliver Hazard Perry-class frigate to control the Mark 75 Naval Gun and the Mark 13 Guided Missile Launching System (missiles have since been removed since retirement of its version of the Standard missile). The Mod 1 system used in PHMs (retired) and the US Coast Guard's WMEC and WHEC ships can track one air or surface target using the monopulse tracker and two surface or shore targets. Oliver Hazard Perry-class frigates with the Mod 2 system can track an additional air or surface target using the Separate Track Illuminating Radar (STIR).

=== Mark 160 Gun Computing System ===
Used in the Mark 34 Gun Weapon System, the Mark 160 Gun Computing System (GCS) contains a gun console computer (GCC), a computer display console (CDC), a magnetic tape recorder-reproducer, a watertight cabinet housing the signal data converter and gun mount microprocessor, a gun mount control panel (GMCP), and a velocimeter.

== See also ==
- Close-in weapon system
- Director (military)
- Fire-control system Ground, sea and air based systems
- Mathematical discussion of rangekeeping
- Rangekeeper shipboard analog fire-control computer

== Bibliography ==
- Campbell, John (1985). Naval Weapons of World War Two. Naval Institute Press. ISBN 0-87021-459-4.
- Fairfield, A.P. (1921). Naval Ordnance. The Lord Baltimore Press.
- Fischer, Brad D. & Jurens, W. J. (2006). "Fast Battleship Gunnery During World War II: A Gunnery Revolution, Part II". Warship International. XLIII (1): 55–97. ISSN 0043-0374.
- Frieden, David R. (1985). Principles of Naval Weapons Systems. Naval Institute Press. ISBN 0-87021-537-X.
- Friedman, Norman (2008). Naval Firepower: Battleship Guns and Gunnery in the Dreadnought Era. Seaforth. ISBN 978-1-84415-701-3.
- Jurens, W. J. (1991). "The Evolution of Battleship Gunnery in the U. S. Navy, 1920–1945". Warship International. XXVIII (3): 240–271. ISSN 0043-0374.
- Pollen, Antony (1980). The Great Gunnery Scandal – The Mystery of Jutland. Collins. ISBN 0-00-216298-9.
- Schleihauf, William (2001). "The Dumaresq and the Dreyer". Warship International. XXXVIII (1). International Naval Research Organization: 6–29. ISSN 0043-0374.
- Schleihauf, William (2001). "The Dumaresq and the Dreyer, Part II". Warship International. XXXVIII (2). International Naval Research Organization: 164–201. ISSN 0043-0374.
- Schleihauf, William (2001). "The Dumaresq and the Dreyer, Part III". Warship International. XXXVIII (3). International Naval Research Organization: 221–233. ISSN 0043-0374.
- Friedman, Norman (2004). US Destroyers: An Illustrated Design History (Revised ed.). Annapolis: Naval Institute Press. ISBN 1-55750-442-3.
- Friedman, Norman (1986). U.S. Battleships: An Illustrated Design History. Annapolis, Maryland: Naval Institute Press. ISBN 0870217151. OCLC 12214729.
- Friedman, Norman (1984). U.S. Cruisers: An Illustrated Design History. Annapolis, Maryland: U.S. Naval Institute Press. ISBN 9780870217180.
- Stille, Mark (2014). Us Heavy Cruisers 1941-45: Pre-War Classes. OSPREY PUB INC. ISBN 9781782006299.
