= Rangekeeper =

Electromechanical fire control computer

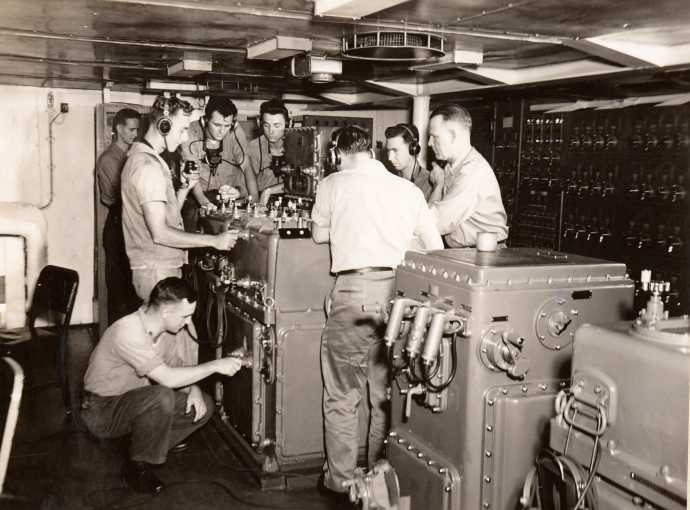
Figure 1: The Ford Mk 1 Ballistic Computer. The name "rangekeeper" began to become inadequate to describe the increasingly complicated functions of rangekeeper. The Mk 1 Ballistic Computer was the first rangekeeper that was referred to as a computer. Note the three pistol grips in the foreground, which are the firing keys of the main guns. The left sounds an alarm that the guns are about to fire, the center fires in automatic mode (Range Keeper controlled), and right is manual firing.

Rangekeepers were electromechanical fire control computers used primarily during the early part of the 20th century. They were sophisticated analog computers whose development reached its zenith following World War II, specifically the Computer Mk 47 in the Mk 68 Gun Fire Control system. During World War II, rangekeepers directed gunfire on land, sea, and in the air. While rangekeepers were widely deployed, the most sophisticated rangekeepers were mounted on warships to direct the fire of long-range guns.

These warship-based computing devices needed to be sophisticated because the problem of calculating gun angles in a naval engagement is very complex. In a naval engagement, both the ship firing the gun and the target are moving with respect to each other. In addition, the ship firing its gun is not a stable platform because it will roll, pitch, and yaw due to wave action, ship change of direction, and board firing. The rangekeeper also performed the required ballistics calculations associated with firing a gun. This article focuses on US Navy shipboard rangekeepers, but the basic principles of operation are applicable to all rangekeepers regardless of where they were deployed.

== Function ==
A rangekeeper is defined as an analog fire control system that performed three functions:

- Target tracking

The rangekeeper continuously computed the current target bearing. This is a difficult task because both the target and the ship firing (generally referred to as "own ship") are moving. This requires knowing the target's range, course, and speed accurately. It also requires accurately knowing the own ship's course and speed.

- Target position prediction

When a gun is fired, it takes time for the projectile to arrive at the target. The rangekeeper must predict where the target will be at the time of projectile arrival. This is the point at which the guns are aimed.

- Gunfire correction

Directing the fire of a long-range weapon to deliver a projectile to a specific location requires many calculations. The projectile point of impact is a function of many variables, including: gun azimuth, gun elevation, wind speed and direction, air resistance, gravity, latitude, gun/sight parallax, barrel wear, powder load, and projectile type.

== History ==
=== Manual fire control ===
The early history of naval fire control was dominated by the engagement of targets within visual range (also referred to as direct fire). In fact, most naval engagements before 1800 were conducted at ranges of 20 to 50 yards (20 to 50 m). Even during the American Civil War, the famous engagement between the USS Monitor and the CSS Virginia was often conducted at less than 100 yards (90 m) range. With time, naval guns became larger and had greater range. At first, the guns were aimed using the technique of artillery spotting. Artillery spotting involved firing a gun at the target, observing the projectile's point of impact (fall of shot), and correcting the aim based on where the shell was observed to land, which became more and more difficult as the range of the gun increased.

=== Predecessor fire control tools and systems ===
Between the American Civil War and 1905, numerous small improvements were made in fire control, such as telescopic sights and optical rangefinders. There were also procedural improvements, like the use of plotting boards to manually predict the position of a ship during an engagement. Around 1905, mechanical fire control aids began to become available, such as the Dreyer Table, Dumaresq (which was also part of the Dreyer Table), and Argo Clock, but these devices took a number of years to become widely deployed. These devices were early forms of rangekeepers.

The issue of directing long-range gunfire came into sharp focus during World War I with the Battle of Jutland. While the British were thought by some to have the finest fire control system in the world at that time, during the Battle of Jutland only 3% of their shots actually struck their targets. At that time, the British primarily used a manual fire control system. The one British ship in the battle that had a mechanical fire control system turned in the best shooting results. This experience contributed to rangekeepers becoming standard issue.

=== Power drives and Remote Power Control (RPC) ===
The US Navy's first deployment of a rangekeeper was on the USS Texas in 1916. Because of the limitations of the technology at that time, the initial rangekeepers were crude. During World War I, the rangekeepers could generate the necessary angles automatically, but sailors had to manually follow the directions of the rangekeepers (a task called "pointer following" or "follow the pointer"). Pointer following could be accurate, but the crews tended to make inadvertent errors when they became fatigued during extended battles. During World War II, servomechanisms (called "power drives" in the U.S. Navy and RPC in the Royal Navy) were developed that allowed the guns to automatically steer to the rangekeeper's commands with no manual intervention. The Mk. 1 and Mk. 1A computers contained approximately 20 servomechanisms, mostly position servos, to minimize torque load on the computing mechanisms. The Royal Navy first installed RPC, experimentally, aboard HMS Champion in 1928. In the 1930s RPC was used for naval searchlight control and during WW2 it was progressively installed on pom-pom mounts and directors, 4-inch, 4.5-inch and 5.25-inch gun mounts.

During their long service life, rangekeepers were updated often as technology advanced, and by World War II they were a critical part of an integrated fire control system. The incorporation of radar into the fire control system early in World War II provided ships with the ability to conduct effective gunfire operations at long range in poor weather and at night.

=== Service in World War II ===
During World War II, rangekeeper capabilities were expanded to the extent that the name "rangekeeper" was deemed to be inadequate. The term "computer," which had been reserved for human calculators, came to be applied to the rangekeeper equipment. After World War II, digital computers began to replace rangekeepers. However, components of the analog rangekeeper system continued in service with the US Navy until the 1990s.

The performance of these analog computers was impressive. The battleship USS North Carolina during a 1945 test was able to maintain an accurate firing solution on a target during a series of high-speed turns. It is a major advantage for a warship to be able to maneuver while engaging a target.

Night naval engagements at long range became feasible when radar data could be input to the rangekeeper. The effectiveness of this combination was demonstrated in November 1942 at the Third Battle of Savo Island when the USS Washington engaged the Japanese battlecruiser Kirishima at a range of 8,400 yards (7.7 km) at night. The Kirishima was set aflame, suffered a number of explosions, and was scuttled by her crew. She had been hit by nine 16-inch (410 mm) rounds out of 75 fired (12% hit rate). The wreck of the Kirishima was discovered in 1992 and showed that the entire bow section of the ship was missing. The Japanese during World War II did not develop radar or automated fire control to the level of the US Navy and were at a significant disadvantage. The Royal Navy began to introduce gyroscopic stabilization of their director gunsights in World War One and by the start of World War Two all warships fitted with director control had gyroscopically controlled gunsights.

The last combat action for the analog rangekeepers, at least for the US Navy, was in the 1991 Persian Gulf War when the rangekeepers on the Iowa-class battleships directed their last rounds in combat.

== Construction ==
Rangekeepers were very large, and the ship designs needed to make provisions to accommodate them. For example, the Ford Mk 1A Computer weighed 3,150 pounds (1,430 kg) The Mk. 1/1A's mechanism support plates, some were up to 1 inch (25 mm) thick, were made of aluminum alloy, but nevertheless, the computer is very heavy. On at least one refloated museum ship, the destroyer USS Cassin Young (now in Boston), the computer and Stable Element more than likely still are below decks, because they are so difficult to remove.

The rangekeepers required a large number of electrical signal cables for synchro data transmission links over which they received information from the various sensors (e.g. gun director, pitometer, rangefinder, gyrocompass) and sent commands to the guns.

These computers also had to be formidably rugged, partly to withstand the shocks created by firing the ship's own guns, and also to withstand the effects of hostile enemy hits to other parts of the ship. They not only needed to continue functioning, but also stay accurate.

The Ford Mark 1/1A mechanism was mounted into a pair of approximately cubical large castings with very wide openings, the latter covered by gasketed castings. Individual mechanisms were mounted onto thick aluminum-alloy plates, and along with interconnecting shafts, were progressively installed into the housing. Progressive assembly meant that future access to much of the computer required progressive disassembly.

The Mk 47 computer was a radical improvement in accessibility over the Mk 1/1A. It was more akin to a tall, wide storage cabinet in shape, with most or all dials on the front vertical surface. Its mechanism was built in six sections, each mounted on very heavy-duty pull-out slides. Behind the panel were typically a horizontal and a vertical mounting plate, arranged in a tee.

== Mechanisms ==
=== The problem of rangekeeping ===
Long-range gunnery is a complex combination of art, science, and mathematics. There are numerous factors that affect the ultimate placement of a projectile and many of these factors are difficult to model accurately. As such, the accuracy of battleship guns was ≈1% of range (sometimes better, sometimes worse). Shell-to-shell repeatability was ≈0.4% of range.

Accurate long-range gunnery requires that a number of factors be taken into account:

- Target course and speed
- Own ship course and speed
- Gravity
- Coriolis effect: Because the Earth is rotating, there is an apparent force acting on the projectile.
- Internal ballistics: Guns do wear, and this aging must be taken into account by keeping an accurate count of the number of projectiles sent through the barrel (this count is reset to zero after the installation of a new liner). There are also shot-to-shot variations due to barrel temperature and interference between guns firing simultaneously.
- External ballistics: Different projectiles have different ballistic characteristics. Also, air conditions have an effect as well (temperature, wind, air pressure).
- Parallax correction: In general, the position of the gun and target spotting equipment (radar, mounted on the gun director, pelorus, etc) are in different locations on a ship. This creates a parallax error for which corrections must be made.
- Projectile characteristics (e.g. ballistic coefficient)
- Powder charge weight and temperature

The calculations to predict and compensate for all these factors are complicated, frequent and error-prone when done by hand. Part of the complexity came from the amount of information that must be integrated from many different sources. For example, information from the following sensors, calculators, and visual aids must be integrated to generate a solution:

- Gyrocompass: This device provides an accurate true north own ship course.
- Rangefinders: Optical devices for determining the range to a target.
- Pitometer Logs: These devices provided an accurate measurement of the own ship's speed.
- Range clocks: These devices provided a prediction of the target's range at the time of projectile impact if the gun was fired now. This function could be considered "range keeping".
- Angle clocks: This device provided a prediction of the target's bearing at the time of projectile impact if the gun was fired now.
- Plotting board: A map of the gunnery platform and target that allowed predictions to be made as to the future position of a target. (The compartment ("room") where the Mk.1 and Mk.1A computers was located was called "Plot" for historical reasons.)
- Various slide rules: These devices performed the various calculations required to determine the required gun azimuth and elevation.
- Meteorological sensors: Temperature, wind speed, and humidity all have an effect on the ballistics of a projectile. U.S. Navy rangekeepers and analog computers did not consider different wind speeds at differing altitudes.

To increase speed and reduce errors, the military felt a dire need to automate these calculations. To illustrate the complexity, Table 1 lists the types of input for the Ford Mk 1 Rangekeeper (ca 1931).

Table 1: Manual Inputs Into Pre-WWII Rangekeeper
Variable	Data Source
Range	Phoned from range finder
Own ship course	Gyrocompass repeater
Own ship speed	Pitometer log
Target course	Initial estimates for rate control
Target speed	Initial estimates for rate control
Target bearing	Automatically from director
Spotting data	Spotter, by telephone

However, even with all this data, the rangekeeper's position predictions were not infallible. The rangekeeper's prediction characteristics could be used against it. For example, many captains under long-range gun attack would make violent maneuvers to "chase salvos" or "steer for the fall of shot," i.e., maneuver to the position of the last salvo splashes. Because the rangekeepers are constantly predicting new positions for the target, it was unlikely that subsequent salvos would strike the position of the previous salvo. Practical rangekeepers had to assume that targets were moving in a straight-line path at a constant speed, to keep complexity within acceptable limits. A sonar rangekeeper was built to track a target circling at a constant radius of turn, but that function was disabled.

=== General technique ===
The data were transmitted by rotating shafts. These were mounted in ball-bearing brackets fastened to the support plates. Most corners were at right angles, facilitated by miter gears in 1:1 ratio. The Mk. 47, which was modularized into six sections on heavy-duty slides, connected the sections together with shafts in the back of the cabinet. Shrewd design meant that the data carried by these shafts required no manual zeroing or alignment; only their movement mattered. The aided-tracking output from an integrator roller is one such example. When the section was slid back into normal position, the shaft couplings mated as soon as the shafts rotated.

Common mechanisms in the Mk. 1/1A included many miter-gear differentials, a group of four 3-D cams, some disk-ball-roller integrators, and servo motors with their associated mechanism; all of these had bulky shapes. However, most of the computing mechanisms were thin stacks of wide plates of various shapes and functions. A given mechanism might be up to 1 inch (25 mm) thick, possibly less, and more than a few were maybe 14 inches (36 cm) across. Space was at a premium, but for precision calculations, more width permitted a greater total range of movement to compensate for slight inaccuracies, stemming from looseness in sliding parts.

The Mk. 47 was a hybrid, doing some computing electrically, and the rest mechanically. It had gears and shafts, differentials, and totally enclosed disk-ball-roller integrators. However, it had no mechanical multipliers or resolvers ("component solvers"); these functions were performed electronically, with multiplication carried out using precision potentiometers.

In the Mk. 1/1A, however, excepting the electrical drive servos, all computing was mechanical.

=== Implementations of mathematical functions ===
The implementation methods used in analog computers were many and varied. The fire control equations implemented during World War II on analog rangekeepers are the same equations implemented later on digital computers. The key difference is that the rangekeepers solved the equations mechanically. While mathematical functions are not often implemented mechanically today, mechanical methods exist to implement all the common mathematical operations. Some examples include:

- Addition and subtraction

Differential gears, usually referred to by technicians simply as "differentials", were often used to perform addition and subtraction operations. The Mk. 1A contained approximately 160 of them. The history of this gearing for computing dates to antiquity (see Antikythera mechanism).

- Multiplication by a constant

Gear ratios were very extensively used to multiply a value by a constant.

- Multiplication of two variables

The Mk. 1 and Mk.1A computer multipliers were based on the geometry of similar triangles.

- Sine and cosine generation (polar-to-rectangular coordinate conversion)

These mechanisms would be called resolvers, today; they were called "component solvers" in the mechanical era. In most instances, they resolved an angle and magnitude (radius) into sine and cosine components, with a mechanism consisting of two perpendicular Scotch yokes. A variable crankpin radius handled the magnitude of the vector in question.

- Integration

Ball-and-disk integrators performed the integration operation. As well, four small Ventosa integrators in the Mk. 1 and Mk. 1A computers scaled rate-control corrections according to angles.

The integrators had rotating discs and a full-width roller mounted in a hinged casting, pulled down toward the disc by two strong springs. Twin balls permitted free movement of the radius input with the disk stopped, something done at least daily for static tests. Integrators were made with discs of 3, 4 and 5 inch (7.6, 10 and 12.5 cm) diameters, the larger being more accurate. Ford Instrument Company integrators had a clever mechanism for minimizing wear when the ball-carrier carriage was in one position for extended periods.

- Component integrators

Component integrators were essentially Ventosa integrators, all enclosed. Think of a traditional heavy-ball computer mouse and its pickoff rollers at right angles to each other. Underneath the ball is a roller that turns to rotate the mouse ball. However, the shaft of that roller can be set to any angle you want. In the Mk. 1/1A, a rate-control correction (keeping the sights on target) rotated the ball, and the two pickoff rollers at the sides distributed the movement appropriately according to angle. That angle depended upon the geometry of the moment, such as which way the target was heading.

- Differentiation

Differentiation was performed by using an integrator in a feedback loop.

- Functions of one variable

Rangekeepers used a number of cams to generate function values. Many face cams (flat discs with wide spiral grooves) were used in both rangekeepers. For surface fire control (the Mk. 8 Range Keeper), a single flat cam was sufficient to define ballistics.

- Functions of two variables

In the Mk. 1 and Mk 1A computers, four three-dimensional cams were needed. These used cylindrical coordinates for their inputs, one being the rotation of the cam, and the other being the linear position of the ball follower. The radial displacement of the follower yielded the output.

The four cams in the Mk. 1/1A computer provided mechanical time fuse setting, time of flight (this time is from firing to bursting at or near the target), time of flight divided by predicted range, and superelevation combined with vertical parallax correction. (Superelevation is essentially the amount the gun barrel needs to be raised to compensate for gravity drop.)

=== Servo speed stabilization ===
The Mk.1 and Mk.1A computers were electromechanical, and many of their mechanical calculations required drive movements of precise speeds. They used reversible two-phase capacitor-run induction motors with tungsten contacts. These were stabilized primarily by rotary magnetic drag (eddy-current) slip clutches, similar to classical rotating-magnet speedometers, but with a much higher torque. One part of the drag was geared to the motor, and the other was constrained by a fairly stiff spring. This spring offset the null position of the contacts by an amount proportional to motor speed, thus providing velocity feedback. Flywheels mounted on the motor shafts, but coupled by magnetic drags, prevented contact chatter when the motor was at rest. Unfortunately, the flywheels must also have slowed down the servos somewhat. A more elaborate scheme, which placed a rather large flywheel and differential between the motor and the magnetic drag, eliminated velocity error for critical data, such as gun orders.

The Mk. 1 and Mk. 1A computer integrator discs required a particularly elaborate system to provide constant and precise drive speeds. They used a motor with its speed regulated by a clock escapement, cam-operated contacts, and a jeweled-bearing spur-gear differential. Although the speed oscillated slightly, the total inertia made it effectively a constant-speed motor. At each tick, contacts switched on motor power, then the motor opened the contacts again. It was in effect slow pulse-width modulation of motor power according to load. When running, the computer had a unique sound as motor power was switched on and off at each tick—dozens of gear meshes inside the cast-metal computer housing spread out the ticking into a "chunk-chunk" sound.

=== Assembly ===
A detailed description of how to dismantle and reassemble the system was contained in the two-volume Navy Ordnance Pamphlet OP 1140 with several hundred pages and several hundred photographs. When reassembling, shaft connections between mechanisms had to be loosened and the mechanisms mechanically moved so that an output of one mechanism was at the same numerical setting (such as zero) as the input to the other. Fortunately these computers were especially well-made, and very reliable.

== Related targeting systems ==
During WWII, all the major warring powers developed rangekeepers to different levels. Rangekeepers were only one member of a class of electromechanical computers used for fire control during World War II. Related analog computing hardware used by the United States included:

- Norden bombsight

US bombers used the Norden bombsight, which used similar technology to the rangekeeper for predicting bomb impact points.

- Torpedo Data Computer (TDC)

US submarines used the TDC to compute torpedo launch angles. This device also had a rangekeeping function that was referred to as "position keeping." This was the only submarine-based fire control computer during World War II that performed target tracking. Because space within a submarine hull is limited, the TDC designers overcame significant packaging challenges in order to mount the TDC within the allocated volume.

- M-9/SCR-584 Anti-Aircraft System

This equipment was used to direct air defense artillery. It made a particularly good account of itself against the V-1 flying bombs.

== See also ==
- Director (military)
- Gun data computer
- Fire-control system
- Kerrison Predictor

== Bibliography ==
- Brooks, John (2004). "Re: Questions on the Effectiveness of U.S. Navy Battleship Gunnery (W.I., 41 no. 1 (2004): 54)". Warship International. XLI (3): 260–262. ISSN 0043-0374.
- Brooks, John (2006). "Re: Questions on the Effectiveness of U.S. Navy Battleship Gunnery, Part II". Warship International. XLIII (1): 43–46. ISSN 0043-0374.
- Brooks, John (2005). "Re: Questions on the Effectiveness of U.S. Navy Battleship Gunnery, Part III". Warship International. XLII (3): 264–266. ISSN 0043-0374.
- Campbell, John (1985). Naval Weapons of World War Two. Naval Institute Press. ISBN 0-87021-459-4.
- Fairfield, A.P. (1921). Naval Ordnance. The Lord Baltimore Press.
- Frieden, David R. (1985). Principles of Naval Weapons Systems. Naval Institute Press. ISBN 0-87021-537-X.
- Friedman, Norman (2008). Naval Firepower: Battleship Guns and Gunnery in the Dreadnought Era. Seaforth. ISBN 978-1-84415-701-3.
- Pollen, Antony (1980). The Great Gunnery Scandal - The Mystery of Jutland. Collins. ISBN 0-00-216298-9.
- Wright, Christopher C. (2004). "Questions on the Effectiveness of U.S. Navy Battleship Gunnery: Notes on the Origin of U.S. Navy Gun Fire Control System Range Keepers". Warship International. XLI (1): 55–78. ISSN 0043-0374.
- Wright, Christopher C. (2004). "Questions on the Effectiveness of U.S. Navy Battleship Gunnery: Notes on the Origins of U.S. Navy Gun Fire Control System Range Keepers, Part II". Warship International. XLI (3): 288–311. ISSN 0043-0374.
- Wright, Christopher C. (2005). "Questions on the Effectiveness of U.S. Navy Battleship Gunnery: Notes on the Origins of U.S. Navy Gun Fire Control System Range Keepers, Part III". Warship International. XLII (1): 61–105. ISSN 0043-0374.
