= Target angle =

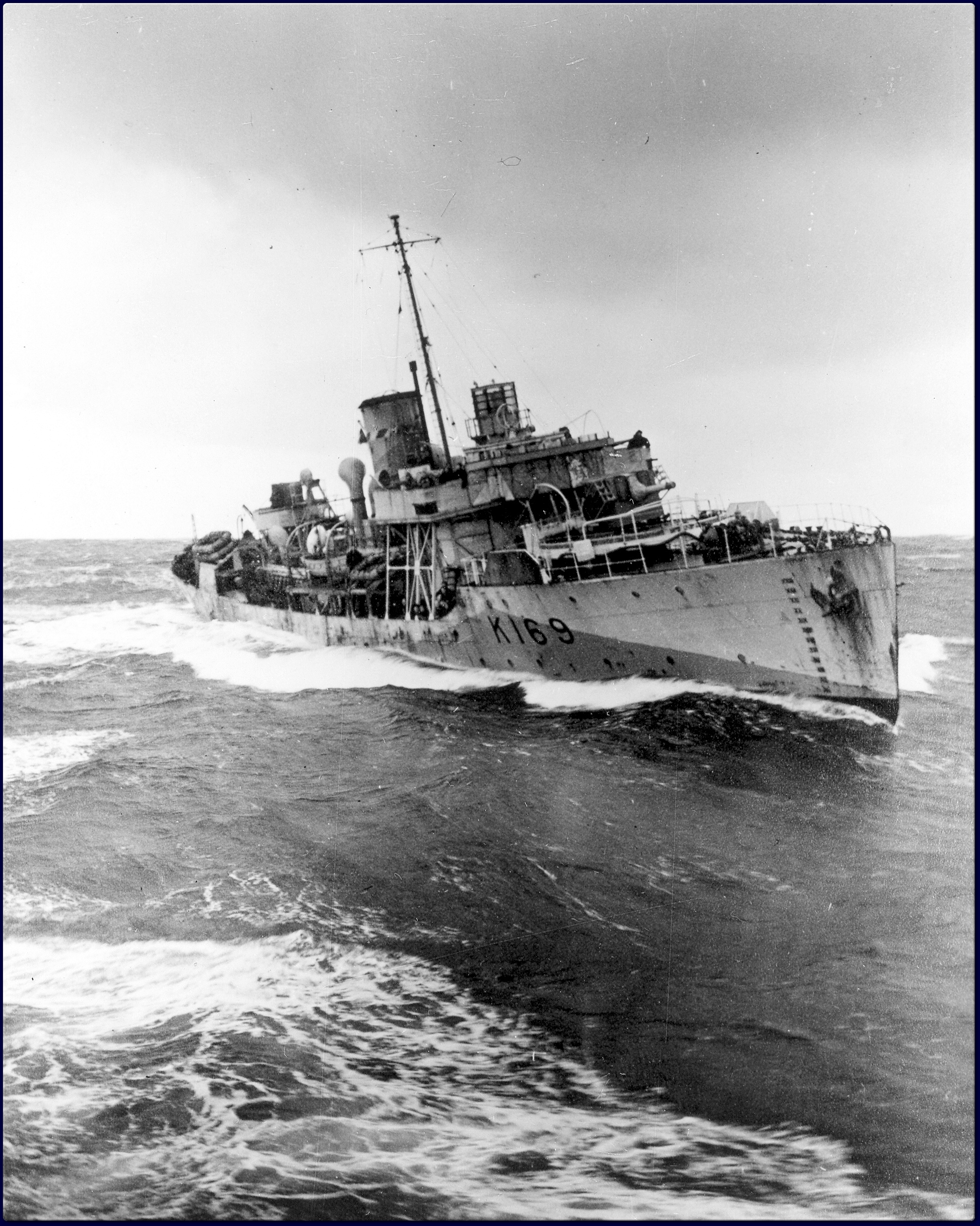
Target angle: 30° Angle on the bow: Starboard 30°

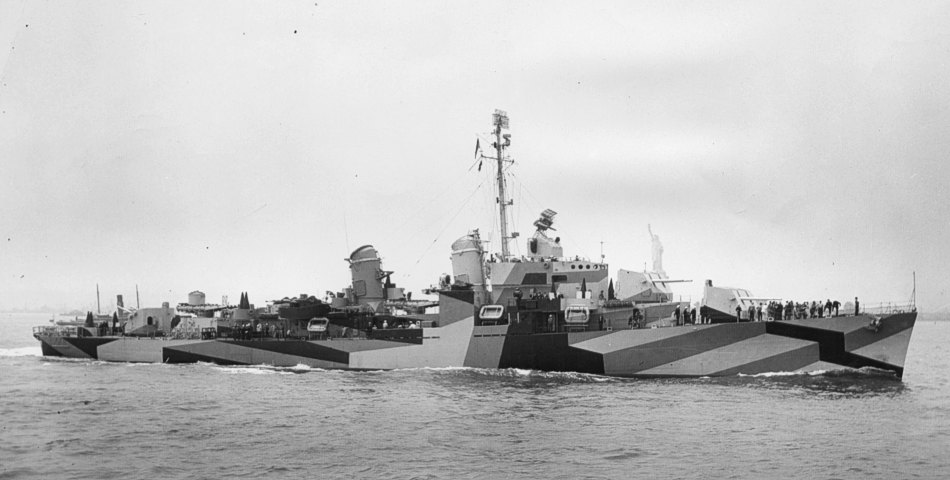
Target angle: 75° Angle on the bow: Starboard 75°

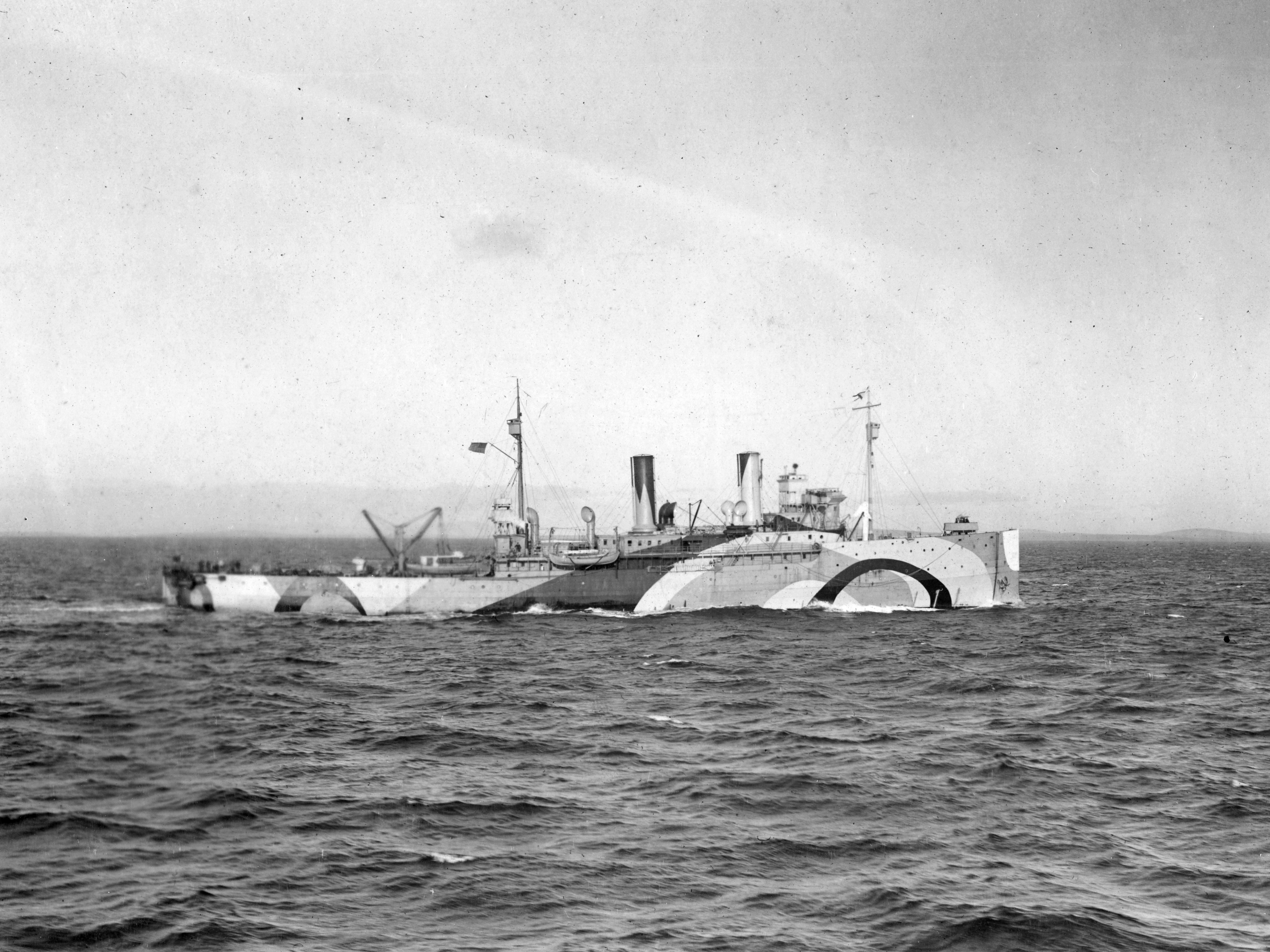
Target angle: 110° Angle on the bow: Starboard 110°

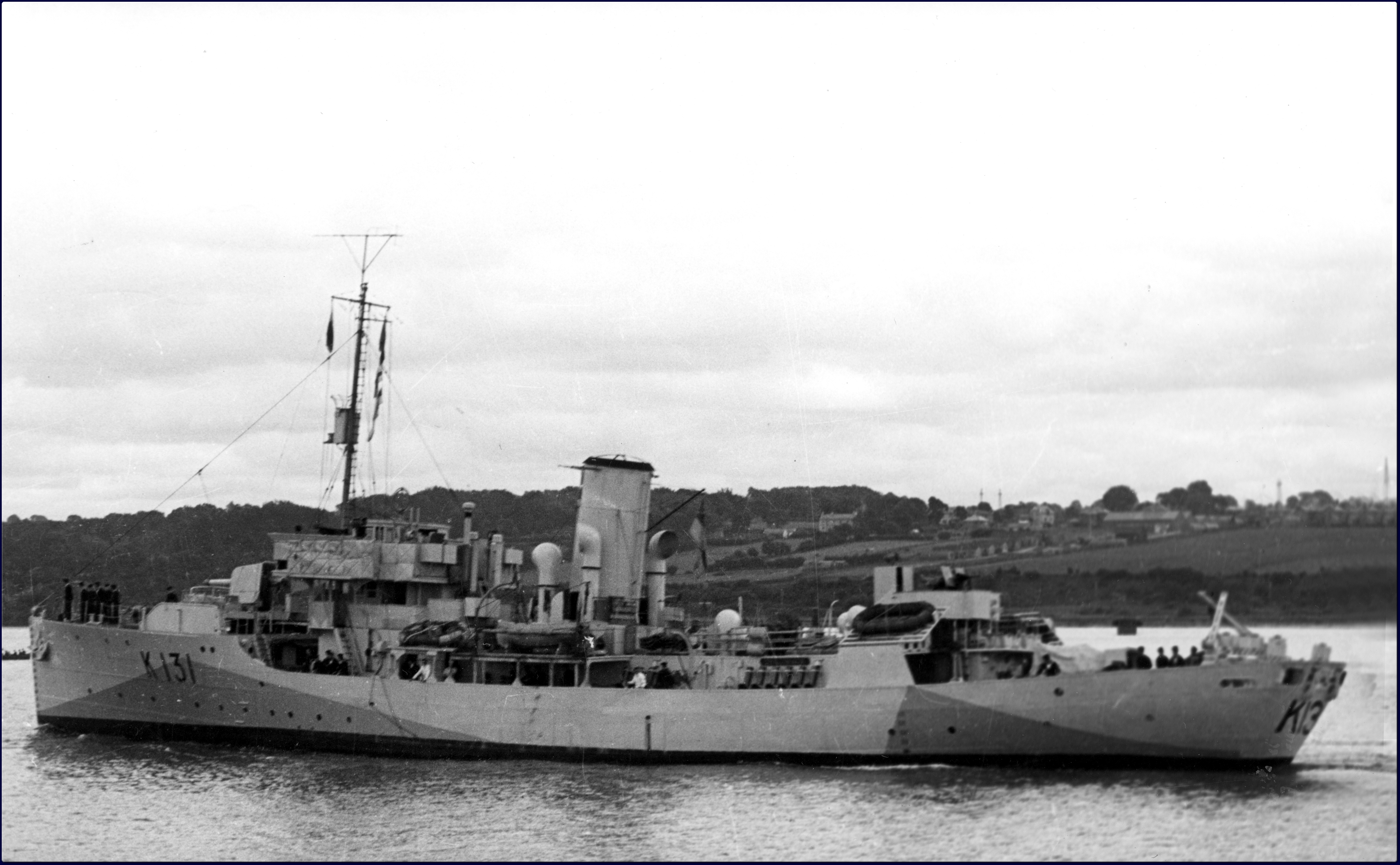
Target angle: 240° Angle on the bow: Port 120°

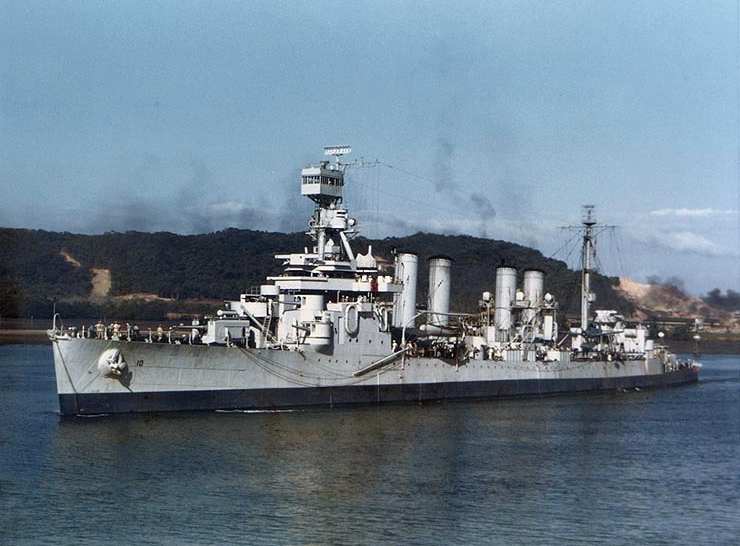
Target angle: 300° Angle on the bow: Port 60°

Target angle is the relative bearing of the observing station from the vehicle being observed. It may be used to compute point-of-aim for a fire-control problem when vehicle range and speed can be estimated from other information. Target angle may be best explained from the example of a submarine preparing to launch a straight-run (non-homing) torpedo at a moving target ship. Since the torpedo travels relatively slowly, the torpedo course must be set not toward the target, but toward where the target will be when the torpedo reaches it. Target angle is used to estimate target course.

The submarine observer estimating target angle pictures himself on the target ship looking back at the submarine. Relative bearing of the submarine is the clockwise angle in degrees from the heading of the target ship to a straight line drawn from the target ship to the submarine.

When target angle is 0° (or 360° ) the target ship is coming directly toward the submarine.

Target angles between 0° and 90° indicate the target ship is moving toward and to the right of the submarine.

Target angles between 90° and 180° indicate the target ship is moving to the right and away from the submarine.

When target angle is 180° the target ship is moving directly away from the submarine.

Target angles between 180° and 270° indicate the target ship is moving away from and to the left of the submarine.

Target angles between 270° and 360° indicate the target ship is moving to the left and toward the submarine.

A target passing a stationary observer from left to right might have target angles progressing from 45° to 135° , with broadside facing of 90° marking the minimum distance between target and observer. A target moving from right to left on the same track would have target angles progressing downward from 315° to 225° with the closest point of approach occurring at 270° .

== Angle on the bow ==
Angle on the bow is a variation of target angle used by Naval submarines. Angle on the bow is measured over an arc of 180° clockwise from the bow if viewing the starboard side of the target, or counterclockwise from the bow if viewing the port side of the target. Target angles from 0° to 180° are reported as "starboard [target angle]", while target angles from 180° to 360° are reported as "port [360° -target angle]".

Angle on the bow provided the basis for submarine attack decisions through the world wars. When angle on the bow was less than 90° , the submarine would continue a submerged approach toward the target to launch torpedoes when angle on the bow increased to 90° indicating the minimum range torpedo launch opportunity for the submarine with the given target course and speed. Unless the target was already within torpedo range, angle on the bow greater than 90° required the submarine to attempt to surface and run around the target beyond visual range to submerge ahead of the target. As a practical matter, the speed differential required to run around a target meant most warships and ocean liners could not be attacked when angle on the bow was greater than 90° .

Estimation of target angle is based on the observer's visual identification of target features like differentiating the bow from the stern. Dazzle camouflage patterns pictured in the black and white images illustrate a form of ship camouflage attempting to impair an observer's recognition of ship features.
