= Convoy PQ 8 =

Arctic convoy sent to aid the Soviet Union during World War II

- Part of Arctic Convoys of the Second World War
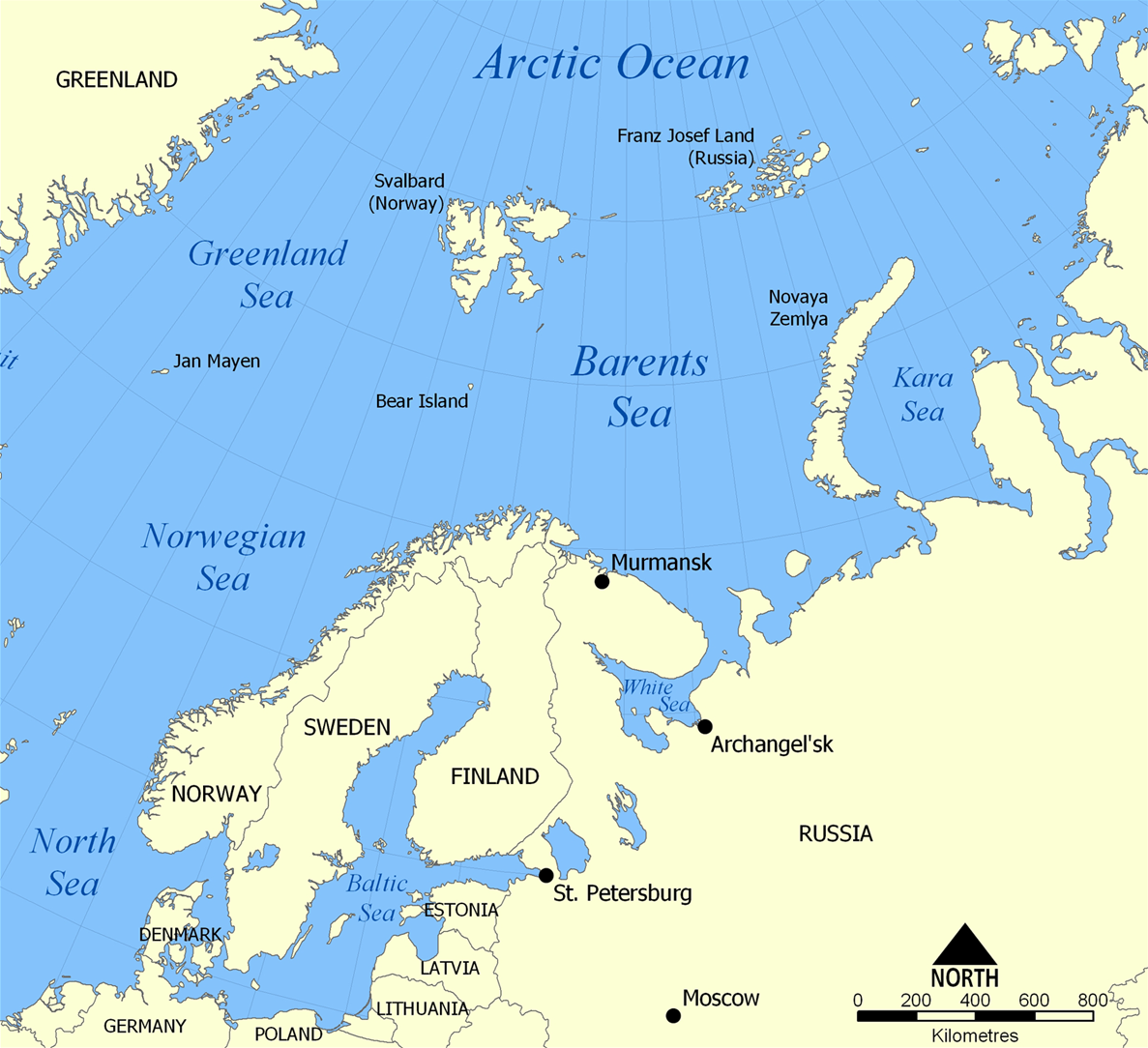
- The Norwegian and the Barents seas, site of the Arctic convoys
Date	8–17 January 1942
Location	Arctic Ocean
Result	British victory

Belligerents
Royal Navy; Merchant Navy	(Nazi Germany) Luftwaffe; Kriegsmarine

Commanders and leaders
Escorts: L. S. Saunders; Convoy: R. W. Brundle	Hans-Jürgen Stumpff; Hermann Böhm

Casualties and losses
1 destroyer sunk; 1 merchantman damaged	

Convoy PQ 8 (8–17 January 1942) was an Arctic convoy of the Western Allies to aid the Soviet Union during the Second World War. The convoy left Iceland on 8 January 1942. On 12 January the convoy had to turn south to avoid ice; the weather was calm, visibility was exceptional, with a short period of twilight around noon. The convoy arrived in Murmansk nine days later.

Having ignored earlier convoys, the Germans had begun to reinforce their forces in Norway and assembled the first U-boat wolfpack in the Arctic against Convoy PQ 8. On 17 January, U-454 of wolfpack Ulan damaged the merchant ship SS Harmatris and sank the destroyer HMS Matabele with the loss of all but two of its crew, when the convoy had almost reached Murmansk. The rest of the convoy reached Murmansk that day; Harmatris was towed into harbour on 20 January.

Harmatris was stranded in Russia by the winter weather, a lack of labour to repair the torpedo damage, frequent air attacks on Murmansk by the Luftwaffe and the cessation of convoys after the disaster of Convoy PQ 17. Harmatris sailed for Arkhangelsk on 21 July. Not until Convoy QP 14 (13–26 September 1942) was Harmatris able to make the return journey.

== Background ==
=== Lend-lease ===
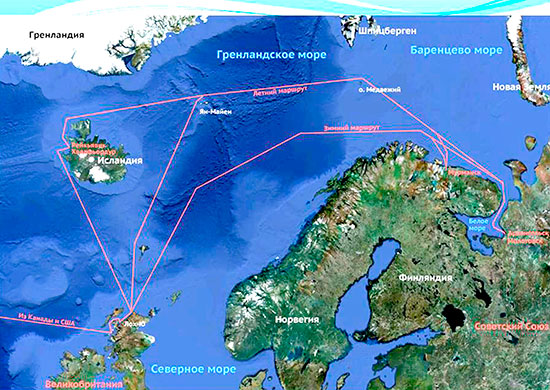
Russian map showing Arctic convoy routes from Britain and Iceland, past Norway to the Barents Sea and northern Russian ports

After Operation Barbarossa, the German invasion of the USSR, began on 22 June 1941, the UK and USSR signed an agreement in July that they would "render each other assistance and support of all kinds in the present war against Hitlerite Germany". Before September 1941 the British had dispatched 450 aircraft, 22,000 long tons (22,000 t) of rubber, 3,000,000 pairs of boots and stocks of tin, aluminium, jute, lead and wool. In September British and US representatives travelled to Moscow to study Soviet requirements and their ability to meet them. The representatives of the three countries drew up a protocol in October 1941 to last until June 1942 and to agree new protocols to operate from 1 July to 30 June of each following year until the end of Lend-Lease. The protocol listed supplies, monthly rates of delivery and totals for the period.

The supplies to be sent were specified but not the ships to move them. The USSR turned out to lack the ships and escorts and the British and Americans, who had made a commitment to "help with the delivery", undertook to deliver the supplies for want of an alternative. The main Soviet need in 1941 was military equipment to replace losses because, at the time of the negotiations, two large aircraft factories were being moved east from Leningrad and two more from Ukraine. It would take at least eight months to resume production, until when, aircraft output would fall from 80 to 30 aircraft per day. Britain and the US undertook to send 400 aircraft a month, at a ratio of three bombers to one fighter (later reversed) 500 tanks a month and 300 Bren gun carriers. The Anglo-Americans also undertook to send 42,000 long tons (43,000 t) of aluminium and 3,862 machine tools, with sundry raw materials, food and medical supplies.

=== British grand strategy ===
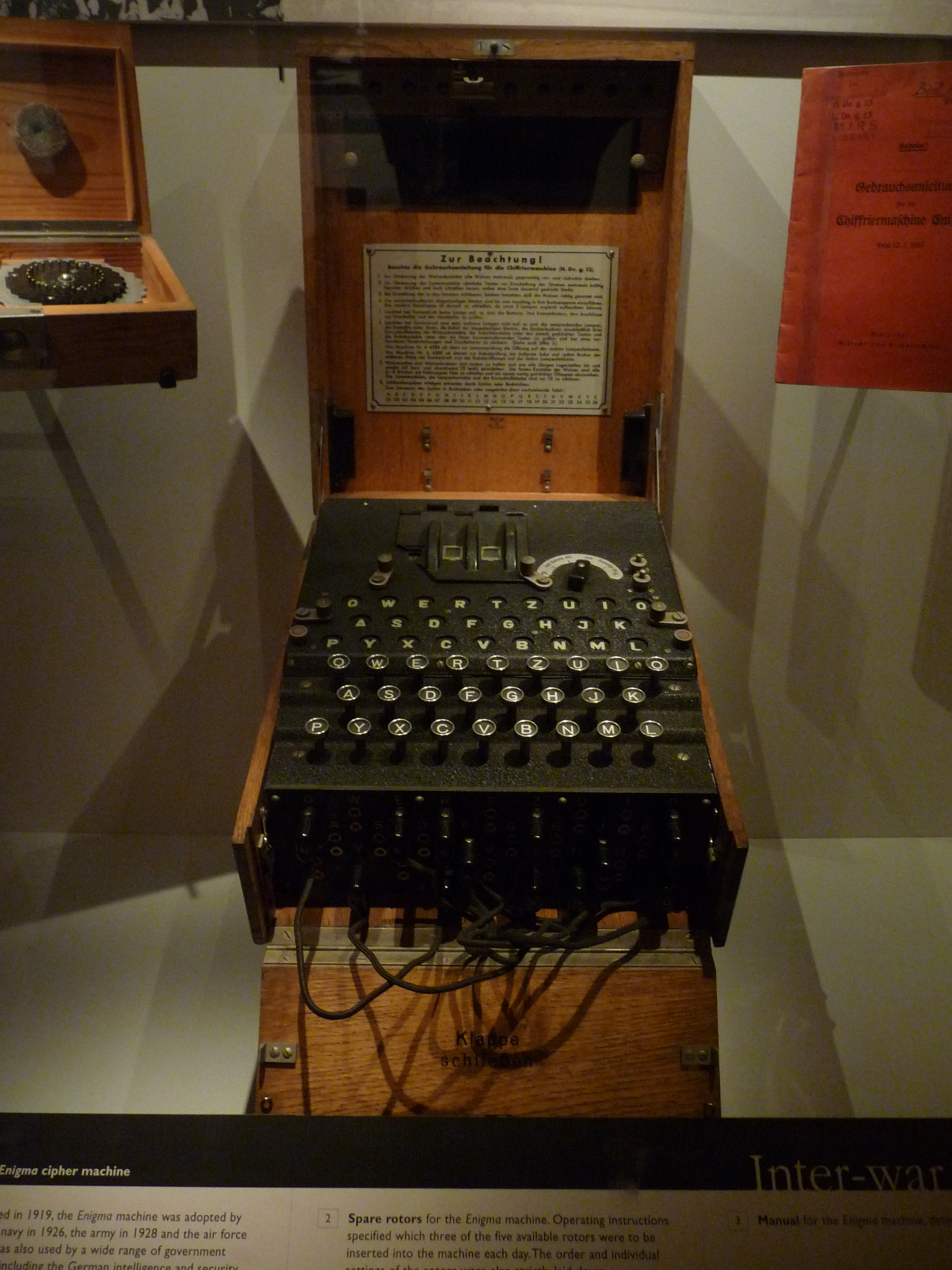
An Enigma coding machine

The growing German air strength in Norway and increasing losses to convoys and their escorts, led Rear-Admiral Stuart Bonham Carter, commander of the 18th Cruiser Squadron, Admiral Sir John Tovey, Commander in Chief Home Fleet and Admiral Sir Dudley Pound the First Sea Lord, the professional head of the Royal Navy, unanimously to advocate the suspension of Arctic convoys during the summer months.

==== Bletchley Park ====
The British Government Code and Cypher School (GC&CS) based at Bletchley Park housed a small industry of code-breakers and traffic analysts. By June 1941, the German Enigma machine Home Waters (Heimish) settings used by surface ships and U-boats could quickly be read. On 1 February 1942, the Enigma machines used in U-boats in the Atlantic and Mediterranean were changed but German ships and the U-boats in Arctic waters continued with the older Heimish (Hydra from 1942, Dolphin to the British). By mid-1941, British Y-stations were able to receive and read Luftwaffe W/T transmissions and give advance warning of Luftwaffe operations. In 1941, naval Headache personnel with receivers to eavesdrop on Luftwaffe wireless transmissions were embarked on warships.

==== B-Dienst ====
The rival German Beobachtungsdienst (B-Dienst, Observation Service) of the Kriegsmarine Marinenachrichtendienst (MND, Naval Intelligence Service) had broken several Admiralty codes and cyphers by 1939, which were used to help Kriegsmarine ships elude British forces and provide opportunities for surprise attacks. From June to August 1940, six British submarines were sunk in the Skaggerak using information gleaned from British wireless signals. In 1941, B-Dienst read signals from the Commander in Chief Western Approaches informing convoys of areas patrolled by U-boats, enabling the submarines to move into "safe" zones. (B-Dienst broke Naval Cypher No 3 in February 1942 and by March was reading up to 80 per cent of the traffic. By coincidence, the British lost access to the Atlantic U-boat communications with the introduction of the Shark cypher and had no information to send in Cypher No 3 which might compromise Ultra.

=== Arctic Ocean ===
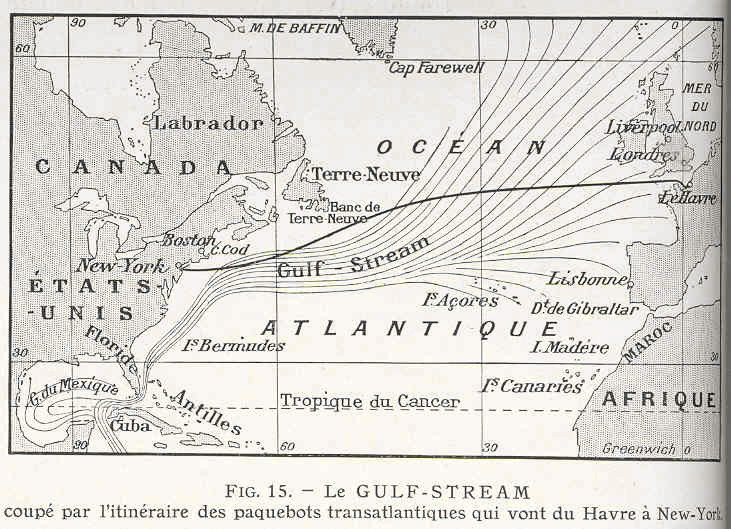
Diagrammatic representation of the course of the Gulf Stream

Between Greenland and Norway are some of the most stormy waters of the world's oceans, 890 mi (1,440 km) of water under gales full of snow, sleet and hail. The cold Arctic water is met by the Gulf Stream, warm water from the Gulf of Mexico, which becomes the North Atlantic Drift. Arriving at the south-west of England the drift moves between Scotland and Iceland; north of Norway the drift splits. One stream bears north of Bear Island to Svalbard and a southern stream follows the coast of Murmansk into the Barents Sea. The mingling of cold Arctic water and warmer water of higher salinity generates thick banks of fog for convoys to hide in but the waters drastically reduced the effectiveness of ASDIC as U-boats moved in waters of differing temperatures and density.

In winter, polar ice can form as far south as 50 mi (80 km) off the North Cape and in summer it can recede to Svalbard. The area is in perpetual darkness in winter and permanent daylight in the summer and can make air reconnaissance almost impossible. Around the North Cape and in the Barents Sea the sea temperature rarely rises about 4° Celsius and a person in the water will die unless rescued immediately. The cold water and air makes spray freeze on the superstructures of ships, which has to be removed quickly to prevent ships becoming top-heavy. Conditions in U-boats were, if anything, worse, the boats having to submerge in warmer water to rid the superstructure of ice. Crewmen on watch were exposed to the elements, oil lost its viscosity, nuts froze and sheared off. Heaters in the hull were too demanding of current to be run continuously.

== Prelude ==
=== Kriegsmarine ===
German naval forces in Norway were commanded by Hermann Böhm, the Kommandierender Admiral Norwegen. Two U-boats were based in Norway in July 1941, four in September, five in December and four in January 1942. By mid-February twenty U-boats were anticipated in the region, with six based in Norway, two in Narvik or Tromsø, two at Trondheim and two at Bergen. Hitler contemplated establishing a unified command but decided against it. The German battleship Tirpitz arrived at Trondheim on 16 January, the first ship of a general transfer of surface ships to Norway. British convoys to Russia had received little attention, since they averaged only eight ships each and the long Arctic winter nights negated even the limited Luftwaffe effort that was available.

=== Luftflotte 5 ===
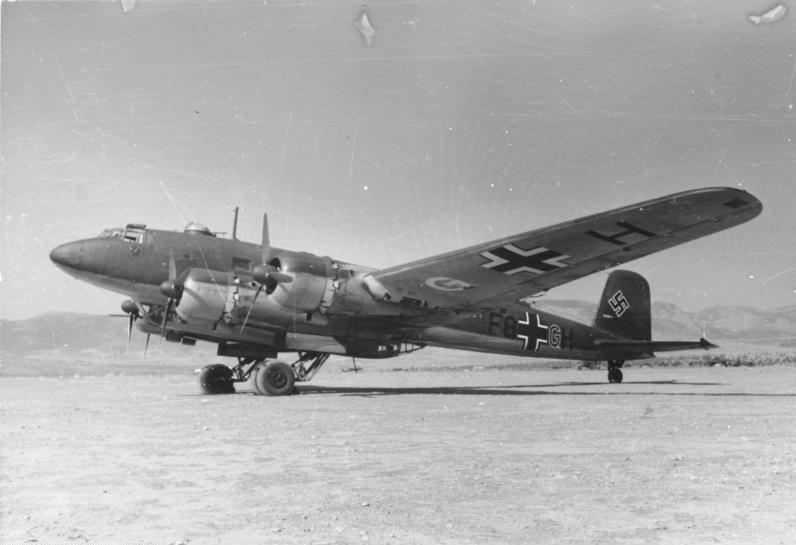
A Focke-Wulf Fw 200 Kondor of KG 40

In mid-1941, Luftflotte 5 (Air Fleet 5) had been re-organised for Operation Barbarossa when Luftgau Norwegen (Air Region Norway) was headquartered in Oslo. Fliegerführer Stavanger (Air Commander Stavanger) the centre and north of Norway, Jagdfliegerführer Norwegen (Fighter Leader Norway) commanded the fighter force and Fliegerführer Kerkenes (Oberst [colonel] Andreas Nielsen) in the far north had airfields at Kirkenes and Banak. The Air Fleet had 180 aircraft, sixty of which were reserved for operations on the Karelian Front against the Red Army. The distance from Banak to Arkhangelsk was 560 mi (900 km) and Fliegerführer Kerkenes had only ten Junkers Ju 88 bombers of Kampfgeschwader 30, thirty Stukas, ten Messerschmitt Bf 109 fighters of Jagdgeschwader 77, five Messerschmitt Bf 110 heavy fighters of Zerstörergeschwader 76, ten reconnaissance aircraft and an anti-aircraft battalion.

Sixty aircraft were far from adequate in such a climate and terrain where "there is no favourable season for operations" (Earl F. Ziemke). The emphasis of air operations changed from army support to anti-shipping operations as Allied Arctic convoys became more frequent. Hubert Schmundt, the Admiral Nordmeer noted gloomily on 22 December 1941 that the number long-range reconnaissance aircraft was exiguous and from 1 to 15 December only two Ju 88 sorties had been possible. After the Lofoten Raids (Operation Claymore) Schmundt wanted Luftflotte 5 to transfer aircraft to northern Norway but its commander, Generaloberst Hans-Jürgen Stumpff, was reluctant to deplete the defences of western Norway. Despite this some air units were transferred, a catapult ship (Katapultschiff), MS Schwabenland, was sent to northern Norway and Heinkel He 115 floatplane torpedo-bombers, of Küstenfliegergruppe 1./406 was transferred to Sola. By the end of 1941, III Gruppe, KG 30 had been transferred to Norway and in the new year, another Staffel of Focke-Wulf Fw 200 Kondors from Kampfgeschwader 40 (KG 40) had arrived. Luftflotte 5 was also expected to receive a Gruppe comprising three Staffeln (squadrons) of Heinkel He 111 torpedo-bombers.

==== Air-sea rescue ====
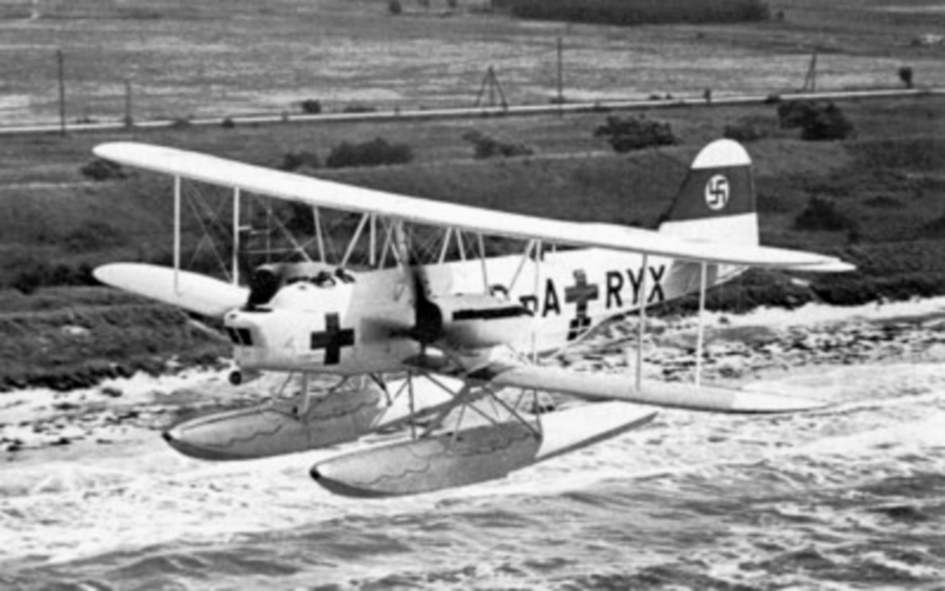
Example of a Heinkel He 59 search and rescue aircraft (1940)

The Luftwaffe Sea Rescue Service (Seenotdienst) along with the Kriegsmarine, the Norwegian Society for Sea Rescue (RS) and ships on passage, recovered aircrew and shipwrecked sailors. The service comprised Seenotbereich VIII at Stavanger, covering Bergen and Trondheim with Seenotbereich IX at Kirkenes for Tromsø, Billefjord and Kirkenes. Co-operation was as important in rescues as it was in anti-shipping operations if people were to be saved before they succumbed to the climate and severe weather.

The sea rescue aircraft comprised Heinkel He 59 floatplanes with Dornier Do 18 and Dornier Do 24 seaplanes. Oberkommando der Luftwaffe (OKL, the high command of the Luftwaffe) was not able to increase the number of search and rescue aircraft in Norway, due to a general shortage of aircraft and crews, despite Stumpff pointing out that coming down in such cold waters required extremely swift recovery and that his crews "must be given a chance of rescue" or morale could not be maintained.

=== Arctic convoys ===
A convoy was defined as at least one merchant ship sailing under the protection of at least one warship. At first the British had intended to run convoys to Russia on a forty-day cycle (the number of days between convoy departures) during the winter of 1941–1942 but this was shortened to a ten-day cycle. The round trip to Murmansk for warships was three weeks and each convoy needed a cruiser and two destroyers, which severely depleted the Home Fleet. Convoys left port and rendezvoused with the escorts at sea. A cruiser provided distant cover from a position to the west of Bear Island. Air support was limited to 330 Squadron and 269 Squadron, RAF Coastal Command from Iceland, with some help from anti-submarine patrols from Sullom Voe, in Shetland, along the coast of Norway. Anti-submarine trawlers escorted the convoys on the first part of the outbound journey. Built for Arctic conditions, the trawlers were coal-burning ships with sufficient endurance. The trawlers were commanded by their peacetime crews and captains with the rank of Skipper, Royal Naval Reserve (RNR), who were used to Arctic conditions, supplemented by anti-submarine specialists of the Royal Naval Volunteer Reserve (RNVR). British minesweepers based at Arkhangelsk met the convoys to join the escort for the remainder of the voyage.

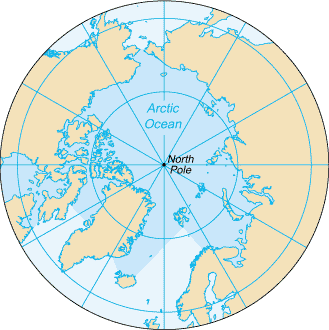
Diagram of the Arctic Ocean

By late 1941, the convoy system used in the Atlantic had been established on the Arctic run; a convoy commodore briefed the ships' masters and signals officers on arrangements for the management of the convoy, that sailed in a formation of long rows of short columns. The commodore was usually a retired naval officer or from the Royal Naval Reserve whose merchant ship flew a white pendant with a blue cross. The commodore was assisted by a Naval signals party of four men, who used lamps, semaphore flags and telescopes to pass signals in code. Codebooks were carried in a weighted bag which was to be dumped overboard to prevent capture. In large convoys, the commodore had a vice- and rear-commodore with whom he directed the speed, course and zig-zagging of the merchant ships and liaised with the escort commander.

In October 1941, the Prime Minister, Winston Churchill, had promised an Arctic convoy to the USSR every ten days. The unloading capacity of Arkhangelsk was 300,000 long tons (300,000 t), Vladivostok (Pacific Route) 140,000 long tons (140,000 t) and 60,000 long tons (61,000 t) in the Persian Gulf (for the Persian Corridor route) ports. The first convoy was due at Murmansk around 12 October and the next convoy was to depart Iceland on 22 October. A motley of British, Allied and neutral shipping, loaded with military stores and raw materials for the Soviet war effort would be assembled at Hvalfjörður (Hvalfiord) in Iceland, convenient for ships from both sides of the Atlantic. In winter, due to the polar ice expanding southwards, the convoy route ran closer to Norway. The voyage was between 1,400 and 2,000 nmi (2,600 and 3,700 km; 1,600 and 2,300 mi) each way, taking at least three weeks for a round trip.

=== Convoy PQ 8 ===
Icelandic anchorages

Convoy PQ 8 consisted of eight merchant ships; the British tankers British Pride and British Workman and the British merchant ships Dartford, Southgate and Harmatris (convoy commodore, R. W. Brundle embarked), the Soviet Starii Bolshevik, Larranga, the first US ship on the Arctic run and El Almirante a US ship of Panamanian registry. The convoy sailed from Loch Ewe in Wester Ross, Scotland, an anchorage large enough to accommodate forty ships. The convoy sailed for Hvalfjörður (Hvalfiord) in Iceland on 28 December 1941. Convoys had a standard formation of short columns, number 1 to the left in the direction of travel. (Note: Each position in the column was numbered; 11 was the first ship in column 1 and 12 was the second ship in the column; 21 was the first ship in column 2.)

Ships in column sailed at intervals of 400 yd (370 m) until 1943 when the interval was increased to 600 yd (550 m) then 800 yd (730 m) to cater for inexperienced captains, reluctant to keep so close. Convoy PQ 8 had a close escort of two minesweepers, HMS Harrier (Lieutenant-Commander E. P. Hinton) and Speedwell (Lieutenant-Commander J. J. Youngs) that arrived at Hvalfiord on 1 January 1942 at 8:20 p.m., Brundle being re-appointed convoy commodore for the voyage to Russia. On 11 January, the convoy rendezvoused with the ocean escort comprising the destroyers HMS Matabele and Somali and the cruiser HMS Trinidad (Captain L. S. Saunders).

== Voyage ==
=== 8–16 January ===
Convoy PQ 8 sailed from Hvalfjörður on 8 January 1942 and was joined on the night of 10/11 January in fine weather by the ocean escort, which had sailed from Scapa flow and re-fuelled at Seidisfiord on 9 January. On 12 January the convoy reached 73°45′N 00°00′E and had to turn south to avoid ice; the weather remained calm and visibility was exceptional, with a short period of twilight around noon. Trinidad made several departures from the convoy for training. The Kriegsmarine had established gruppe Ulan, its first Arctic wolfpack, a patrol line consisting of the U-boats U-134 (Rudolf Schendel), U-454 (Burckhard Hacklander) and U-584 (Joachim Deecke), based at Kirkenes, searched for the convoy.

=== 17 January ===
Map of Iceland

In the continuous darkness of the polar night, German reconnaissance aircraft and U-boats failed to find Convoy PQ 8. On 17 January, the convoy was heading south at 8 kn (15 km/h; 9.2 mph) with Harrier ahead, Triinidad off the starboard bow of Harmatris at the head of the third column (position 31) and the destroyers 1 nmi (1.9 km; 1.2 mi) distant on each flank, Speedwell following on behind. Rendezvous with the Murmansk-based minesweepers was made difficult by fog; HMS Britomart and Salamander were stuck in the Kola Inlet but Sharpshooter sailed, followed a while later by Hazard.

The Russian trawler RT-68 Enisej (557 GRT), sailing independently, was attacked at about 6:00 a.m. by U-454 that fired two torpedoes which missed but at 6:32 a.m. a third torpedo sank the boat; two men were killed and 34 survived, their lifeboat reaching the shore. At 7:45 p.m., U-454 found Convoy PQ 8 and fired a torpedo at the merchant ship Harmatris, which exploded in No. 1 hold on the starboard side. Brundle was off the bridge and the First Mate, George Masterman, promptly ordered the ship stopped, to prevent its forward motion from driving the ship under water. The crew was ordered to boat stations; torpedo warheads in No. 1 hold had fallen through the hole in the hull without detonating. From Trinidad it looked as if Harmatris had hit a mine but Matabele reported hearing a torpedo on its hydrophones.

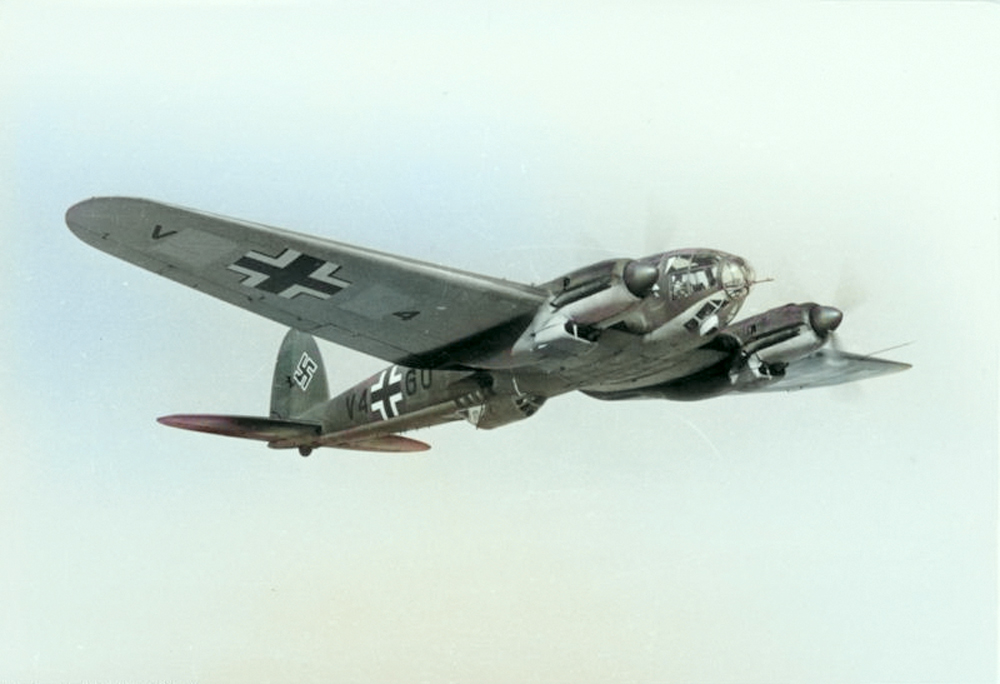
Photograph of a Heinkel He 111

The destroyers conducted an abortive anti-submarine sweep and Speedwell dropped back to stand near the ship. As the rest of the convoy sailed past in line, the vice-commodore on Larranga took over the convoy. An hour later the ship shook and Brundle thought it was a mine explosion but U-454 had manoeuvred round and hit Harmatris on the port side with a torpedo that failed to explode. Speedwell came alongside and took off the crew. During the night, as Harmatris settled at the bow and its propeller rose out of the sea, Brundle thought that Harmatris could be towed and having persuaded Lieutenant-Commander Youngs, the captain of Speedwell, to attempt a tow, asked for volunteers; all of the crew offered to re-board the ship and were promptly transferred. Eventually a cable was passed to Harmatris but the towing sweeps soon snapped. The starboard anchor was found to have been dislodged by the torpedo and was dragging along the seabed 90 fathoms (540 ft; 160 m) below. At 10:00 p.m. Trinidad sent Matabele back to Harmatris as Sharpshooter had arrived from Kola at 9:45 p.m.

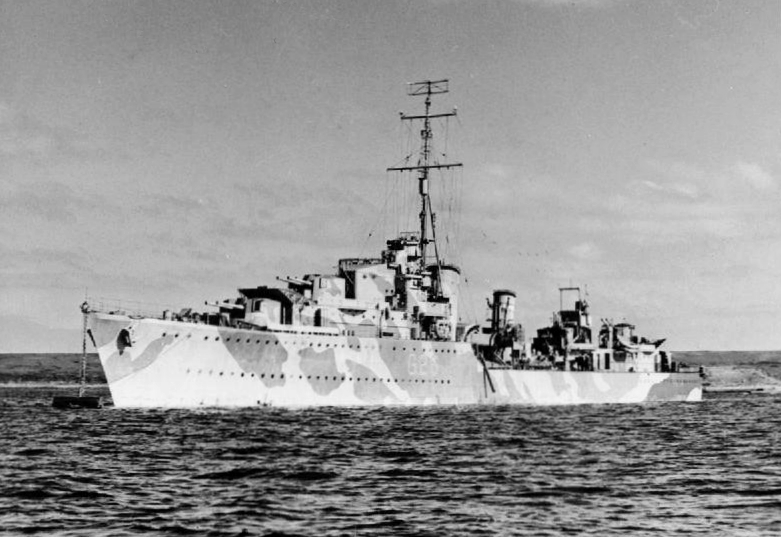
HMS Matabele, sunk on 17 January 1941

U-454 had sailed ahead of the ships and saw the tanker British Pride illuminated by the lighthouse at Cape Teriberskiy and fired a salvo of torpedoes. The torpedoes missed the tanker but one hit Matabele which exploded. Only two men, Ordinary Seamen William Burras and Ernest Higgins survived, the crew being killed in the torpedo explosion, the detonation of its depth charges or of hypothermia in the water. (Note: Higgins had been ordered to close the magazine hatches and then tried to release the Carley floats but they were iced solid and he was told to go forward and close more hatches but the magazine exploded and broke the ship in two. Higgins had to jump into the water amidst many other crewmen, trying to swim away from the wreck before it sank. Some men called for help and others succumbed to the cold but Higgins saw a coiled boarding net; with Burras, Higgins swam for it but the cold made them slip into semi-consciousness. Somali, on the far side of the convoy, increased speed to 20 kn (37 km/h; 23 mph) and crossed the bows of British Pride at the moment that Matabele exploded. Captain Bain, the Senior Escort Commander, realised that Matabele was beyond help and ordered Harrier to the rescue. Many bodies were taken out of the water by the crew of Harrier; Burras and Higgins were pulled from the sea covered in fuel oil, which probably insulated them from the cold. One of the survivors thought that 50 to 60 men had gone into the water.) The convoy scattered, the escorts roving around them until the seven undamaged ships returned to line ahead and resumed course. Somali made a wide circuit 10 nmi (19 km; 12 mi) around the starboard side of the convoy and depth-charged several Asdic contacts. U-454 had descended almost to the sea bed and depth charges from Somali exploded above it without effect.

=== 18–19 January ===
On Harmatris the windlass had been damaged in the explosion and was jammed, the anchor cable would have to be cut by hand. Youngs, on Speedwell, suggested that the crew of Harmatris should return and the crew spent the night on Speedwell, returning at 6:00 a.m. The crew found that the steam pipes had frozen; the steam had been left on, emptying the boilers and work on splitting the anchor cable had to resume by hand. Eventually the cable parted and cables were passed to Harmatris. At 8:00 a.m., Speedwell began the tow. Sharpshooter and Hazard of the Eastern Local Escort had joined the two ships and around noon, about 8 nmi (15 km; 9.2 mi) from Cape Teriberski, as the sky lightened, a He 111 bomber attacked the ships. The Luftflotte 5 had been reinforced and now had 230 aircraft, based at airfields in northern Norway and at Petsamo in Finland.

The Heinkel strafed Harmatris at low altitude but was hit and driven off, trailing smoke, by the anti-aircraft fire of the minesweepers and the eight Defensively equipped merchant ship (DEMS) gunners on board. Brundle tried to fire his Parachute and Cable rockets but they had frozen. A Junkers Ju 88 attacked about an hour later, straddled the ship with bombs, which caused no damage and turned away, also trailing smoke, leaving bullet holes in the superstructure. (At Murmansk, Youngs said that the Heinkel had crashed and that the Russians had credited the two ships with the victory.) At 2:30 p.m. a steam pipe on Speedwell burst, severely injuring three men and Youngs called for a Soviet tug, which arrived quickly, taking over the tow as Speedwell raced for port to get the injured into hospital. Two more tugs arrived at 5:00 p.m. on 19 January.

=== 20 January ===
The Kriegsmarine had planned to attack the convoy with the battleship Tirpitz but lack of fuel and insufficient destroyer escorts, due to them being diverted in support of the Channel Dash, forced a cancellation of the attack. Another two tugs arrived and helped guide Harmatris into Murmansk, down at the bow with its propeller out of the water, at 2:00 p.m. on 20 January. The crew surveyed the ship and found that iron locking bars had been scattered about the deck and wooden hatches and tarpaulins were trapped in the rigging. Much of the interior was waterlogged, number 1 hold being almost full of water and the forward bulkhead had been broken along with the forepeak tank and the fore and aft bulkhead.

== Aftermath ==
=== Analysis ===
While Convoy PQ 8 had sailed to Murmansk, Convoy QP 5 comprising Arcos, Dekabrist, Eulima and San Ambrosio had departed for Iceland on 13 January, escorted by the cruiser HMS Cumberland and the destroyers Icarus and Tartar arriving safely on 24 January. Despite the loss of Matabele, Convoy PQ 8 had been fortunate that a sortie by Tirpitz had been cancelled, due to its destroyer escorts being diverted south for the Channel Dash. The regular sailings to Murmansk and the failure of the German Army to capture the port six months after the start of Operation Barbarossa, made the establishment of a U-boat force in Norway permanent and become a significant part of the anti-shipping effort.

=== Subsequent operations ===
The next convoy, the combined Convoy PQ 9/10 (ten ships) and Convoy PQ 11 (13 ships) slipped past the German defences unscathed but the increasing hours of daylight made further convoys more vulnerable, when it would be another eight to twelve weeks before the pack ice receded. Tovey thought that it was wrong for U-boats to be able to lie in wait off the Kola Inlet. In Tovey's view the Russians should be able to make these waters too dangerous for U-boats and provide fighter cover to convoys as they approached their destination. In February, Rear-Admiral Harold Burrough, commander of the 10th Cruiser Squadron, was dispatched to Murmansk in HMS Nigeria to represent Tovey's views that the Russians should make more effort to defend convoys between Bear Island and the Kola Inlet.

=== Harmatris ===
Harmatris had reached Murmansk but the crew found that it was ill-equipped to handle the number of ships or the quantity of cargo to be unloaded. The two tankers passed highly volatile aviation spirit straight into railway tankers on the jetty, risky in itself and worse during the frequent Luftwaffe air raids on the port. (After Stalingrad Murmansk was the most bombed city of the Soviet Union). Discharge facilities were lacking, despite the development of the port since the First World War. Work began as soon as Harmatris berthed to get the ice out of the steam pipes, which took three days. With steam up, the cargo could be unloaded, which took until 4 February, most of the cargo being undamaged. Two of the fifteen lorries in No. 1 hold were write-offs and 750 long tons (760 t) of sugar was lost. On 5 February the ship was ordered to quay 6, to await dry-docking. The ship had a severe list to starboard but there was little steam to get the ice and snow off the deck, because only sufficient steam pipes to unload had been cleared. To make matters worse, a fire began in the stokehold ashes, which heated the bulkhead of the cadets' room to red hot and caused their wardrobe to burn along with the cadets' clothes, two hours' work being needed to put out the fire. Harmatris went into dry-dock on 10 February, down 21 ft (6.4 m) at the head and up 11 ft (3.4 m) at the stern.

There was a hole about 60 by 30 ft (18.3 by 9.1 m) on the starboard side, the No. 1 ballast tank had been destroyed and the bulkheads were damaged. On the port side there was a big bulge about 14 ft (4.3 m) wide, rivets had popped and the decks and other parts of the superstructure were severely damaged. The engine room needed repairs but it was exceedingly difficult to find spare parts or obtain labour because of the shortage. The Captain sent groups of crewmembers to cadge spares from other ships but the shortages and the intense cold stopped work, then Brundle was told that Harmatris was being evicted from the dry dock to make room for a destroyer. The Senior British Naval Officer, Rear-Admiral Richard Bevan, overruled Brundle's objections and on 14 March Harmatris was moved to a coal dock near Vaenga, about 4 mi (6.4 km) from Murmansk. No help was forthcoming from the Russian authorities and the engineers in the crew offered to continue the repair work provided the employer paid overtime. Since the U-boat attack, No. 2 hold had been taking on water which would add to the ship's list; Brundle spent much time telephoning British and Russian agencies to find an electric pump and had to be talked out of writing to Stalin in despair. The ship owners in Britain were informed, who promised help and some Russian labour was provided in the form of 16–18-year-old girls.

Murmansk received about three raids a day from the Luftwaffe, whose bases were five minutes' flying time away. A ship was sunk on the night of 3/4 April and one nearby was bombed and set on fire, its cargo being unloaded between air raids and between fire-fighting, then the ship was sunk on 16 June. On 14 April another ship was sunk. Many of the sinkings were from Convoy PQ 13, two were from were from Convoy PQ 15 and Alcoa Cadet was sunk by an internal explosion; Steel Worker was blown up on a mine. The crew of Harmatris decided to work at night and sleep by day onshore. While at Murmansk the dock was attacked thirty times, Harmatris being rained with bomb splinters and shuddering from nearby bomb explosions. There was an acute food shortage, adults being rationed to 11 oz (300 g) and crew from Harmatris rowed out to ships sunk in shallow water to recover tinned food; a ship from the parent company brought more food. Harmatris sailed for Arkhangelsk on 21 July, a 400 nmi (740 km; 460 mi) journey completed on 24 July. On 26 July the ship moved to Ekonomiya to discharge ballast and took on 3,000 long tons (3,000 t) of steel pipe at Myrmaxa. There was a food shortage at Arkhangelsk and the merchant captains kept in touch to make sure that the crews got their share when food appeared. The port was less frequently bombed than Murmansk and was a gathering point for about survivors, including 141 from Convoy PQ 17. By September Harmatris had taken on twenty survivors and 200 long tons (200 t) of dubious quality coal, ready to sail for Britain, departing on 13 September in Convoy QP 14.

== British order of battle ==
=== Merchant ships ===
Merchantmen (Note: Convoys had a standard formation of short columns, number 1 to port in the direction of travel. Each position in the column was numbered; 11 was the first ship in column 1 and 12 was the second ship in the column; 21 was the first ship in column 2.)
Ship	Year	Flag	GRT	P'n	Notes
SS British Pride	1931	United Kingdom	7,106	22	Tanker, arrived on 17 January
SS British Workman	1922	United Kingdom	6,994	32	Tanker, arrived on 17 January
SS Dartford	1930	United Kingdom	4,093	12	Arrived on 17 January
SS El Almirante	1917	Panama	5,248	11	Arrived on 17 January
SS Harmatris	1932	United Kingdom	5,395	31	Convoy Commodore; torpedoed, 20 January, on tow
SS Larranga	1917	United States	3,804	21	Vice-Convoy Commodore, arrived 17 January
SS Southgate	1926	United Kingdom	4,862	41	Arrived on 17 January
MV Stary Bolshevik	1933	Soviet Union	3,974	42	Arrived on 17 January

=== Convoy formation ===
Convoy sailing order (Note: Convoys had a standard formation of short columns, number 1 to the left in the direction of travel. Each position in the column was numbered; 11 was the first ship in column 1 and 12 was the second ship in the column; 21 was the first ship in column 2.)
column 1	column 2	column 3	column 4
11 El Almitante	21 Larranga	31 Harmatris	41 Southgate
12 Dartford	22 British Pride	32 British Workman	42 Stary Bolshevik

=== Convoy escorts ===
Convoy escorts
Ship	Flag	Type	Notes
Iceland local escort
HMS Harrier	Royal Navy	Halcyon-class minesweeper	8–17 January
HMS Speedwell	Royal Navy	Halcyon-class minesweeper	8–17 January
Ocean escort
HMS Trinidad	Royal Navy	Fiji-class cruiser	11–17 January
HMS Matabele	Royal Navy	Tribal-class destroyer	11–17 January, sunk U-454, 69°21'N, 35°34'E, 236† 2 surv
HMS Somali	Royal Navy	Tribal-class destroyer	11–17 January
Eastern local escort
HMS Hazard	Royal Navy	Halcyon-class minesweeper	16–17 January
HMS Sharpshooter	Royal Navy	Halcyon-class minesweeper	16–17 January

== German order of battle ==
=== U-boats ===
gruppe Ulan (25 December 1941 – 19 January 1942)
Boat	Flag	Class	Notes
U-134	Kriegsmarine	Type VIIC submarine	
U-454	Kriegsmarine	Type VIIC submarine	17 October, sank trawler RT-68 Enisej, HMS Matabele, damaged Harmatris
U-584	Kriegsmarine	Type VIIC submarine	

== Bibliography ==
- Blair, Clay (1996). Hitler's U-Boat War. Vol. I. New York: Random House. ISBN 0-304-35260-8.
- Brown, David (1995) [1990]. Warship Losses of World War Two (2nd rev. ed.). London: Arms and Armour Press. ISBN 978-1-85409-278-6.
- Boog, H.; Rahn, W.; Stumpf, R.; Wegner, B. (2001). The Global War: Widening of the Conflict into a World War and the Shift of the Initiative 1941–1943. Germany in the Second World War. Vol. VI. Translated by Osers, E.; Brownjohn, J.; Crampton, P.; Willmot, L. (Eng trans. Oxford University Press, London ed.). Potsdam: Militärgeschichtliches Forschungsamt (Research Institute for Military History). ISBN 0-19-822888-0.
  - Rahn, W. "Part III, the War at Sea in the Atlantic and in the Arctic Ocean. III. The Conduct of the War in the Atlantic and the Coastal Area (b) The Third Phase, April–December 1941: The Extension of the Areas of Operations". In Boog et al. (2001).
- Budiansky, S. (2000). Battle of Wits: The Complete Story of Codebreaking in World War II. New York: The Free Press (Simon & Schuster). ISBN 0-684-85932-7 – via Archive Foundation.
- Butler, J. R. M. (1964). Grand Strategy: June 1941 – August 1942 (Part II). History of the Second World War, United Kingdom Military Series. Vol. III. London: HMSO. OCLC 504770038.
- Claasen, A. R. A. (2001). Hitler's Northern War: The Luftwaffe's Ill-fated Campaign, 1940–1945. Lawrence, KS: University Press of Kansas. ISBN 0-7006-1050-2.
- Garzke, William H.; Dulin, Robert O. (1985). Battleships: Axis and Neutral Battleships in World War II. Annapolis, Maryland: Naval Institute Press. ISBN 978-0-87021-101-0.
- Hague, Arnold (2000). The Allied Convoy System, 1939–1945: Its Organization, Defence and Operation. Annapolis, MD: Naval Institute Press. ISBN 978-1-55750-019-9.
- Hancock, W. K.; Gowing, M. M. (1949). Hancock, W. K. (ed.). British War Economy. History of the Second World War, United Kingdom Civil Series. London: HMSO. OCLC 630191560.
- Hinsley, F. H. (1994) [1993]. British Intelligence in the Second World War: Its Influence on Strategy and Operations. History of the Second World War, United Kingdom Military Series (2nd rev. abr. ed.). London: HMSO. ISBN 978-0-11-630961-7.
- Howard, M. (1972). Grand Strategy: August 1942 – September 1943. History of the Second World War United Kingdom Military Series. Vol. IV. London: HMSO. ISBN 978-0-11-630075-1 – via Archive Foundation.
- Kahn, D. (1973) [1967]. The Codebreakers: The Story of Secret Writing (10th abr. Signet, Chicago ed.). New York: Macmillan. LCCN 63-16109. OCLC 78083316.
- Macksey, K. (2004) [2003]. The Searchers: Radio Intercept in two World Wars (Cassell Military Paperbacks ed.). London: Cassell. ISBN 978-0-304-36651-4.
- Paterson, Lawrence (2016). Steel and Ice: The U-Boat Battle in the Arctic and Black Sea 1941–45. Stroud: The History Press. ISBN 978-1-59114-258-4.
- Rohwer, Jürgen; Hümmelchen, Gerhard (2005) [1972]. Chronology of the War at Sea, 1939–1945: The Naval History of World War Two (3rd rev. ed.). London: Chatham. ISBN 978-1-86176-257-3.
- Roskill, S. W. (1957) [1954]. Butler, J. R. M. (ed.). The War at Sea 1939–1945: The Defensive. History of the Second World War United Kingdom Military Series. Vol. I (4th impr. ed.). London: HMSO. OCLC 881709135. Archived from the original on 27 February 2022.
- Roskill, S. W. (1962) [1957]. Butler, J. R. M. (ed.). The War at Sea 1939–1945: The Period of Balance. History of the Second World War. Vol. II (3rd impr. ed.). London: HMSO. OCLC 174453986 – via Hyperwar.
- Roskill, S. W. (2004) [1961]. The War at Sea 1939–1945: The Offensive Part II 1st June 1944 – 14th August 1945. History of the Second World War. Vol. III (facs. repr. Naval and Military Press, Uckfield ed.). London: HMSO. ISBN 978-1-84342-806-0.
- Ruegg, R.; Hague, A. (1993) [1992]. Convoys to Russia: Allied Convoys and Naval Surface Operations in Arctic Waters 1941–1945 (2nd rev. enl. ed.). Kendal: World Ship Society. ISBN 0-905617-66-5.
- Wadsworth, M. (2009). Arctic Convoy PQ 8: The Story of Capt Robert Brundle and the SS Harmatris. Barnsley: Pen & Sword Maritime. ISBN 978-1-84884-051-5.
- Woodman, Richard (2004) [1994]. Arctic Convoys 1941–1945. London: John Murray. ISBN 978-0-7195-5752-1.
- Ziemke, Earl F. (1959). The German Northern Theatre of Operations 1940–1945. Department of the Army pamphlets (20-271). Washington, DC: Department of the Army. OCLC 467919261.
