= HMS Punjabi =

Destroyer of the Royal Navy

Coordinates: 66°0′N 8°0′W

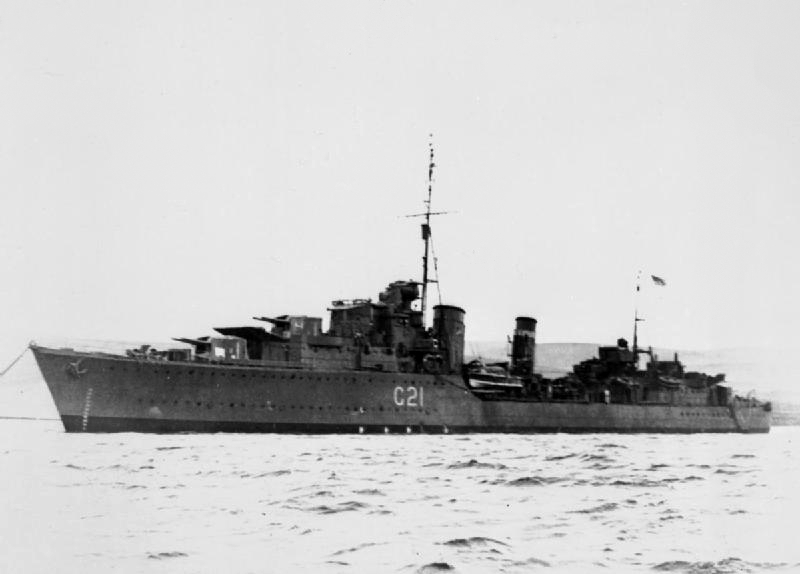
- Punjabi at anchor

History

United Kingdom
- Name: Punjabi
- Namesake: Punjabis
- Ordered: 19 June 1936
- Builder: Scotts Shipbuilding & Engineering, Greenock
- Laid down: 1 October 1936
- Launched: 18 December 1937
- Commissioned: 29 March 1939
- Identification: Pennant numbers: L21, later F21
- Fate: Sunk in a collision with King George V, 1 May 1942

General characteristics (as built)
- Class & type: Tribal-class destroyer
- Displacement: 1,891 long tons (1,921 t) (standard)
- Length: 377 ft (114.9 m) (o/a)
- Beam: 36 ft 6 in (11.13 m)
- Draught: 11 ft 3 in (3.43 m)
- Installed power: 3 × Admiralty 3-drum boilers; 44,000 shp (33,000 kW)
- Propulsion: 2 × shafts; 2 × geared steam turbines
- Speed: 36 knots (67 km/h; 41 mph)
- Range: 5,700 nmi (10,600 km; 6,600 mi) at 15 knots (28 km/h; 17 mph)
- Complement: 190
- Sensors & processing systems: ASDIC
- Armament: 4 × twin 4.7 in (120 mm) guns; 1 × quadruple 2 pdr (40 mm (1.6 in)) AA guns; 2 × quadruple 0.5 in (12.7 mm) anti-aircraft machineguns; 1 × quadruple 21 in (533 mm) torpedo tubes; 1 × depth charge rack, 2 × throwers, 20 × depth charges

HMS Punjabi was a Tribal-class destroyer built for the Royal Navy (RN) during the 1930s. Completed in 1939, she served in the Second World War until she was sunk in a collision with the battleship King George V in 1942. She has been the only ship of the Royal Navy to bear the name "Punjabi" which, in common with the other ships of the Tribal class, was named after various ethnic groups of the world, mainly those of the British Empire.

== Description ==
The Tribals were intended to counter the large destroyers being built abroad and to improve the firepower of the existing destroyer flotillas and were thus significantly larger and more heavily armed than the preceding I class. The ships displaced 1,891 long tons (1,921 t) at standard load and 2,519 long tons (2,559 t) at deep load. They had an overall length of 377 feet (114.9 m), a beam of 36 feet 6 inches (11.13 m) and a draught of 11 feet 3 inches (3.43 m). The destroyers were powered by two Parsons geared steam turbines, each driving one propeller shaft using steam provided by three Admiralty three-drum boilers.

The turbines developed a total of 44,000 shaft horsepower (33,000 kW) and gave a maximum speed of 36 knots (67 km/h; 41 mph). During her sea trials Punjabi made 36.0 knots (66.7 km/h; 41.4 mph) from 44,549 shp (33,220 kW) at a displacement of 1,990 long tons (2,020 t). The ships carried enough fuel oil to give them a range of 5,700 nautical miles (10,600 km; 6,600 mi) at 15 knots (28 km/h; 17 mph). The ships' complement consisted of 190 officers and ratings, although the flotilla leaders carried an extra 20 officers and men consisting of the Captain (D) and his staff.

The primary armament of the Tribal-class destroyers was eight quick-firing (QF) 4.7-inch (120 mm) Mark XII guns in four superfiring twin-gun mounts, one pair each fore and aft of the superstructure, designated 'A', 'B', 'X', and 'Y' from front to rear. The mounts had a maximum elevation of 40°. For anti-aircraft (AA) defence, they carried a single quadruple mount for the 40-millimetre (1.6 in) QF two-pounder Mk II "pom-pom" gun and two quadruple mounts for the 0.5-inch (12.7 mm) Mark III machine gun.

Low-angle fire for the main guns was controlled by the director-control tower (DCT) on the bridge roof that fed data from it and the 12-foot (3.7 m) rangefinder on the Mk II Rangefinder/Director aft of the DCT to an analogue mechanical computer, the Mk I Admiralty Fire Control Clock. Anti-aircraft fire for the main guns was controlled by the Rangefinder/Director which sent data to the mechanical Fuze Keeping Clock. The ships were fitted with a quadruple deck-mounted 21-inch (533 mm) launcher. Although not anti-submarine ships, they had ASDIC, one depth charge rack and two throwers, though throwers were not mounted in all ships. The twenty depth charges were increased to 30 during wartime.

=== Wartime modifications ===
Many losses to German air attack during the Norwegian Campaign demonstrated the ineffectiveness of the Tribals' anti-aircraft suite and the Navy decided in May 1940 to replace 'X' mount with two QF 4-inch (102 mm) Mark XVI dual-purpose guns in a twin-gun mount. To better control the guns, the rangefinder/director was modified to accept a Type 285 gunnery radar as they became available. The number of depth charges was increased to 46 early in the war and more were added later. To increase the firing arcs of the AA guns, the rear funnel was shortened and the mainmast was reduced to a short pole mast.

== Construction and career ==
Authorized as one of nine Tribal-class destroyers under the 1936 Naval Estimates, Punjabi has been the first and only ship of her name to serve in the Royal Navy. The ship was ordered on 19 June 1936 from Scotts Shipbuilding & Engineering and was laid down on 9 June at the company's Greenock shipyard. Launched on 1 October 1936, Punjabi was commissioned on 29 March 1939 at a cost of £342,005 which excluded weapons and communications outfits furnished by the Admiralty.

Punjabi was commissioned for service in the 2nd Tribal Destroyer Flotilla in the Home Fleet, which was redesignated at the 6th Destroyer Flotilla in April 1939. While on work-up trials, she was redirected to aid in search and rescue attempts for the submarine Thetis, which had sunk in Liverpool Bay. She then rejoined the Home Fleet on exercises.

=== World War II ===
On the outbreak of war in September, Punjabi deployed with the Flotilla for Home Fleet duties including anti-submarine patrols and convoy defence in the North Western Approaches and the North Sea. In October, she made an unsuccessful attempt to salvage a crashed German flying boat. On 2 December, she sustained structural damage to her bows when she collided with the merchant vessel Lairdscrest south of Holy Island. She was under repair at Alexander Stephen and Sons' shipyard in Govan from 15 December to late February, when she rejoined the flotilla. She was then based at Scapa Flow on screening and patrol duties.

In April she made a number of deployments with the Home Fleet to search for German warships in the North Sea and off the Norwegian coast. On 8 April, she screened the battleships coming to assist the destroyer Glowworm, which was under attack by the German cruiser Admiral Hipper. Glowworm eventually rammed Admiral Hipper, before sinking. Punjabi was then deployed off Narvik as a screen for operations during the Second Battle of Narvik. On 13 April, she engaged a number of German destroyers, receiving six hits and being disabled for an hour before she could resume service. She was temporarily repaired at Skelfjord before returning to Devonport Dockyard for more thorough repairs. Her 4.7 in (120 mm) mounting in "X" position was replaced with a twin 4 in (100 mm) anti-aircraft mounting.

On returning to active service in June she was based at Plymouth. On 17 June, she took part in the evacuation of allied military and civil personnel from Saint-Nazaire. She returned again on 20 June to evacuate Polish troops. On 9 August, she deployed with other Home Fleet destroyers in escorting the capital ships of Force H from Gibraltar. In September, Punjabi screened the military convoys for Operation Menace, the attacks on Dakar on their passage through the North Western Approaches. She also escorted the damaged cruiser Fiji back to the UK after she had been torpedoed and damaged off the Hebrides. The rest of the year was spent on deployments with the Flotilla. On 23 October, Matabele, Punjabi and Somali shelled and sank the weather ship WBS 5 Adolf Vinnen in the Norwegian Sea off Stadlandet, Norway.

In February 1941, Punjabi returned to Scapa Flow with the Flotilla, before undergoing a refit at Rosyth in March–April. The work included the fitting of a RAF ASV type radar outfit modified for shipborne use. At the end of May, she was part of the escort for capital ships of the Home Fleet hunting for the German battleship Bismarck after the sinking of the battlecruiser Hood. On 27 July, she and Tartar escorted the cruisers Aurora and Nigeria to assess the potential of using Spitsbergen as a refuelling base for escorts used in the defence of convoys on passage to and from North Russia.

=== Arctic Ocean ===
On 1 August, Punjabi and Tartar evacuated Norwegian nationals from Bear Island and carried out an offensive sweep off the Norwegian coast before returning to Scapa Flow. On 30 August, Punjabi, Matabele and Somali escorted the aircraft carrier Argus and the cruiser Shropshire during an operation to supply the Soviet Union with Hawker Hurricanes and RAF personnel. She then resumed normal flotilla duties before beginning a refit in December at Hawthorn Leslie and Company's yards at Newcastle upon Tyne. The refit lasted until the end of January 1942 and involved repairing damage to machines and systems due to excess stress when steaming in heavy weather.

In March, she joined other Home Fleet units in providing cover for convoys PQ 12 and the returning QP 8. During these operations, it was believed that the German battleship Tirpitz had put to sea to intercept the convoys. Punjabi was one of the ships tasked with supporting the search for her, but Tirpitz had in fact returned to port. Punjabi was detached from the search on 11 March and returned to Scapa Flow after encountering problems with her steering gear. In April, she escorted Convoy PQ 10 back to the UK. On 12 April, she came under attack from U-453, but the attack was unsuccessful. She escorted Convoy PQ 10 to Iceland and was detached from the convoy on its arrival there on 21 April.

== Sinking ==
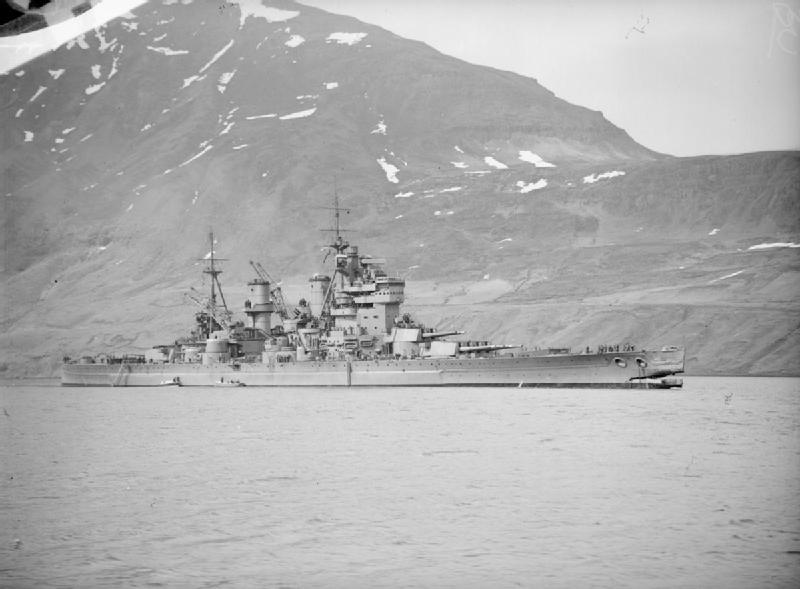
King George V, photographed with a huge hole in the bows after she had collided with Punjabi in dense fog on 1 May 1942

Punjabi was deployed on 26 April as part of the screen providing distant cover for the passage of Convoy PQ 15. They sailed from Hvalfjörður on 29 April. On 1 May, she was rammed and sunk in a collision with the battleship HMS King George V in foggy conditions. While steaming in formation in heavy fog, the lookout on Punjabi reported what he believed to be a mine dead ahead; the captain reflexively ordered a 15-point emergency turn to port; in so doing, she sailed directly into the path of King George V and was sliced in two by the battleship's bow.

169 of the ship's company were rescued from the forward section, and another 40 were picked up from the sea by other escorts, including Marne. Those crew left in the aft section, which sank very quickly, were killed when her depth charges detonated; 49 of her crew lost their lives in the accident.

She sank directly in the path of the US battleship USS Washington, which had to sail between the halves of the sinking destroyer. Washington suffered slight damage from the detonation of the depth charges. King George V sustained serious damage to her bow, and was forced to return to port for repairs.

Further investigation revealed no mines in the area, or indeed in any part of the convoy's eventual path. It is unknown what the lookout actually spotted, if anything.
