= German weather ship WBS 5 Adolf Vinnen =

Ship built in 1929

History

Germany
- Name: Gustav Adolf Kühling (1929–30); Adolf Vinnen (1930–40)
- Owner: Hochseefisherei J Wieting AG (1929–35); Deutsche Hochseefisherei Bremen-Cuxhaven AG (1935–40); Kriegsmarine (1940)
- Operator: Deutsche Hochseefisherei Bremen-Cuxhaven AG (1929–40); Kriegsmarine (1940)
- Port of registry: (Weimar Republic) Bremerhaven, Germany (1929–30); (Weimar Republic) Nordenham, Germany (1930–35); (Nazi Germany) Wesermünde, Germany (1935–39); Kriegsmarine (1939–40)
- Builder: Deutsche Schiff- und Maschinenbau
- Yard number: 498
- Launched: June 1929
- Completed: 7 October 1929
- Commissioned: 1 March 1940
- Out of service: 23 October 1940
- Identification: Code Letters QVNK (1929–34); Code Letters DNOQ (1934–39); Fishing registrations BX 208 (1929–30), ON 141 (1930–34), PG 478 (1934–40); Kriegsmarine identifier WBS 5 (1940)
- Fate: Sunk by HMS Matabele, HMS Punjabi and HMS Somali, 23 October 1940

General characteristics
- Class & type: Fishing vessel (1929–40); Weather ship (1940)
- Tonnage: 391 GRT, 149 NRT, 421 DWT
- Length: 45.31 metres (148 ft 8 in)
- Beam: 7.69 metres (25 ft 3 in)
- Draught: 3.81 metres (12 ft 6 in)
- Depth: 3.96 metres (13 ft 0 in)
- Installed power: Triple expansion steam engine, 65 nhp
- Propulsion: Single screw propeller
- Speed: 10.9 knots (20.2 km/h)

Location where Adolf Vinnen was sunk

Adolf Vinnen was a weather ship that was built in 1929 as the fishing vessel Gustav Adolf Kühling. She was renamed in 1930. The ship was requisitioned by the Kriegsmarine in March 1940, serving until 23 October 1940 when she was sunk by HMS Matabele, HMS Punjabi and HMS Somali.

== Description ==
The ship was 45.31 metres (148 ft 8 in) long, with a beam of 7.69 metres (25 ft 3 in). She had a depth of 3.96 metres (13 ft 0 in), and a draught of 3.81 metres (12 ft 6 in). She was powered by a triple expansion steam engine rated at 65 nhp. The engine was built by Deutsche Schiff- und Maschinenbau (Deschimag), Wesermünde. It drove a single screw propeller, which could propel the ship at 10.9 knots (20.2 km/h). She was assessed at 391 GRT, 149 NRT, 421 DWT.

== History ==
Gustav Adolf Kühling was built by Deschimag as yard number 498 in 1929 for the Hochseefisherei J Wieting AG, Wesermünde. Launched in June 1929, she completed her sea trials on 7 October and was delivered the next day. Her port of registry was Bremerhaven. The Code Letters QVNK and fishing registration BX 208 were allocated. She was operated under the management of the Deutsche Hochseefisherei Bremen-Cuxhaven AG. On 16 June 1930, she was sold to the Deutsche Hochseefischerei Bremen-Cuxhaven AG. Her port of registry was changed to Nordenham and the fishing registration ON 141 was allocated. On 24 October, she was renamed Adolf Vinnen.

With the change of Code Letters on 1 January 1934, she was allocated the letters DNOQ. On 4 September, her port of registry was changed to Wesermünde and the fishing registration PG 478 was allocated. On 17 October, she was sold to the Deutsche Hochseefisherei Bremen-Cuxhaven AG.

In 1940, Adolf Vinnen was requisitioned by the Kriegsmarine and converted to a weather ship. She had a crew of fifteen, plus her meteorologists. She was commissioned on 1 March. From 1 March to mid-April, she operated in the Denmark Strait in support of the auxiliary cruiser Atlantis, which was to escape into the Atlantic Ocean. Weather ships WBS 3 Fritz Homann and WBS 4 Hinrich Freese also supplied Atlantis with weather reports. She arrived at Bergen, Norway on 14 April. On 1 May, she was ordered to Hardangerfjord to supply coal to Kvitsøy, which had been impressed into German service as a troop transport. On 2 May, she was ordered to assist in the recovery of material from Cläre Hugo Stinnes 1, which had been attacked by HMS Trident and had been beached in Korsfjord.

On 5 May 1940, she sailed from Bergen disguised as a Belgian vessel. Her destination was an area north east of Iceland where she was to operate in support of the auxiliary cruiser Widder. Her first weather report was sent on 10 May. She was relieved on 25 May by Hinrich Freese. On 4 June, she collided with an iceberg. As she had not been overhauled for over a year, it was decided that she would return to Germany for repairs, which would take three weeks to perform. She sailed from Bergen in a convoy of five ships on 9 June, bound for Kristiansand. Following repairs, she returned to Bergen on 14 July. Adolf Vinnen sailed two days later to relieve Fritz Homann east of Iceland. On 18 July, it was decided that the three weather ships were to be withdrawn, but the order was rescinded the next day. On 22 July, she departed from Bergen to operate north of Jan Mayen, Norway in support of the cruisers Admiral Hipper and Admiral Scheer. She was relieved on 18 August by Hinrich Freese.

Adolf Vinnen was then placed under repair at Bergen, with U-29 having priority over her. She departed from Bergen on 22 September to operate north of Iceland. She was recalled after four weeks and headed back to Norway. On 23 October 1940, Adolf Vinnen was shelled and sunk in the Norwegian Sea off Stadlandet, Norway (62°29′N 4°23′E) by HMS Matabele, HMS Punjabi and HMS Somali. Six of her crew were killed and seven survivors took to the life raft. Two of them had died by the time they were rescued on 25 October by the Norwegian trawler Odin 50 nautical miles (93 km) west of Stadlandet.
