= SS Almeria Lykes (1940) =

1940 U.S. cargo ship

Coordinates: 36°40′N 11°35′E

History
- Name: Almeria Lykes (1940–41); Empire Condor (1941–42); Almeria Lykes (1942)
- Owner: United States Maritime Commission (1940–41); Ministry of War Transport (1941–42); United States Maritime Commission (1942)
- Operator: Lykes Brothers Steamship Co (1940–41); Donaldson, Brothers & Black Ltd (1941–42); Lykes Brothers Steamship Co (1942)
- Port of registry: (United States) Galveston (1940–41); (United Kingdom) London (1941–41); (United States) Galveston (1942)
- Builder: Federal Shipbuilding and Drydock Company
- Launched: 1940
- Out of service: 13 August 1942
- Identification: Code Letters WFJX (1940–41); Code Letters BCJN (1941–42); Code Letters WFJY (1942); United States Official Number 239664 (1940–41, 1942); United Kingdom Official Number 168167 (1941–42)
- Fate: Torpedoed and later scuttled

General characteristics
- Class & type: Type C3 ship
- Tonnage: 7,773 GRT; 4,585 NRT
- Length: 469 ft 0 in (142.95 m)
- Beam: 69 ft 6 in (21.18 m)
- Depth: 29 ft 2 in (8.89 m)
- Installed power: 2 x steam turbines
- Propulsion: Screw propeller
- Crew: 105, including United States Navy Armed Guard members (Almeria Lykes, 1942)

Location of the sinking of Almeria Lykes off Tunisia.

Almeria Lykes was a 7,773 GRT Type C3 cargo ship that was built in 1940 by Federal Shipbuilding and Drydock Company, Kearny, New Jersey for the Lykes Brother Steamship Co. She was transferred to the Ministry of War Transport (MoWT) and renamed Empire Condor. In 1942, she was transferred to the United States Maritime Commission (USMC) and renamed Almeria Lykes. She was torpedoed by Axis motor torpedo boats on 13 August 1942 and later scuttled.

== Description ==
The ship was built in 1940 by Federal Shipbuilding and Drydock Company, Kearney, New Jersey.

The ship was 469 feet 0 inches (142.95 m) long, with a beam of 69 feet 6 inches (21.18 m) a depth of 29 feet 2 inches (8.89 m). She had a GRT of 7,773 and a NRT of 4,585.

She was propelled by two steam turbines, double reduction geared, driving a single screw propeller. The turbines were built by DeLaval Steam Turbine Company, Trenton, New Jersey.

== History ==
Almeria Lykes was a Type C3 ship built for the USMC. She was placed under the management of the Lykes Brothers Steamship Co. Her port of registry was Galveston, Texas. The Code Letters WFJX were allocated. She was also allocated the United States Official Number 239664.

In 1941, Almeria Lykes was transferred to the MoWT and renamed Empire Condor. She was placed under the management of Donaldson, Brothers & Black Ltd. Her port of registry was changed to London. The Code Letters BCJN and United Kingdom Official Number 168167 were allocated. On 3 June 1941, Empire Condor departed the United Kingdom as part of Convoy WS 9A, which assembled off Oversay, the ship departing from Avonmouth or Liverpool. The convoy arrived at Freetown, Sierra Leone on 18 June. It departed Freetown on 20 June and arrived at Durban, South Africa on 4 July. The convoy departed Durban on 8 July and dispersed of Aden on 21 July, its ships then proceeding independently to Suez, Egypt.

In 1942, Empire Condor was transferred back to the USMC. She was renamed Almeria Lykes and placed under the management of the Lykes Steamship Co. Her port of registry was changed to Galveston. The Code Letters WFJY were allocated and she regained her United States Official Number 239664. On 31 May 1942, Almeria Lykes departed Halifax, Nova Scotia as part of Convoy HX 192. the convoy arrived at Liverpool on 11 June. Almeria Lykes was carrying general cargo.

On 2 August 1942, Almeria Lykes departed from the Clyde as part of Convoy WS 21S. Passing Gibraltar on 10 August, the convoy became Operation Pedestal, consisting of 14 merchant ships escorted by a total of 23 warships at various times from 2 August. On 12 August, gunners on board Almeria Lykes shot down two enemy aircraft. Also on that day, an unexploded torpedo mine was caught on the bridge of Almeria Lykes. It was safely deposited into the sea. On 13 August, Almeria Lykes was torpedoed at 3:14 AM by German E boat S-36 and later, at 3:40 AM, by Italian MAS 554 off Kelibia, Tunisia. She had been under attack for 60 hours. Almeria Lykes was badly damaged, and was scuttled to prevent her capture. During this period, gunners on board Almeria Lykes sank an E boat. All 105 crew, which included Naval Armed Guard members, were rescued by HMS Somali and landed at Gibraltar.

The ship was depicted on a Maltese postage stamp that was issued on 10 August 2012 commemorating the 70th anniversary of Operation Pedestal.
