= HMS Matabele =

Destroyer of the Royal Navy

Coordinates: 69°21′N 35°27′E

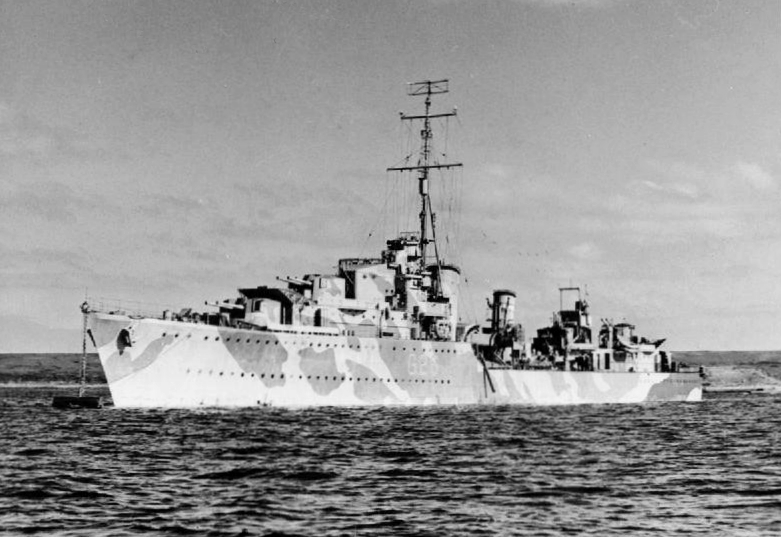
- Matabele

History

United Kingdom
- Name: Matabele
- Namesake: Southern Ndebele people
- Ordered: 19 June 1936
- Builder: Scotts Shipbuilding & Engineering, Greenock
- Cost: £342,005
- Laid down: 1 October 1936
- Launched: 6 October 1937
- Completed: 25 January 1939
- Identification: Pennant numbers: L26, later F26
- Motto: Hamba Gahle: " Go in Peace."
- Fate: Sunk, 17 January 1942

General characteristics (as built)
- Class & type: Tribal-class destroyer
- Displacement: 1,891 long tons (1,921 t) (standard); 2,519 long tons (2,559 t) (deep load)
- Length: 377 ft (114.9 m) (o/a)
- Beam: 36 ft 6 in (11.13 m)
- Draught: 11 ft 3 in (3.43 m)
- Installed power: 3 × Admiralty 3-drum boilers; 44,000 shp (33,000 kW)
- Propulsion: 2 × shafts; 2 × geared steam turbines
- Speed: 36 knots (67 km/h; 41 mph)
- Range: 5,700 nmi (10,600 km; 6,600 mi) at 15 knots (28 km/h; 17 mph)
- Complement: 190
- Sensors & processing systems: ASDIC
- Armament: 4 × twin 4.7 in (120 mm) guns; 1 × quadruple 2-pdr (40 mm (1.6 in)) AA guns; 2 × quadruple 0.5 in (12.7 mm) anti-aircraft machineguns; 1 × quadruple 21 in (533 mm) torpedo tubes; 20 × depth charges, 1 × rack, 2 × throwers

HMS Matabele was a Tribal-class destroyer of the Royal Navy that saw service in World War II, being sunk by a U-boat on 17 January 1942. She has been the only ship of the Royal Navy to bear the name Matabele, which in common with the other ships of the Tribal class, was named after an ethnic group of the British Empire. In this case, this was the Anglicisation of the Ndebele people of Zimbabwe.

== Description ==
The Tribals were intended to counter the large destroyers being built abroad and to improve the firepower of the existing destroyer flotillas and were thus significantly larger and more heavily armed than the preceding I class. The ships displaced 1,891 long tons (1,921 t) at standard load and 2,519 long tons (2,559 t) at deep load. They had an overall length of 377 feet (114.9 m), a beam of 36 feet 6 inches (11.13 m) and a draught of 11 feet 3 inches (3.43 m). The destroyers were powered by two Parsons geared steam turbines, each driving one propeller shaft using steam provided by three Admiralty three-drum boilers. The turbines developed a total of 44,000 shaft horsepower (33,000 kW) and gave a maximum speed of 36 knots (67 km/h; 41 mph). During her sea trials Matabele made 36.8 knots (68.2 km/h; 42.3 mph) from 44,299 shp (33,034 kW) at a displacement of 1,964 long tons (1,996 t). The ships carried enough fuel oil to give them a range of 5,700 nautical miles (10,600 km; 6,600 mi) at 15 knots (28 km/h; 17 mph). The ships' complement consisted of 190 officers and ratings, although the flotilla leaders carried an extra 20 officers and men consisting of the Captain (D) and his staff.

The primary armament of the Tribal-class destroyers was eight quick-firing (QF) 4.7-inch (120 mm) Mark XII guns in four superfiring twin-gun mounts, one pair each fore and aft of the superstructure, designated 'A', 'B', 'X', and 'Y' from front to rear. The mounts had a maximum elevation of 40°. For anti-aircraft (AA) defence, they carried a single quadruple mount for the 40-millimetre (1.6 in) QF two-pounder Mk II "pom-pom" gun and two quadruple mounts for the 0.5-inch (12.7 mm) Mark III machine gun. Low-angle fire for the main guns was controlled by the director-control tower (DCT) on the bridge roof that fed data acquired by it and the 12-foot (3.7 m) rangefinder on the Mk II Rangefinder/Director directly aft of the DCT to an analogue mechanical computer, the Mk I Admiralty Fire Control Clock. Anti-aircraft fire for the main guns was controlled by the Rangefinder/Director which sent data to the mechanical Fuze Keeping Clock.

The ships were fitted with a single above-water quadruple mount for 21-inch (533 mm) torpedoes. The Tribals were not intended as anti-submarine ships, but they were provided with ASDIC, one depth charge rack and two throwers for self-defence, although the throwers were not mounted in all ships; Twenty depth charges was the peacetime allotment, but this increased to 30 during wartime.

=== Wartime modifications ===
Heavy losses to German air attack during the Norwegian Campaign demonstrated the ineffectiveness of the Tribals' anti-aircraft suite and the RN decided in May 1940 to replace 'X' mount with two QF 4-inch (102 mm) Mark XVI dual-purpose guns in a twin-gun mount. To better control the guns, the existing rangefinder/director was modified to accept a Type 285 gunnery radar as they became available. The number of depth charges was increased to 46 early in the war, and still more were added later. To increase the firing arcs of the AA guns, the rear funnel was shortened and the mainmast was reduced to a short pole mast.

== Construction and career ==
Authorized as one of nine Tribal-class destroyers under the 1936 Naval Estimates, Matabele has been the first and only ship of her name to serve in the Royal Navy. The ship was ordered on 19 June 1936 from Scotts Shipbuilding and Engineering Company and was laid down on 1 October at the company's Greenock shipyard. Launched on 6 October 1937, Matabele was commissioned on 25 January 1939 at a cost of £342,005 which excluded weapons and communications outfits furnished by the Admiralty.

She was initially assigned to the 2nd Tribal Destroyer Flotilla of the Home Fleet, which was renamed the 6th Destroyer Flotilla in April 1939. Her early career with the flotilla mostly involved port visits and exercises. On 12 May she escorted the ocean liner RMS Empress of Australia through the English Channel. Empress of Australia was carrying King George VI and Queen Elizabeth on their Royal Tour to Canada. In June Matabele was assigned to assist in rescue operations for the stricken submarine Thetis which had sunk during builder's trials in Liverpool Bay. On her release from these duties, Matabele resumed her Home Fleet programme with the Flotilla. With war looming, she took up her Home Fleet war station in August, and was deployed for interception and anti-submarine patrol in Home waters.

=== World War II ===
On the outbreak of the Second World War, Matabele carried out duties including the interception of German shipping attempting to return to German ports and commerce raiders on passage to attack British shipping in the Atlantic Ocean, as well as patrols to intercept U-boats operating in Home waters. On 25 September she was deployed with sisters Somali and Mashona to search for the submarine Spearfish, which had been badly damaged during a patrol in Heligoland Bight. Having successfully made contact with Spearfish on 26 September, they escorted her back to the UK under the cover of major warships of the Home Fleet.

Through October to December, Matabele carried out patrols to intercept German ships on passage for attacks on coastal shipping, as well as heading into the Atlantic Ocean for attacks on convoys or for submarine minelayers. She also carried out screening duties for major Home Fleet warships. In January and February 1940 she was under repair at HMNB Devonport for work which included the replacement of turbine blades, damaged due to excess stress during high speed steaming in inclement weather, and the installation of de-gaussing equipment for protection against magnetic mines. She returned to active service in March, and took part in convoy escorts to and from Norway, as well as sweeps to intercept German warships. Whilst carrying out these duties, Matabele came under heavy air attacks on 13 April, and again on 16 April, but escaped undamaged. On 17 April she escorted the cruisers Effingham and Coventry to Bodø. On 18 April she ran aground on Foksen shoal, but managed to re-float with damage to her structure. Effingham also ran aground, but suffered serious damage. Matabele took off troops and equipment from the stricken cruiser, after which Matabele scuttled Effingam with torpedoes and gunfire.

She continued supporting operations off Norway, and then returned to the UK at the end of May for repairs and a refit at Falmouth. This work lasted until July and involved the replacement of her twin 4.7-inch mounting in "X" position aft with a twin 4 inch HA mounting to improve her defence against air attacks. She returned to active service after post refit trials on 19 August. She continued to serve in Home waters and off Norway. On 22 October she and Somali attacked a convoy off Åndalsnes and on 23 October she. Somali and Punjabi sank the German weather ship WBS 5 Adolf Vinnen off Stadlandet. Matabele sank a coaster. November and December were spent operating out of Scapa Flow, including forming part of a screen for the search for the German raider Admiral Scheer which had been reported on passage to attack the Atlantic convoys.

In January 1941 she screened minelaying operations off Norway and on 16 January she escorted the battleship King George V, then on passage to the United States carrying Lord Halifax and senior defence personnel, through the North Western Approaches. Further screening of minelaying operations followed. In March she began to escort convoys, but entered refit again at Vickers-Armstrongs's Barrow-in-Furness yard on 11 April. This lasted until May and consisted of the removal of the mainmast and the top of the after funnel to improve the arcs of fire for her close range weapons. A Type 286M radar was also fitted. On her departure from Barrow on 5 June to rejoin the fleet, she grounded and sustained major damage to her underwater fittings, including her shaft brackets and propellers. She returned to Barrow for repairs, which lasted until mid August.

On 30 August she was deployed with the aircraft carrier Argus, the cruiser Shropshire and the destroyers Punjabi and Somali on a mission to deliver RAF equipment and personnel to North Russia to support Soviet military operations after the Soviet Union had entered the war. The operation was completed successfully and the ships returned to Scapa Flow on 15 November. Matabele spent October to December on patrol, and screening operations off Norway.

== Sinking ==
In January 1942 she formed the screen, with Somali, for the cruiser Trinidad on Convoy PQ 8 from Iceland to Murmansk. The convoy of eight merchant ships plus escorts departed on 11 January, and came under torpedo attack on 17 January one day short of their destination by German submarine U-454 under the command of Kapitänleutnant Burkhard Hackländer. The first sunk was the Russian trawler RT-68 Enisej at 6.32 am. That evening the merchant ship Harmatis was hit at 6.46pm by a single torpedo and taken in tow by the minesweeper HMS Speedwell, with the Matabele providing escort as the rest of the convoy continued on ahead. U-454 was able to manoeuvre into a suitable position and at 10.21 pm fired and hit the Matabele in the stern area with a single torpedo which detonated a magazine, causing the destroyer to sink in less than two minutes at position 69.21N 35.24E.

Unable to free their Carley life rafts the surviving crew were forced to jump overboard into the freezing sea, with many being killed when the Matabele's depth charges exploded as the ship sank. The ice-cold sea temperatures then caused further loss of life to such an extent that out of her complement of 238 only two survived of the four that were rescued up by the minesweeper Harrier.
