= HMS Somali =

Destroyer of the Royal Navy

Coordinates: 69°11′N 15°32′W

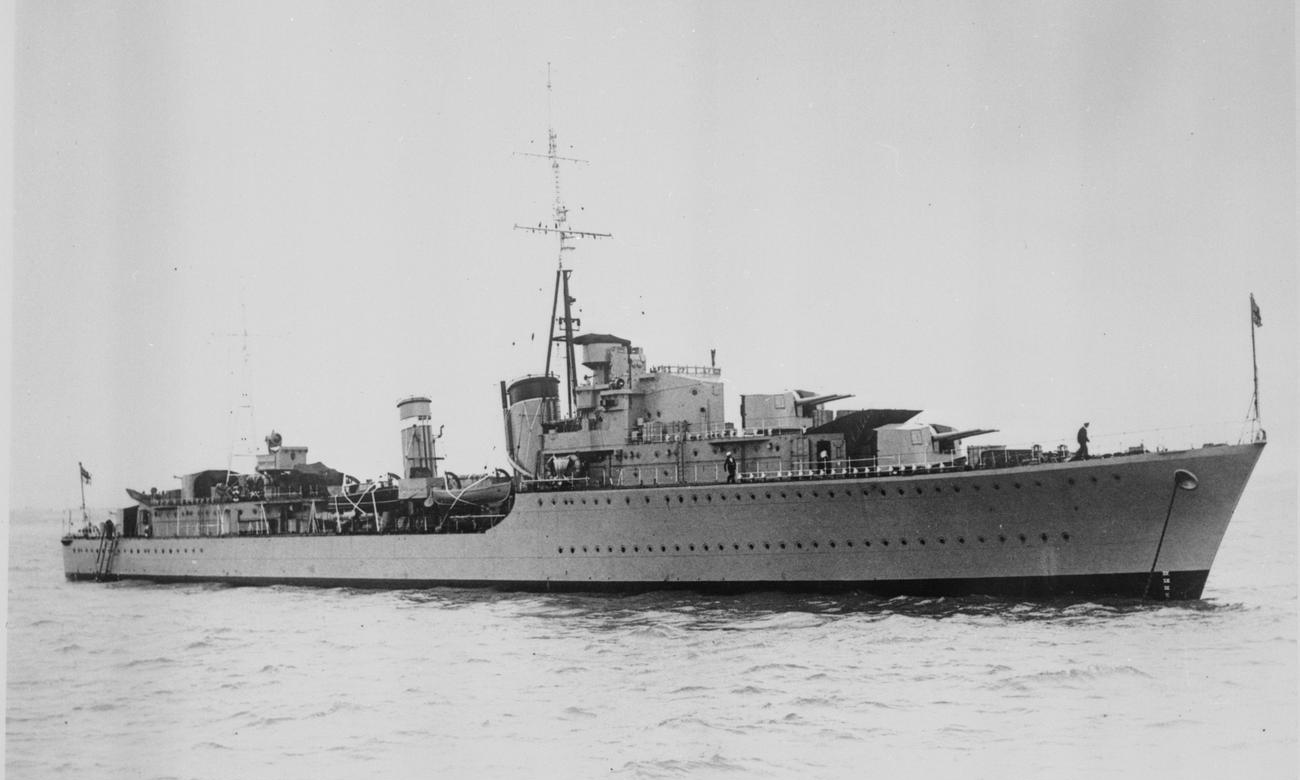
- Somali at anchor

History

United Kingdom
- Name: Somali
- Namesake: Somalis
- Ordered: 19 June 1936
- Builder: Swan Hunter, Tyne and Wear
- Cost: £340,095
- Laid down: 27 August 1936
- Launched: 24 August 1937
- Completed: 7 December 1938
- Commissioned: 12 December 1938
- Identification: Pennant numbers: L33/F33/G33
- Fate: Torpedoed and sank while under tow, 25 September 1942

General characteristics (as built)
- Class & type: Tribal-class destroyer
- Displacement: 1,891 long tons (1,921 t) (standard); 2,519 long tons (2,559 t) (deep load)
- Length: 377 ft (114.9 m) (o/a)
- Beam: 36 ft 6 in (11.13 m)
- Draught: 11 ft 3 in (3.43 m)
- Installed power: 3 × Admiralty 3-drum boilers; 44,000 shp (33,000 kW)
- Propulsion: 2 × shafts; 2 × geared steam turbines
- Speed: 36 knots (67 km/h; 41 mph)
- Range: 5,700 nmi (10,600 km; 6,600 mi) at 15 knots (28 km/h; 17 mph)
- Complement: 190
- Sensors & processing systems: ASDIC
- Armament: 4 × twin 4.7 in (120 mm) guns; 1 × quadruple 2-pdr (40 mm (1.6 in)) AA guns; 2 × quadruple 0.5 in (12.7 mm) anti-aircraft machineguns; 1 × quadruple 21 in (533 mm) torpedo tubes; 20 × depth charges, 1 × rack, 2 × throwers

HMS Somali was a Tribal-class destroyer of the British Royal Navy that saw service in World War II. Completed in 1938, she captured the first prize of World War II and served in Home and Mediterranean waters. She was torpedoed on 20 September 1942 in the Arctic and foundered five days later while under tow.

== Description ==
The Tribals were intended to counter the large destroyers being built abroad and to improve the firepower of the existing destroyer flotillas and were thus significantly larger and more heavily armed than the preceding I class. The ships displaced 1,891 long tons (1,921 t) at standard load and 2,519 long tons (2,559 t) at deep load. They had an overall length of 377 feet (114.9 m), a beam of 36 feet 6 inches (11.13 m) and a draught of 11 feet 3 inches (3.43 m). The destroyers were powered by two Parsons geared steam turbines, each driving one propeller shaft using steam provided by three Admiralty three-drum boilers. The turbines developed a total of 44,000 shaft horsepower (33,000 kW) and gave a maximum speed of 36 knots (67 km/h; 41 mph). During her sea trials Somali made 36.5 knots (67.6 km/h; 42.0 mph) from 44,207 shp (32,965 kW) at a displacement of 2,014 long tons (2,046 t). The ships carried enough fuel oil to give them a range of 5,700 nautical miles (10,600 km; 6,600 mi) at 15 knots (28 km/h; 17 mph). The ships' complement consisted of 190 officers and ratings, although the flotilla leaders carried an extra 20 officers and men consisting of the Captain (D) and his staff.

The primary armament of the Tribal-class destroyers was eight quick-firing (QF) 4.7-inch (120 mm) Mark XII guns in four superfiring twin-gun mounts, one pair each fore and aft of the superstructure, designated 'A', 'B', 'X', and 'Y' from front to rear. The mounts had a maximum elevation of 40°. For anti-aircraft (AA) defence, they carried a single quadruple mount for the 40-millimetre (1.6 in) QF two-pounder Mk II "pom-pom" gun and two quadruple mounts for the 0.5-inch (12.7 mm) Mark III machine gun. Low-angle fire for the main guns was controlled by the director-control tower (DCT) on the bridge roof that fed data acquired by it and the 12-foot (3.7 m) rangefinder on the Mk II Rangefinder/Director directly aft of the DCT to an analogue mechanical computer, the Mk I Admiralty Fire Control Clock. Anti-aircraft fire for the main guns was controlled by the Rangefinder/Director which sent data to the mechanical Fuze Keeping Clock.

The ships were fitted with a single above-water quadruple mount for 21-inch (533 mm) torpedoes. The Tribals were not intended as anti-submarine ships, but they were provided with ASDIC, one depth charge rack and two throwers for self-defence, although the throwers were not mounted in all ships; Twenty depth charges was the peacetime allotment, but this increased to 30 during wartime.

=== Wartime modifications ===
Heavy losses to German air attack during the Norwegian Campaign demonstrated the ineffectiveness of the Tribals' anti-aircraft suite and the RN decided in May 1940 to replace 'X' mount with two QF 4-inch (102 mm) Mark XVI dual-purpose guns in a twin-gun mount. To better control the guns, the existing rangefinder/director was modified to accept a Type 285 gunnery radar as they became available. The number of depth charges was increased to 46 early in the war, and still more were added later. To increase the firing arcs of the AA guns, the rear funnel was shortened and the mainmast was reduced to a short pole mast.

== Construction and career ==
Authorized as one of nine Tribal-class destroyers under the 1936 Naval Estimates, Somali was the second ship of her name to serve in the Royal Navy. The ship was ordered on 19 June 1936 from Swan Hunter & Wigham Richardson and was laid down on 27 August at the company's Wallsend, Tyne and Wear, shipyard. launched on 24 August 1937, Somali was completed on 7 December 1938 and commissioned five days later. The ship cost £340,095 which excluded weapons and communications outfits furnished by the Admiralty.

On 3 September 1939, Somali intercepted the German freighter Hannah Böge, 350 miles south of Iceland, and took her as a prize. This was the first enemy merchant ship to be captured during the war.

The Norway campaign saw Somali highly active in response. She took part in operations with the cruisers Glasgow and Sheffield, in Norwegian inshore wasters from 11 April, which culminated in the landing of an advanced party at Namsos on 14 April in preparation for the Namsos campaign. On 15 April, Somali was attacked three times by German bombers, and although not damaged, had fired off all her anti-aircraft ammunition and was sent back to Britain to replenish her ammunition stocks the next day. From 30 April until 2 May 1940, Somali took part in the evacuation of troops from Ålesund, Åndalsnes and Molde in central Norway. On 15 May 1940, Somali was carrying Brigadier the Hon. William Fraser, commander of 24th Guards Brigade, back to Harstad from a reconnaissance of Mo when she was bombed by German aircraft and forced to return to the United Kingdom for repairs, taking the Brigadier with her. He did not reach Harstad until 23 May.

Somali was under repair and refit by Harland & Wolff at their Liverpool shipyard between 20 May and 1 September 1940, with the opportunity taken to fit two 4-inch anti-aircraft guns in place of two 4.7 inch guns.On completion of these works, Somali was appointed leader of the 6th Destroyer Flotilla. On 23 October, Matabele, Punjabi and Somali shelled and sank WBS 5 Adolf Vinnen in the Norwegian Sea off Stadlandet, Norway. Somali spent most of the winter of 1940–41 screening Home Fleet sweeps.

On 4 March 1941, Somali took part in Operation Claymore, a raid on the German-occupied Lofoten Islands of northern Norway. The destroyer encountered the German armed trawler Krebs while patrolling off the landing sites, and shelled the trawler, setting Krebs on fire. A boarding party from Somali found two rotor wheels for an Enigma cypher machine, and its code books for February aboard the sinking trawler. In May 1941, Somali took part in Operation EG, a sweep by British cruisers and destroyers to capture German weather ships to recover more cryptographic material. On 7 May, Somali captured the German weather ship München. Prior to being boarded, the crew of München threw overboard the ship's Enigma machine and the current code setting in a weighted bag. However, documents on the operation of the Enigma machine were left on board, including the settings for June, providing a breakthrough for Allied codebreakers.

On 13 August 1942, Somali rescued all 105 crew of the American cargo ship Almeria Lykes, which had been torpedoed by E boats while taking part in Operation Pedestal. The rescued crew were landed at Gibraltar.

== Fate ==
Lieutenant Commander Colin Maud took over as captain in September 1942 when her own captain, Jack Eaton, was ill. On 20 September 1942 Somali was torpedoed by U-703 while covering Convoy QP 14 during the Russian convoys. She was hit in her engine room, and although taken under tow by the destroyer Ashanti, she sank on 25 September, after heavy weather broke her back. Of the 102 men on board, only 35 were rescued from the Arctic waters. Leading Seaman Goad of Ashanti was awarded the Albert Medal for "great bravery in saving life at sea" after diving into the freezing water to save Lieutenant Commander Maud.

Somali was the last Royal Navy Tribal-class destroyer to be sunk during the war.
