= HMS King George V (41) =

King George V-class battleship of the Royal Navy

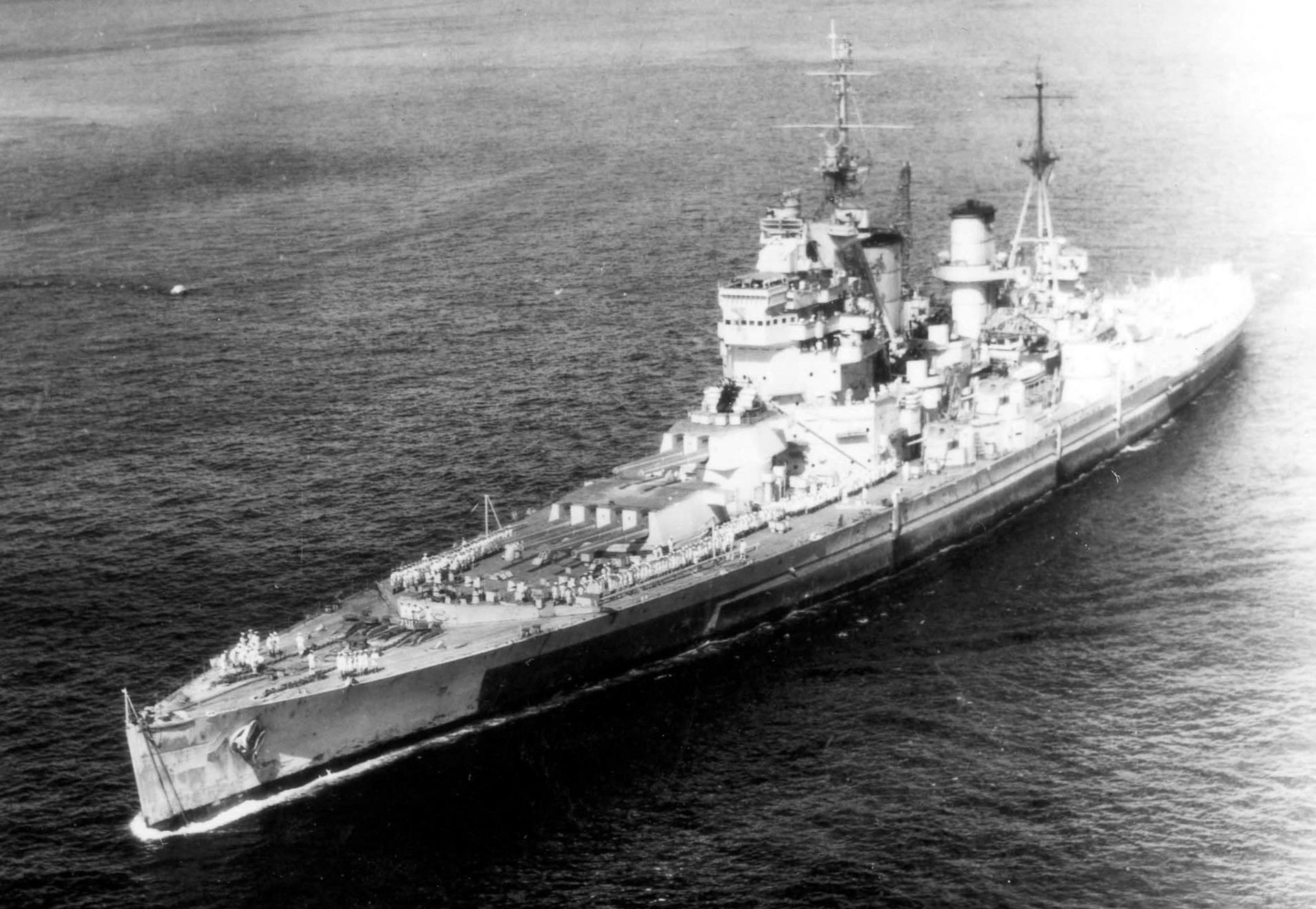
- HMS King George V enters Apra Harbour, Guam with sailors on deck in 1945

History

United Kingdom
- Name: HMS King George V
- Namesake: George V
- Builder: Vickers-Armstrongs, Newcastle upon Tyne, England
- Laid down: 1 January 1937
- Launched: 21 February 1939
- Commissioned: 1 October 1940
- Decommissioned: 1949
- Stricken: 17 December 1957
- Nickname(s): KGV
- Honours and awards: Jutland 1916 (inherited); Atlantic 1941; Bismarck 1941; Arctic 1942−43; Sicily 1943; Okinawa 1945; Japan 1945
- Fate: Sold for scrap, 1957
- Notes: Pennant number 41

General characteristics
- Class & type: King George V-class battleship
- Displacement: 42,200 tons (1941)
- Length: 745 ft (227 m)
- Beam: 103 ft (31 m)
- Draught: 32.6 ft (9.9 m)
- Propulsion: 8 Admiralty three-drum small-tube boilers with superheaters; 4 Parsons single-reduction geared turbines; 4 three-bladed propellers, 14 ft 6 in (4.42 m) diameter; 125,000 shp (93,000 kW)
- Speed: 28.0 knots (51.9 km/h) (1941 trials)
- Range: +5,400 nautical miles (10,000 km) at 18 knots (33 km/h) (11.9 tons/hour fuel burn)
- Complement: 1,314 to 1,631
- Armament: 10 × BL 14-inch (356 mm) Mk VII guns; 16 × QF 5.25-inch (133 mm) Mk I guns; 64 × 2 pounder "pom-pom" (40 mm)
- Armour: Main belt: 15 inches (380 mm); lower belt: 6 inches (150 mm); deck: up to 5.6 inches (140 mm); main turrets: 13 inches (330 mm); barbettes: 13 inches (330 mm)
- Aircraft carried: 4 Supermarine Walrus seaplanes, 1 double-ended catapult

HMS King George V (pennant number 41) was the lead ship of the five British King George V-class battleships of the Royal Navy. Laid down in 1937 and commissioned in 1940, King George V operated during the Second World War in all three major naval theatres of war, the Atlantic, Mediterranean and Pacific, as part of the British Home Fleet and Pacific Fleets. In May 1941, along with HMS Rodney, King George V was involved in the hunt for and pursuit of the German battleship Bismarck, eventually inflicting severe damage which led to the German vessel's sinking. On 1 May 1942 the destroyer HMS Punjabi sank after a collision with King George V in foggy conditions. King George V took part in Operation Husky (the allied landings in Sicily) and bombarded the island of Levanzo and the port of Trapani. She also escorted part of the surrendered Italian Fleet, which included the battleships Andrea Doria and Duilio, to Malta. In 1945 King George V took part in operations against the Japanese in the Pacific.

King George V was made flagship of the British Home Fleet on 1 April 1941, she remained so during the rest of the war and became a training battleship in November 1947.

== Design ==
=== General characteristics ===
King George V was built by Vickers-Armstrongs at Walker Naval Yard, Newcastle upon Tyne; she was laid down on 1 January 1937, launched on 21 February 1939 and commissioned on 11 December 1940. The ship had an overall length of 745 ft (227 m), a beam of 112 ft (34 m) and a draught of 34 ft (10 m). She displaced 38,031 tons at normal load and 42,237 tons at full load. After her refit in 1944, she displaced 39,100 tons at standard load, and 44,460 tons at full load. She could carry 3,918 tons of fuel oil, 192 tons of diesel oil, 256 tons of reserve feed water and 444 tons of freshwater. Based on the designed fuel consumption, range was: 4,000 nautical miles (7,400 km; 4,600 mi) at 25 knots (46 km/h; 29 mph), 10,250 nautical miles (18,980 km; 11,800 mi) at 15 knots (28 km/h; 17 mph) and 14,400 nautical miles (26,700 km; 16,600 mi) at 10 knots (19 km/h; 12 mph). However, in practice fuel consumption was much higher, and at 16 knots (30 km/h) the actual range was about 6,300 nautical miles (11,700 km) with a five per cent reserve allowance. (Note: The King George V-class battleships had their fuel capacity increased during World War II. Using their design fuel capacity HMS Howe used 9.4 long tons (9.55 tonnes) of fuel per hour at 16 knots using giving her a range of 5980 nautical miles using 3667 long tons of fuel. HMS King George V with her increased fuel capacity of 3918 long tons of fuel had a range of 6670 nautical miles with no reserve.) Designed within the tight 35,000 ton limitations of the Washington Naval Treaty, wartime service necessitated increases over the design displacement, seriously reducing freeboard and affecting seaworthiness. This was most acute at the already low bow. With too little buoyancy forward the bows were easily buried even in moderate seas, with spray washing up over both forward turrets. Heavy seas could flood 'A' turret, drenching both men and machinery within.

=== Propulsion ===
King George V was equipped with eight Admiralty boilers. This configuration was a little more conventional than the preceding Nelson class, with boiler rooms placed side by side and with each pair associated with a turbine room astern of them. The total heating surface of the boiler plants in King George V was 78,144 ft^{2} (7,259.8 m^{2}). The 416-ton boiler installation produced more than 100,000 shaft horsepower (75,000 kW), giving a top speed of 28 knots. The eight boilers were more economic in space and fuel than the twenty-four boilers in the battlecruiser HMS Hood. Fewer but larger boilers lowered the weight per unit of heat delivered, as did increased boiler efficiency and consumption of fuel per unit area of heating surface. This made King George V the fastest battleship in the British fleet but slower than the German, French or the new Italian capital ships, or the battlecruisers HMS Hood, Repulse and Renown.

King George V had four sets of Parsons geared turbines. Two main turbines were arranged in series and drove a shaft through double helical gears. An astern turbine was incorporated in the exhaust casing of the low-pressure turbine, and a cruising turbine was coupled directly to the high-pressure turbine. A speed of 28.5 knots was expected at standard displacement and 27.5 knots at full-load displacement on normal output; corresponding speeds at overload condition were 29.25 and 28.25 knots respectively. The turbine unit was a low-speed type (2,257 rpm) coupled to a single reduction gear which produced 236 rpm at the propeller shaft. (Note: The King George V-class battleships had their steam plant specifications revised during the building phase, and as built the ships actually produced 110,000 shp at 230 rpm, and were designed for an overload power of 125,000 shp, which was exceeded in service.)

=== Armament ===
==== Main battery ====
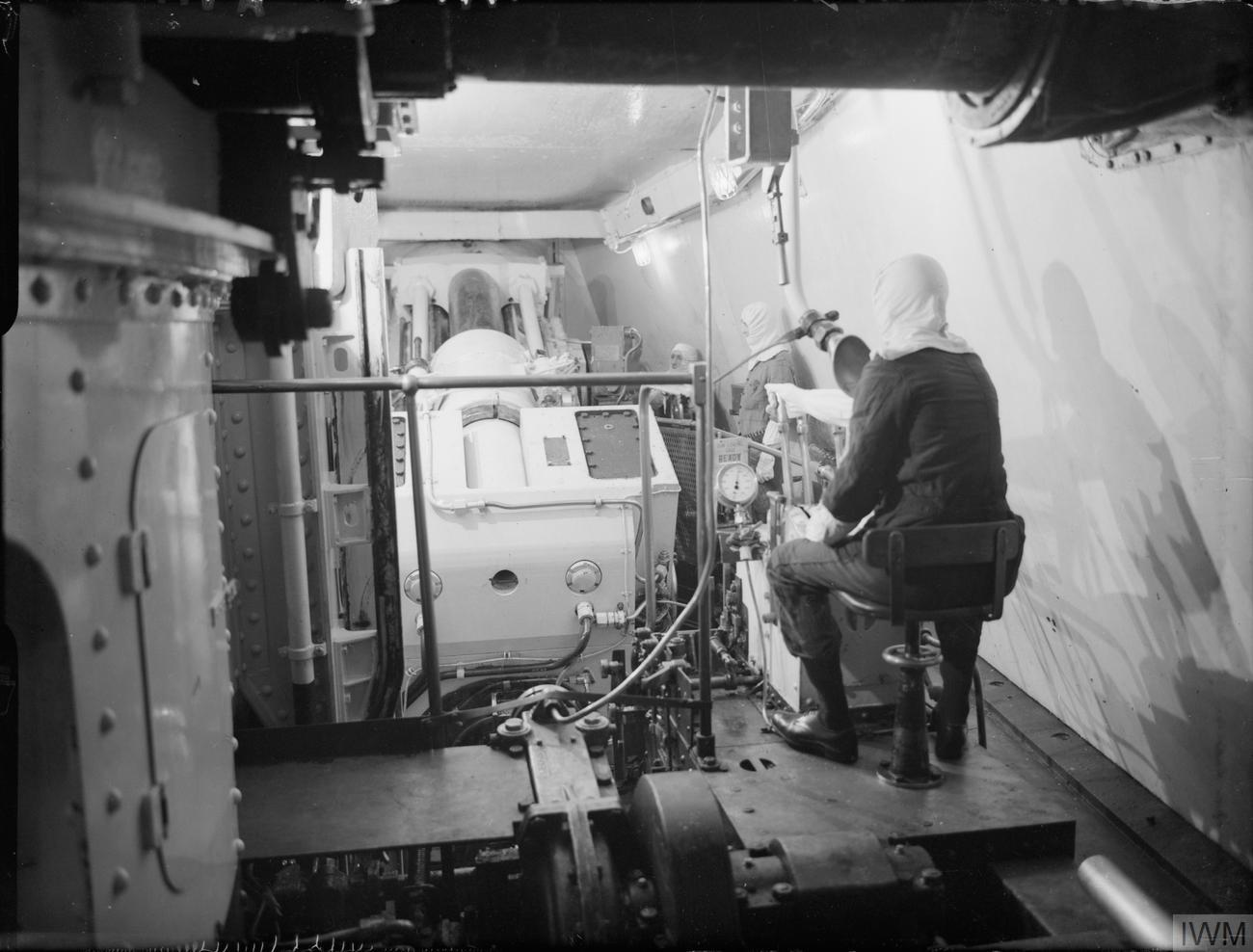
Interior of one of the 14-inch turrets, looking forward from the gunloading cage

The tight limitations of the Washington Naval Treaty raised many challenges and required difficult compromises if they were to be met. To avoid the class being outgunned by the new ships of foreign navies, especially as by the mid-1930s the Treaty had been renounced by Japan and Italy, Churchill wrote to the First Lord of the Admiralty in 1936, voicing strong objections to the proposed armament of ten 14-inch guns. His proposal was for nine 16-inch guns.

When completed King George V mounted ten 14-inch (356 mm) guns. They were mounted in one Mark II twin turret forward and two Mark III quadruple turrets, one forward and one aft. They could be elevated 40 degrees and depressed 3 degrees. Training arcs were: "A" turret, 286 degrees; "B" turret, 270 degrees and "Y" turret, 270 degrees. Training and elevating was achieved through a hydraulic drive, with rates of two and eight degrees per second, respectively. A full gun broadside weighed 15,950 pounds; a salvo could be fired every 30 seconds. The quadruple turrets weighed 1,582 tons, the twin turret 915 tons.

The turrets were designed by the Vickers Armstrong's Elswick Works, but sets of each type of equipment were manufactured by Vickers Armstrongs in Barrow. A considerable amount of design effort was expended to make the turrets as flashtight as possible. This complicated the mechanical design of the turrets, particularly the quadruple mountings. Due to insufficient clearances and slightly distorted link mechanisms, failures in the intricate safety interlocks in the loading sequence for antiflash precautions caused jams during drills and practice firing. During the summer of 1941 the King George V-class battleships had their main armament turrets and turret linkages modified to correct the operational faults revealed during Bismarck's final operation. HMS King George V used an Admiralty Fire Control Table Mark IX to control her main armament.

==== Secondary battery ====
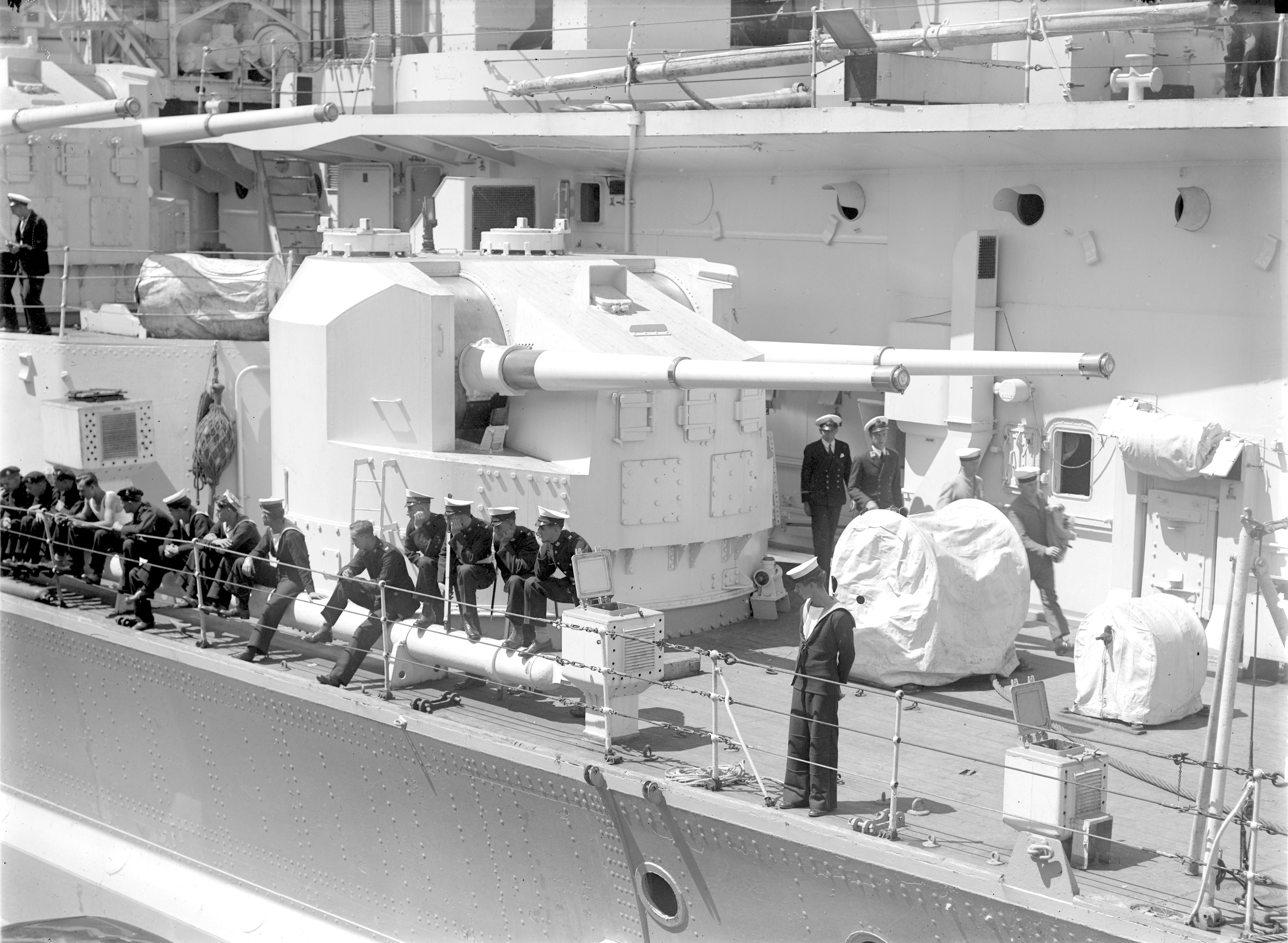
One of the main deck QF 5.25-inch gun turrets in 1945

The secondary armament consisted of sixteen 5.25-inch (133 mm) guns in eight twin mounts, weighing 81 tons each. They were grouped at the four corners of the citadel, with a twin mount on the main deck and another superimposed above it nearer amidships. This disposition gave better arcs of fire, freedom from blast, more separation of the magazines and a better arrangement of the ammunition supply. The cupolas for these mounts revolved on either the upper or superstructure deck; between deck mountings travelled on roller paths on the armoured deck. This permitted a flat-trajectory or high-angle fire. Loading was semi-automatic, normal rate of fire was ten to twelve rounds per minute. The maximum range of the Mk I guns was 24,070 yards (22,010 m) at a 45-degree elevation, the anti-aircraft ceiling was 49,000 feet (14,940 m). The guns could be elevated to 70 degrees and depressed to 5 degrees. However, the guns could only practically fire seven to eight rounds per minute, due to the heavy weight of the shell and the fact that the 5.25-inch round was semi-fixed, requiring the crew to separately load the cartridge and shell into the breech. King George V introduced the High Angle Control System Mark IVGB anti-aircraft fire control system to the Royal Navy, which, along with the Mk IV Pom-Pom Director, pioneered the use of the Gyro Rate Unit.

==== Anti-aircraft battery ====
The King George V design had four 0.5-inch quadruple machine gun mounts, but in 1939 these were replaced by two Mark VI pom-pom mounts. In 1940, to combat air attack, four Unrotated Projectile mountings were fitted, on "B" turret, two on "Y" turret, one replaced a pom-pom mount added in 1939 at the stern. The pom-poms mounted in the King George V were designed and produced by Vickers Armstrongs as a result of a post-First World War requirement for a multiple mounting which was effective against close-range bombers or torpedo planes. The first model, tested in 1927, was superior to anything developed in other countries at the time and in 1938 the Mark VI* had a muzzle velocity of 2,400 feet per second, a 1.594-inch bore and a barrel length of 40 calibres. They fired a 1.8-pound (0.82 kg) shell at a rate of 96–98 rounds per minute for controlled fire and 115 rounds per minute for automatic fire. The range of the Mark VI* was 6,800 yards (6,200 m), at a muzzle velocity of 2,300 feet per second. The Mark VI octuple mount weighed 16 tons. The Mark VII quadruple mount weighed 10.8 tons if power operated; it could be elevated to 80 degrees and depressed to 10 degrees at a rate of 25 degrees per second which was also the rate of train. The normal ammunition supply on board for the Mark VI was 1,800 rounds per barrel. King George V introduced the Mk IV Pom-pom director to the Royal Navy in 1940, becoming the first ship in the world to feature gyroscopic target tracking in tachymetric anti-aircraft directors.

== Operational history ==
The first of her class to be completed, King George V was commissioned at her shipyard and sailed for Rosyth in Scotland on 16 October 1940; there she took on board her ammunition and began her sea trials. By the end of the year she had joined the Home Fleet at Scapa Flow. She crossed the Atlantic early in 1941 to take Lord Halifax, the Ambassador to the United States, to Annapolis and covered the east-bound convoy BHX 104 on her return, arriving back at Scapa Flow on 6 February. Her next task was to provide distant cover for Operation Claymore, the commando raid on the Lofoten islands off the north-west coast of Norway. In March, she was assigned to escort the Atlantic convoy HX 115, sailing from Scapa Flow on 9 March and arriving at Halifax, Nova Scotia on 15 March. King George V left Halifax the next day to search with HMS Rodney for the German battleships Scharnhorst and Gneisenau who were attacking convoy ships south of Cape Race, Newfoundland as part of Operation Berlin. However fearing a gathering of British capital ships, the two German battleships broke off their attacks and returned to France. King George V joined Convoy HX 115 to provide escort on 20 March and returned to Scapa Flow at the end of March.

=== Action with Bismarck ===
When the German battleship Bismarck along with the heavy cruiser Prinz Eugen broke out into the Atlantic Ocean, King George V sailed on 22 May 1941 with the aircraft carrier Victorious and eleven cruisers and destroyers in support of the cruiser patrols off Iceland. King George V was the flagship of Admiral Sir John Tovey, who commanded the force. King George V was still 260 to 350 nmi (480 to 640 km) away on the morning of 24 May, when sister ship Prince of Wales and Hood engaged both Bismarck and Prinz Eugen. Hood was sunk and Prince of Wales was damaged when taking fire from both Bismarck and Prinz Eugen and forced to retire. Bismarck, although damaged, continued south with Prinz Eugen.

The British re-located Bismarck at 10:30 on 26 May, when a Catalina flying boat of RAF Coastal Command sighted her, heading for the French port of Brest. Rodney and King George V were still about 110 nmi (200 km) away. The aircraft carrier Ark Royal was ordered to launch an air attack, and at 22:25 her torpedo bombers, a flight of Fairey Swordfishes damaged Bismarck, slowing her down and jamming her rudder, forcing her to turn back out into the Atlantic, away from the safety of port. At 15:00 Rodney joined King George V and they maintained 22 knots – which was nearly maximum speed for Rodney. King George V had only 32 per cent of her fuel left while Rodney had only enough fuel to continue the chase at high speed until 8:00 the following day.

Admiral Tovey signalled his battle plan to Rodney just before sunrise on 27 May; she was free to manœuvre independently as long as she conformed generally to the movements of King George V. Both ships were to close the range to 15,000 yards (14,000 m) as quickly as possible, then turn for broadside fire.

At 08:15 the cruiser Norfolk spotted Bismarck and turned away out of range. She soon sighted the other British ships off her starboard quarter, and informed them that Bismarck was roughly 50,000 yards (46,000 m) to the southwest. By 08:43 King George V had Bismarck in sight, at 20,500 yards (18,700 m). Four minutes later Rodney opened fire. King George V followed suit in less than a minute. Bismarck answered almost immediately, straddling Rodney on her second salvo. By 08:59 King George V had closed to 16,000 yards (15,000 m) and all her 14-inch guns were firing; Rodney was firing 16-inch salvoes. Bismarck concentrated all her remaining guns on King George V, but only an occasional shell came close. At 09:14 King George V, at 12,000 yards (11,000 m), had opened fire with her 5.25-inch guns, and Rodney had moved to 8,500–9,000 yards (7,800–8,200 m).

At 09:27 a shell hitting Bismarck penetrated the hydraulic machinery in turret 'Anton' and disabled it, causing the guns to run down to maximum depression. Her topsides were wrecked, and a large fire burned amidships. After firing steadily for over 30 minutes, without any problems, King George V, by 09:27, began having trouble with her main battery, and from that point onward every gun missed at least one salvo due to failures in the safety interlocks for antiflash protection and from ammunition feed jams. At 10:21, with Bismarck silenced and obviously sinking, Admiral Tovey detailed the cruiser Dorsetshire to finish her off with torpedoes. King George V fired 339 14 in (356 mm) and over 700 5.25 in (133 mm) shells during the action. As both Rodney and King George V were low on fuel they returned to port at 19 knots (35 km/h), escorted by eleven destroyers to guard against German air or submarine attack. The next day, after the escort was reduced to three destroyers, four German aircraft did attack but scored no hits. Both King George V and Rodney returned to port safely, but the destroyer Mashona, sent ahead to refuel, was bombed and sunk.

=== Collision damage ===
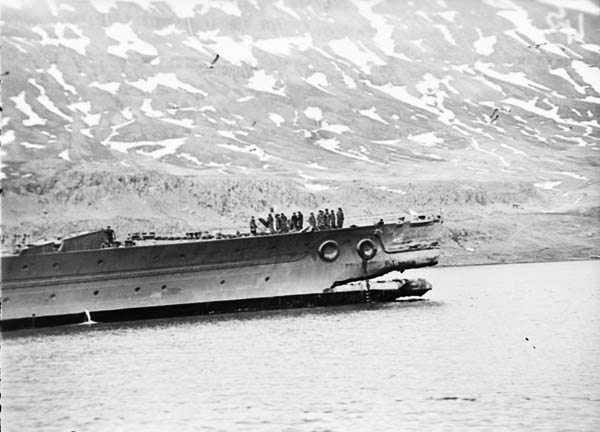
Damage to the bow of HMS King George V, after her collision with HMS Punjabi in dense fog on 1 May 1942, at Seyðisfjörður, Iceland.

After repairs and adjustments to her guns, King George V attacked German shipping in the Glom Fjord, Norway, in October 1941. She then covered convoys to Russia. On 1 May 1942 she was operating with USS Washington as an escort to Convoy PQ 15, and collided with the destroyer HMS Punjabi, which had manoeuvred to avoid a mine and crossed her bow in dense fog. Punjabi was cut in two and sank; King George V had 40 feet (12 m) of her bow badly damaged. King George V entered the Gladstone Dock in Liverpool on 9 May for repairs by Cammell Laird, and returned to Scapa Flow on 1 July 1942. The battleship did not leave Scapa Flow until 18 December when she finally resumed convoy escort duty, providing distant cover for the Arctic convoy JW 51A.

=== Mediterranean operations ===
In May 1943, King George V was moved to Gibraltar in preparation for Operation Husky, the Allied invasion of Sicily. King George V and her sister ship Howe were allocated to the reserve covering group when the operation got under way on 1 July. The two ships bombarded Trapani in Sicily on 12 July and also helped defend against an air raid whilst in Algiers prior to departing for Operation Avalanche, (the Allied invasion of Italy). The two ships also bombarded the islands of Levanzo and Favignana, after which they were in the reserve group for the Salerno landings (Operation Avalanche) which began on 9 September. King George V escorted part of the Italian Fleet, including the battleships Andrea Doria and Duilio, to Malta after the armistice and with Howe provided cover for the 1st Airborne Division who were transported to Taranto in support of Operation Slapstick from 9 to 11 September by the cruiser USS Boise and the fast minelayer HMS Abdiel. The battleship then escorted a naval force which occupied the Italian naval base at Taranto. She later escorted surrendered Italian ships from Malta to Alexandria. After bombarding German positions during the Salerno landings, King George V returned to the United Kingdom.

=== Pacific operations ===
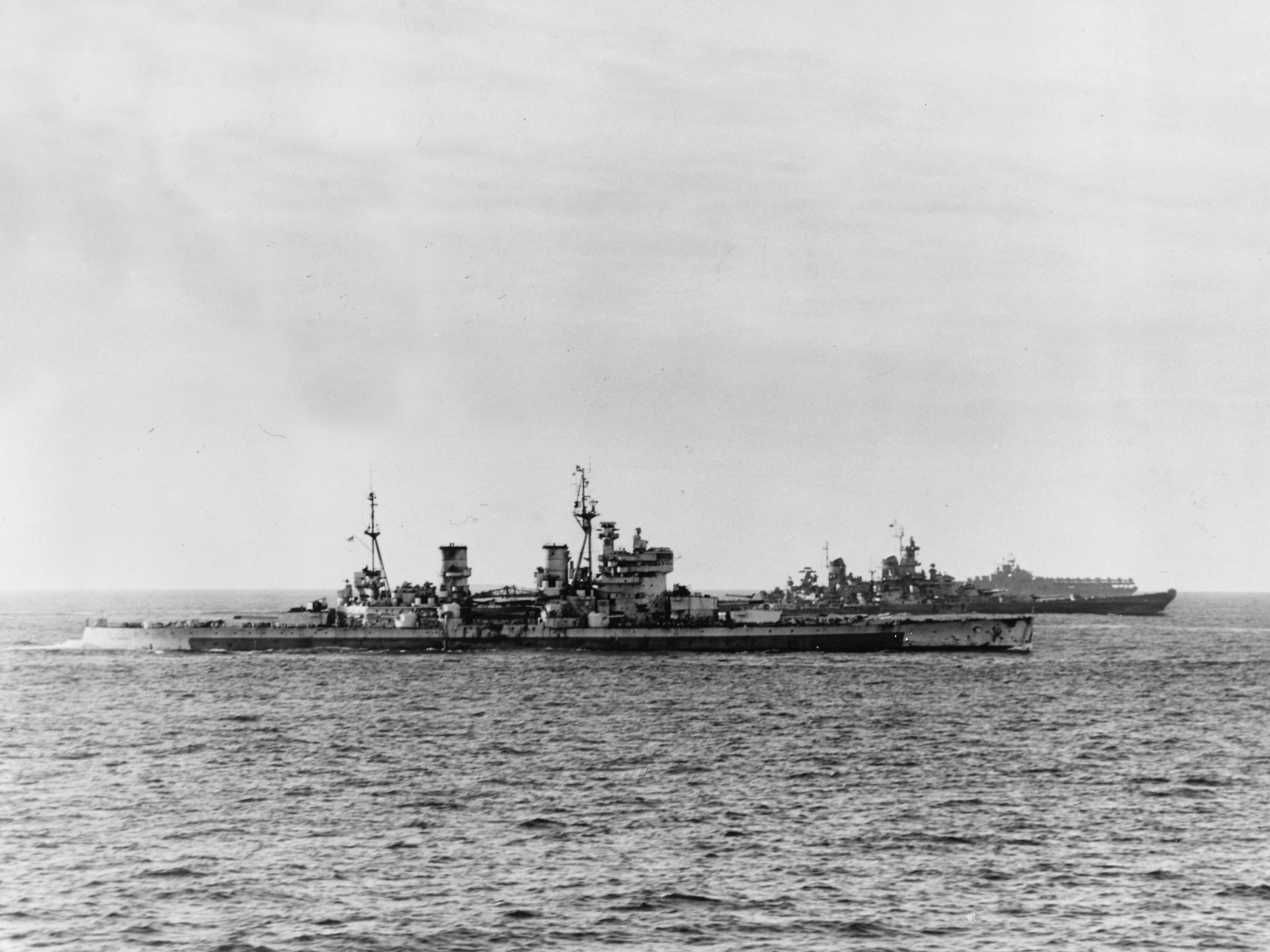
HMS King George V in Tokyo harbour in 1945. USS Missouri and an Essex-class aircraft carrier are visible in the background.

King George V was in Liverpool for an overhaul from March to June, 1944; it included the installation of additional radar gear, more anti-aircraft guns, improved accommodation, and ventilation. On 28 October 1944 King George V sailed from Scapa Flow under the command of Admiral Sir Bruce Fraser to join other Royal Navy units assembling at Trincomalee in Ceylon. A stop at Alexandria en route enabled her to divert to Milos in the Aegean Sea to bombard German positions. On 1 December she resumed her eastward journey, arriving in Trincomalee on 15 December. King George V got under way again on 16 January 1945. The flotilla, known as TF 63, comprised King George V, the aircraft carriers Illustrious, Indomitable, Indefatigable and Victorious, four cruisers and ten destroyers. The first stage of the voyage was covering the 11,000 nautical miles to Sydney; en route the force attacked oil refineries on Sumatra in Operation Meridian. They also practised replenishment-at-sea and beat off a Japanese air attack, with King George V's anti-aircraft crews shooting down one Mitsubishi Ki-21.

Joined by Howe and re-designated Task Force 57, the British Pacific Fleet was again involved in operations in late March 1945, when it launched attacks on the Sakishimo-Gunto airfields, a task it repeated in early May. On 4 May 1945 King George V led battleships and cruisers in a forty-five-minute bombardment of Japanese air facilities in the Ryukyu Islands. As the Allies approached the Japanese homeland, King George V was dispatched in mid-July to join the US battleships in a bombardment of industrial installations at Hitachi. King George V fired 267 rounds from her 14-inch guns during this operation. The task force then moved on to Hamamatsu in southern Honshu, where it carried out a further bombardment of aviation factories. During the Okinawa campaign, the battleship supported four fast carriers of the British Pacific Fleet. Her last offensive action was a night bombardment of Hamamatsu on 29 and 30 July 1945. With the dropping of the atomic bombs on Hiroshima and Nagasaki and the surrender that followed, King George V moved with other units of the British Pacific Fleet into Tokyo Bay to be present at the surrender ceremonies.

=== Post-war activity ===
In January 1946 she conveyed the Duke and Duchess of Gloucester on an official visit to Australia, returning to Portsmouth in March. She was flagship of the Home Fleet until December 1946, after becoming a training vessel.

King George V's active naval career was terminated by the Royal Navy in June 1950, when she and her surviving sister-ships went into reserve and were mothballed. King George V was the first large warship to be preserved in this fashion. This involved sealing the armament, machinery and boilers against damp and installing dehumidifiers throughout. In December 1955, she was downgraded to extended reserve and in 1957 the decision was taken to scrap the four ships. The following year King George V was moved from her berth in Gareloch to the ship breaking firm of Arnott Young and Co. in Dalmuir to undergo dismantling.

== Refits ==
During her career, King George V was refitted on several occasions in order to update her equipment. The following are the dates and details of the refits undertaken:

Dates	Location	Description of Work
Early 1941		A Type 271 radar was added.
December 1941		Removal of UP mountings; the addition of one 4-barrelled 2 pdr "pom-pom" mounting, one 8-barrelled 2 pdr pom-pom, and 18 × Oerlikon cannon; the UP directors were replaced with pom-pom directors; the Type 271 radar was replaced by the Type 273; five Type 282 radars were also added.
May–June 1942	Liverpool	Damage from the collision with HMS Punjabi was repaired; the external degaussing coil was replaced with an internal coil; four Type 285 radars added; FM2 MF D/F added.
Late 1943		20 × 20 mm Oerlikon cannon added.
February–July 1944	Liverpool	Removal of one 4-barrelled 2 pdr pom-pom, 12 × 20 mm Oerlikon cannon, Type 273 radar and HF/DF; the addition of three 8-barrelled 2 pdr pom-poms, six 2-barrelled 20 mm Oerlikon mounts and two 4-barrelled 40 mm Bofors guns; the Type 279 radar was replaced by the Type 279B, the Type 284 with the Type 274; addition of the Types 277, 293, 2 × 282, and 285 radars, and the RH2 VHF/DF; removal of aircraft and catapult equipment, replaced with new superstructure upon which the ship's boats were relocated, with the old boat deck given over to a significant portion of the new anti-aircraft armament.
1945		Removal of two 20 mm Oerlikon cannon, two 40 mm Bofors guns added.

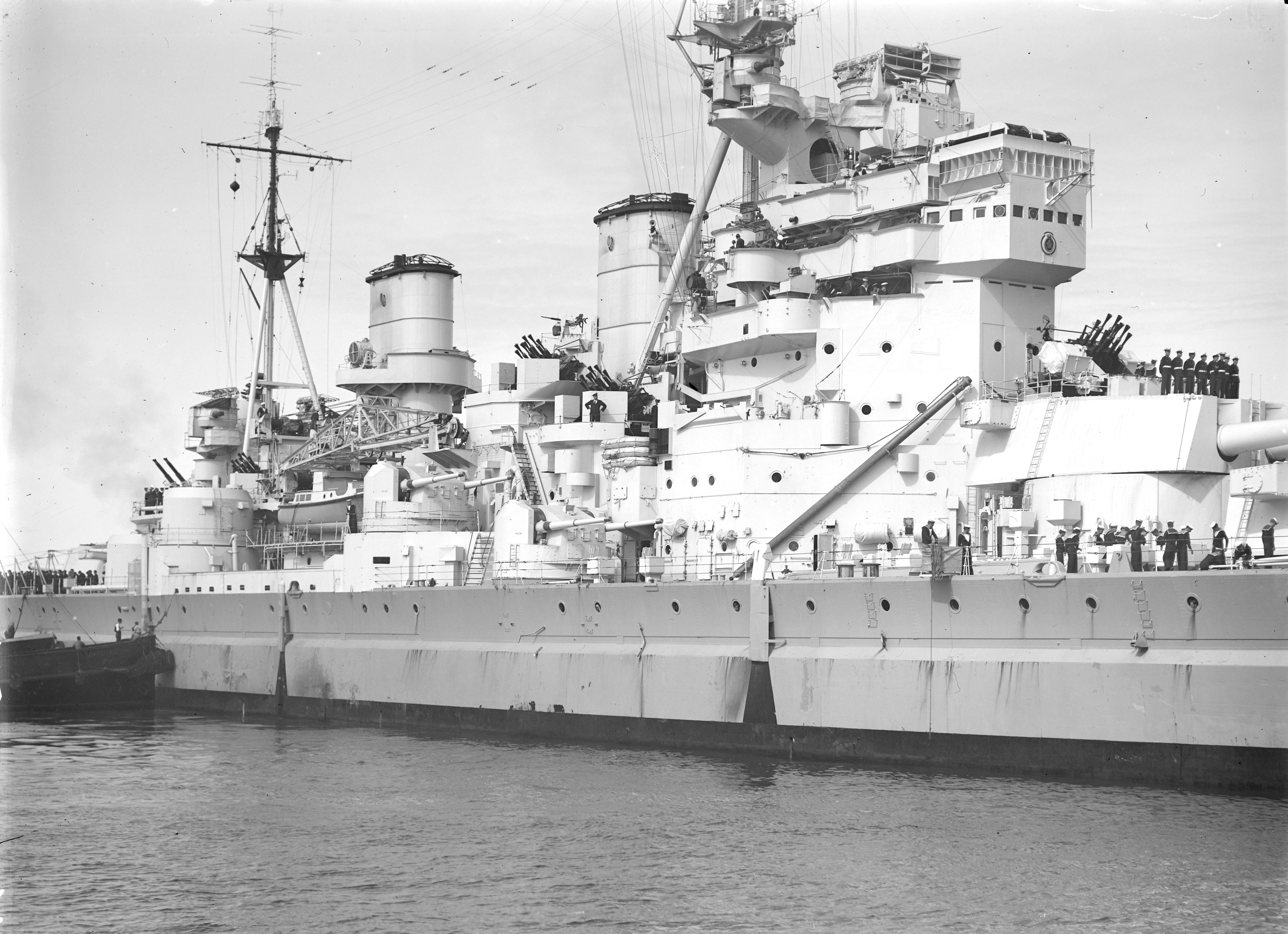
Midships in 1945

== Bibliography ==
- Campbell, John. (1985). Naval Weapons of World War Two. London: Conway Maritime Press. ISBN 0-87021-459-4.
- Campbell, N. J. M. (1980). "Great Britain". In Chesneau, Roger (ed.). Conway's All the World's Fighting Ships 1922–1946. New York: Mayflower Books. pp. 2–85. ISBN 0-8317-0303-2.
- Chesneau, Roger. (2004). Ship Craft 2: King George V Class Battleships. Chatham Publishing. ISBN 1-86176-211-9
- Garzke, William H., Jr.; Dulin, Robert O., Jr. (1980). British, Soviet, French, and Dutch Battleships of World War II. London: Jane's. ISBN 0-7106-0078-X
- Hobbs, Davis (2017). The British Pacific Fleet: The Royal Navy's Most Powerful Strike Force. Barnsley, UK: Seaforth Publishing. ISBN 978-1-5267-0283-8.
- Lenton, H.T.; Colledge, J.J. (1973). Warships of World War II (Second ed.). London: Ian Allan. ISBN 0-7110-0403-X.
- Molony, Brigadier C.J.C.; Flynn, Captain F.C. (R.N.); Davies, Major-General H.L. & Gleave, Group Captain T.P. (2004) [1st. pub. HMSO:1973]. Butler, Sir James (ed.). The Mediterranean and Middle East, Volume V: The Campaign in Sicily 1943 and The Campaign in Italy 3rd September 1943 to 31st March 1944. History of the Second World War, United Kingdom Military Series. Uckfield, UK: Naval & Military Press. ISBN 1-84574-069-6.
- Raven, Alan & Roberts, John (1976). British Battleships of World War Two: The Development and Technical History of the Royal Navy's Battleship and Battlecruisers from 1911 to 1946. Annapolis, Maryland: Naval Institute Press. ISBN 0-87021-817-4.
- Tarrant, V. E. (1991). King George V Class Battleships. London: Arms and Armour. ISBN 1-85409-026-7.
- Tovey, John. (1947). SINKING OF THE GERMAN BATTLESHIP BISMARCK ON 27™ MAY, 1941 London Gazette.
