= German submarine U-454 =

German World War II submarine

History

Nazi Germany
- Name: U-454
- Ordered: 20 October 1939
- Builder: Deutsche Werke, Kiel
- Yard number: 285
- Laid down: 4 July 1940
- Launched: 30 April 1941
- Commissioned: 24 July 1941
- Fate: Sunk on 1 August 1943

General characteristics
- Class & type: Type VIIC submarine
- Displacement: 769 tonnes (757 long tons) surfaced; 871 t (857 long tons) submerged
- Length: 67.10 m (220 ft 2 in) o/a; 50.50 m (165 ft 8 in) pressure hull
- Beam: 6.20 m (20 ft 4 in) o/a; 4.70 m (15 ft 5 in) pressure hull
- Height: 9.60 m (31 ft 6 in)
- Draught: 4.74 m (15 ft 7 in)
- Installed power: 2,800–3,200 PS (2,100–2,400 kW; 2,800–3,200 bhp) (diesels); 750 PS (550 kW; 740 shp) (electric)
- Propulsion: 2 shafts; 2 × diesel engines; 2 × electric motors.
- Speed: 17.7 knots (32.8 km/h; 20.4 mph) surfaced; 7.6 knots (14.1 km/h; 8.7 mph) submerged
- Range: 8,500 nmi (15,700 km; 9,800 mi) at 10 knots (19 km/h; 12 mph) surfaced; 80 nmi (150 km; 92 mi) at 4 knots (7.4 km/h; 4.6 mph) submerged
- Test depth: 230 m (750 ft); Crush depth: 250–295 m (820–968 ft)
- Complement: 4 officers, 40–56 enlisted
- Armament: 5 × 53.3 cm (21 in) torpedo tubes (four bow, one stern); 14 × torpedoes; 1 × 8.8 cm (3.46 in) deck gun (220 rounds); 1 x 2 cm (0.79 in) C/30 AA gun

Service record
- Part of: 5th U-boat Flotilla; 24 July – 31 October 1941; 7th U-boat Flotilla; 1 November 1941 – 1 August 1943
- Identification codes: M 45 537
- Commanders: Kptlt. Burkhard Hackländer; 24 July 1941 – 1 August 1943
- Operations: 10 patrols: 1st patrol: 25 December 1941 – 20 January 1942; 2nd patrol: 27 January – 3 February 1942; 3rd patrol: 24 February – 15 March 1942; 4th patrol: 24 March – 2 April 1942; 5th patrol: a. 8 – 20 April 1942; b. 23 – 29 April 1942; c. 30 April – 3 May 1942; 6th patrol: a. 4 July – 17 August 1942; b. 15 – 16 September 1942; 7th patrol: 26 September – 7 December 1942; 8th patrol: 18 January – 8 March 1943; 9th patrol: 17 April – 23 May 1943; 10th patrol: 26 July – 1 August 1943
- Victories: 1 merchant ship sunk (557 GRT); 1 warship sunk (1,870 tons); 1 merchant ship damaged (5,395 GRT)

German submarine U-454 was a Type VIIC U-boat of Nazi Germany's Kriegsmarine during World War II.

She carried out ten patrols. She sank two ships and damaged one more.

She was sunk in the Bay of Biscay by an Australian aircraft on 1 August 1943.

== Design ==
German Type VIIC submarines were preceded by the shorter Type VIIB submarines. U-454 had a displacement of 769 tonnes (757 long tons) when at the surface and 871 tonnes (857 long tons) while submerged. She had a total length of 67.10 m (220 ft 2 in), a pressure hull length of 50.50 m (165 ft 8 in), a beam of 6.20 m (20 ft 4 in), a height of 9.60 m (31 ft 6 in), and a draught of 4.74 m (15 ft 7 in). The submarine was powered by two Germaniawerft F46 four-stroke, six-cylinder supercharged diesel engines producing a total of 2,800 to 3,200 metric horsepower (2,060 to 2,350 kW; 2,760 to 3,160 shp) for use while surfaced, two Siemens-Schuckert GU 343/38–8 double-acting electric motors producing a total of 750 metric horsepower (550 kW; 740 shp) for use while submerged. She had two shafts and two 1.23 m (4 ft) propellers. The boat was capable of operating at depths of up to 230 metres (750 ft).

The submarine had a maximum surface speed of 17.7 knots (32.8 km/h; 20.4 mph) and a maximum submerged speed of 7.6 knots (14.1 km/h; 8.7 mph). When submerged, the boat could operate for 80 nautical miles (150 km; 92 mi) at 4 knots (7.4 km/h; 4.6 mph); when surfaced, she could travel 8,500 nautical miles (15,700 km; 9,800 mi) at 10 knots (19 km/h; 12 mph). U-454 was fitted with five 53.3 cm (21 in) torpedo tubes (four fitted at the bow and one at the stern), fourteen torpedoes, one 8.8 cm (3.46 in) SK C/35 naval gun, 220 rounds, and a 2 cm (0.79 in) C/30 anti-aircraft gun. The boat had a complement of between forty-four and sixty.

== Service history ==
The submarine was laid down on 4 July 1940 in the Deutsche Werke, Kiel as yard number 285, launched on 30 April 1941 and commissioned on 24 July under the command of Kapitänleutnant Burkhard Hackländer.

She served with the 5th U-boat Flotilla from 24 July 1941 for training and the 7th flotilla from 1 November for operations.

=== First patrol ===
U-454's first patrol was preceded by the short journey from Kiel in Germany to Kirkenes in Norway not far from the border with Russia. The patrol itself commenced with her departure from Kirkenes on 25 December 1941.

She sank the Soviet trawler RT-68 Enise on 17 January 1942 78 nautical miles (144 km; 90 mi) north of Kanin Nos. That same day, she damaged the British registered Harmatis and sank the British destroyer HMS Matabele. The warship was hit in the stern by a torpedo, which caused her magazines to explode; the vessel sank in two minutes. The loss of life was made worse by the detonation of her depth charges and men freezing to death in the icy water.

=== Second and third patrols ===
Her second sortie terminated in Trondheim on 3 February 1942 and had covered the Barents Sea.

The submarine's third patrol was marred by the loss overboard of Matrosengefreiter Josef Kauerlos on 26 February 1942.

=== Fourth and fifth patrols ===
The boat's fourth patrol was also carried out in the Barents Sea.

Her fifth foray was toward Bear Island between 8 and 20 April 1942.

=== Sixth patrol ===
Two more short trips were carried out from Kirkenes and Bergen and finished in Kiel, from where she proceeded via the gap separating Iceland from the Faroe Islands into the Atlantic Ocean. She went as far west as Newfoundland before arriving at St. Nazaire in occupied France on 17 August 1942.

=== Seventh and eighth patrols ===
Patrol number seven started and finished in St. Nazaire and at 73 days, was the boat's longest.

Her eighth sortie was relatively uneventful; the area negotiated was west of Ireland and north of the Azores.

=== Ninth patrol ===
U-454 left St. Nazaire on 17 April 1943. On 10 May, she encountered a Fairey Swordfish from the escort carrier HMS Biter. No damage was incurred, but the U-boat was forced to dive. She returned to France, but this time to La Pallice, on 23 May.

=== Tenth patrol and loss ===
U-454 was sunk in the Bay of Biscay by depth charges dropped by an Australian Sunderland flying boat of No. 10 Squadron RAAF on 1 August 1943. The aircraft crashed, the U-boat was on her way to the Mediterranean when she met her fate.

Thirty-two men died; there were 14 survivors.

=== Wolfpacks ===
U-454 took part in 19 wolfpacks, namely:

- Ulan (25 December 1941 – 18 January 1942)
- Aufnahme (7 – 10 March 1942)
- Umhang (10 – 15 March 1942)
- Eiswolf (28 – 31 March 1942)
- Robbenschlag (8 – 14 April 1942)
- Blutrausch (15 – 19 April 1942)
- Wolf (13 – 30 July 1942)
- Pirat (30 July – 3 August 1942)
- Steinbrinck (3 – 11 August 1942)
- Panther (6 – 20 October 1942)
- Veilchen (20 October – 7 November 1942)
- Kreuzotter (9 – 18 November 1942)
- Landsknecht (20 – 28 January 1943)
- Pfeil (1 – 9 February 1943)
- Ritter (16 – 23 February 1943)
- Amsel (26 April – 3 May 1943)
- Amsel 4 (3 – 6 May 1943)
- Rhein (7 – 10 May 1943)
- Elbe 2 (10 – 14 May 1943)

== Summary of raiding history ==
Date	Ship Name	Nationality	Tonnage (Note: Merchant ship tonnages are in gross register tons. Military vessels are listed by tons displacement.)	Fate
17 January 1942	Harmatris	United Kingdom	5,395	Damaged
17 January 1942	HMS Matabele	Royal Navy	1,870	Sunk
17 January 1942	RT-68 Enisej	Soviet Navy	557	Sunk

== Bibliography ==
- Busch, Rainer; Röll, Hans-Joachim (1999). German U-boat commanders of World War II : a biographical dictionary. Translated by Brooks, Geoffrey. London, Annapolis, Md: Greenhill Books, Naval Institute Press. ISBN 1-55750-186-6.
- Busch, Rainer; Röll, Hans-Joachim (1999). Deutsche U-Boot-Verluste von September 1939 bis Mai 1945 [German U-boat losses from September 1939 to May 1945]. Der U-Boot-Krieg (in German). Vol. IV. Hamburg, Berlin, Bonn: Mittler. ISBN 3-8132-0514-2.
- Gröner, Erich; Jung, Dieter; Maass, Martin (1991). U-boats and Mine Warfare Vessels. German Warships 1815–1945. Vol. 2. Translated by Thomas, Keith; Magowan, Rachel. London: Conway Maritime Press. ISBN 0-85177-593-4.
- Kemp, Paul (1999). U-Boats Destroyed – German Submarine Losses in the World Wars. London: Arms & Armour. ISBN 1-85409-515-3.
