= King George V-class battleship (1939) =

1939 class of battleships of the Royal Navy

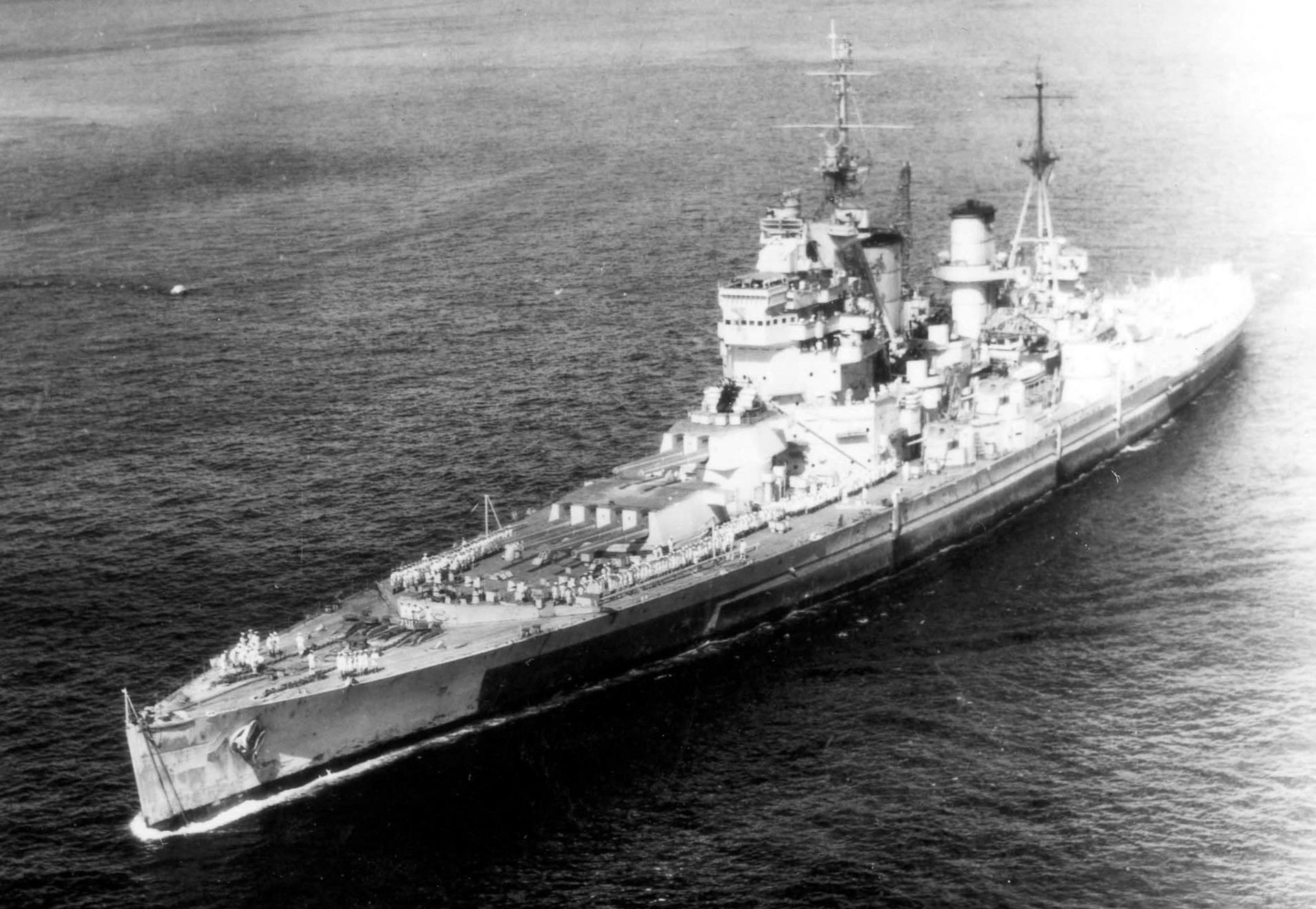
- HMS King George V in 1945

Class overview
- Name: King George V-class battleship
- Builders: Cammell Laird; Fairfield Shipbuilding and Engineering; John Brown & Co.; Swan, Hunter & Wigham Richardson; Vickers Armstrongs
- Operators: Royal Navy
- Preceded by: Nelson class
- Succeeded by: Lion class (planned); HMS Vanguard (actual)
- Built: 1937–1940
- In commission: 1940–1951
- Completed: 5
- Lost: 1
- Scrapped: 4

General characteristics
- Type: Fast battleship
- Displacement: 36,727–40,000 long tons (37,316–40,642 t) (standard)
- Length: 745 ft 1 in (227.1 m) (o/a); 700 ft 1 in (213.4 m) (between perpendiculars)
- Beam: 103 ft 2.5 in (31.5 m)
- Draught: 33 ft 7.5 in (10.2 m)
- Installed power: 8 Admiralty 3-drum boilers; 110,000 shp (82,000 kW)
- Propulsion: 4 shafts; 4 geared steam turbine sets
- Speed: 28 knots (52 km/h; 32 mph)
- Range: 14,000 nmi (26,000 km; 16,000 mi) at 10 knots (19 km/h; 12 mph)
- Complement: 1422 (1941)
- Sensors & processing systems: Type 281 early-warning radar; Type 273 surface-search radar; Type 284 gunnery radar; 4 × Type 285 gunnery radar; 6 × Type 282 gunnery radar
- Armament: 2 × quadruple, 1 × twin 14 in (356 mm) guns; 8 × twin 5.25 in (133 mm) DP guns; 4–6 × octuple 2 pdr 40 mm (1.6 in) AA guns; 2 × quadruple, 2 x single 40 mm (1.6 in) Bofors AA guns; 36 × 20 mm (0.8 in) Oerlikon AA guns (1945)
- Armour: Main Belt: 14.7 in (373 mm); Lower belt: 5.4 in (137 mm); Deck: 4.88–5.88 in (124–149 mm); Main gun turrets: 12.75 in (324 mm); Barbettes: 12.75 in (324 mm)
- Aircraft carried: 4 × Supermarine Walrus seaplanes
- Aviation facilities: 1 × catapult (removed early 1944)

The King George V-class battleships were the most modern British battleships in commission during the Second World War. Five ships of this class were built: HMS King George V (commissioned 1940), HMS Prince of Wales (1941), HMS Duke of York (1941), HMS Anson (1942) and HMS Howe (1942). The names honoured King George V, and his sons, Edward VIII, who had been Prince of Wales, and George VI who was Duke of York before ascending to the throne; the final two ships of the class were named after prominent 18th century admirals of the Royal Navy.

The Washington Naval Treaty of 1922 limited all of the number, displacement, and armament of warships built following its ratification, and this was extended by the First London Naval Treaty but these treaties were due to expire in 1936. With increased tension between Britain, the United States, Japan, France and Italy, it was supposed by the designers of these battleships that the treaty might not be renewed and the ships of the King George V class were designed with this possibility in mind.

All five ships saw combat during World War II, with King George V and Prince of Wales being involved in the action on 24 May to 27 May 1941 that resulted in the German battleship Bismarck being sunk. Following this, on 25 October 1941, Prince of Wales was sent to Singapore, arriving on 2 December and becoming the flagship of Force Z. On 10 December, Prince of Wales was attacked by Japanese bombers and sank with the loss of 327 of its men. In the aftermath of the sinking, King George V, Duke of York, Howe and Anson provided escort duty to convoys bound for the Soviet Union. On 1 May 1942, King George V collided with the destroyer HMS Punjabi, resulting in King George V being sent to Gladstone docks for repairs on 9 May, before returning to escort duty on 1 July 1942; Punjabi was sunk with 49 dead. In October 1942 Duke of York was sent to Gibraltar as the new flagship of Force H and supported the Allied landings in North Africa in November. Anson and Howe would also provide cover for multiple convoys bound for the Soviet Union from late 1942 until 1 March 1943, when Howe provided convoy cover for the last time. In May 1943 King George V and Howe were moved to Gibraltar in preparation for Operation Husky. The two ships bombarded Trapani naval base and Favignana on 11–12 July and also provided cover for Operation Avalanche on 7 to 14 September. During this time, Duke of York and Anson participated in Operation Gearbox, which was designed to draw attention away from Operation Husky. Duke of York was also instrumental in sinking the German battleship Scharnhorst on 26 December 1943. This battle was also the last time that British and German capital ships fought each other.

In late March 1945, King George V and Howe were sent to the Pacific with other Royal Navy vessels as a separate group to function with the US Navy's Task Force 57. On 4 May 1945, King George V and Howe led a forty-five-minute bombardment of Japanese air facilities in the Ryukyu Islands. King George V fired her guns in anger for the last time in a night bombardment of Hamamatsu on 29 and 30 July 1945. Duke of York and Anson were also dispatched to the Pacific, but arrived too late to participate in hostilities. On 15 August Duke of York and Anson accepted the surrender of Japanese forces occupying Hong Kong and, along with King George V, were present for the official Japanese surrender in Tokyo Bay. Following the end of World War II, the ships were phased out of service and by 1957 all of the ships had been sold off for scrap, a process that was completed by 1958.

== Design and description ==
Design of the King George V class began in 1928. Under the terms of the Washington Naval Treaty of 1922, a "holiday" from building capital ships was in force until 1931. The battleships of the British Navy consisted of only those old battleships that had been kept after the end of the First World War, plus the two new, albeit slow, Nelson-class battleships. In 1928, the Royal Navy started considering the requirements for the warships that it expected to start building in 1931.

The First London Naval Treaty of 1930 extended the "shipbuilding holiday" to 1937. Planning began again in 1935, drawing on previous work. The new class would be built up to the Treaty maximum displacement of 35,000 long tons (36,000 t). Alternatives with 16-inch (406 mm), 15-inch (381 mm), and 14-inch (356 mm) main guns were considered and the 15-inch (381 mm) armament was chosen. Most designs were intended to steam at 27 kn (50 km/h; 31 mph) with full power, and it was decided that the likely decisive range in a battle would be from 12,000 to 16,000 yd (11,000 to 15,000 m). Armour and torpedo protection formed a much greater portion of the design than that of the previous Royal Navy battleships.

In October 1935, the decision was made to use 14-inch (356 mm) guns. The United Kingdom was negotiating for a continuation of the Naval Treaties with the other parties of the London Treaty. The British Government favoured a reduction in the maximum calibre of battleship gun to 14-inch (356 mm) and in early October, the government learned that the United States would support this position if the Japanese could also be persuaded to do so. Since the large naval guns needed to be ordered by the end of the year, the British Admiralty decided on these guns for the King George V class. The Second London Naval Treaty, a result of the Second London Naval Conference begun in December 1935, was signed in March 1936 by the United States, France and Britain and this set a main battery of 14-inch (356 mm) naval guns as the limit.

=== Propulsion ===
The King George Vs were the first British battleships to alternate engine rooms and boilers in the machinery spaces, which reduced the likelihood of one hit causing the loss of all power. The machinery was arranged in four engine (turbine) rooms and four boiler rooms, with the eight machinery compartments alternating in pairs of engine or boiler rooms. Each pair of boiler rooms formed a unit with a pair of engine rooms. Nominal full power was 110,000 shp (82,000 kW) with 400 psi (28 kg/cm^{2}; 2,800 kPa) steam at 700 °F (371 °C). The machinery was designed to operate at an overload power of 125,000 shp (93,000 kW) and Prince of Wales' "...main machinery steamed at overload powers of 128,000 to 134,000 shp (95,000 to 100,000 kW) with no difficulties..." during the hunt for the Bismarck. The Admiralty 3-drum boilers operated very efficiently, and similar boilers of nearly identical power, fitted to the older battleship Warspite during her rebuilding in 1937 achieved a full-power specific fuel consumption of 0.748 lb per shp on trials which compared favourably with contemporary battleships. (Note: Full-power specific fuel consumption is a measure of power plant efficiency. It is calculated by dividing fuel consumption in pounds per hour, into the shaft horsepower produced by the turbines.) During her full-power trials on 10 December 1940, King George V at 41,630 long tons (42,300 t) displacement achieved 28 kn (52 km/h; 32 mph) with 111,700 shp (83,300 kW) at 230 rpm and a specific fuel consumption of 0.715 lb per shp.

King George V had her paravanes streamed during her full power trials, which caused an estimated .7 knot loss of speed. The Duke of York at her trials, on 1 November 1941, displacing 42,970 long tons (43,660 t) (sea slight, wind moderate), attained a speed of 20.6 kn (38.2 km/h; 23.7 mph) at 115 rpm and 28,720 shp (21,420 kW) and 28.6 kn (53.0 km/h; 32.9 mph) at 232 rpm and 111,200 shp (82,900 kW). After 1942 the Royal Navy was forced to use fuel oils with considerably higher viscosity and greater seawater content than these boilers could efficiently use. The poor quality of the oil fuel combined with the seawater contamination reduced the efficiency of the steam power plant and increased the maintenance required. By 1944 the specific full-power fuel consumption had increased to 0.8 lb per shp, and boiler maintenance was becoming increasingly difficult. The Admiralty had been aware of this problem and were designing new types of oil sprayers and burners that could burn fuel oil much more efficiently, and sometime after 1944, Duke of York and Anson were fitted with new, higher-pressure oil sprayers and burners that restored the boilers to full efficiency. The same oil sprayers and burners were used in HMS Vanguard along with other detail improvements so that Vanguard achieved a full-power specific fuel consumption of 0.63 lb per shp while using the same steam pressures and temperatures as used on the King George V class.

=== Protection ===
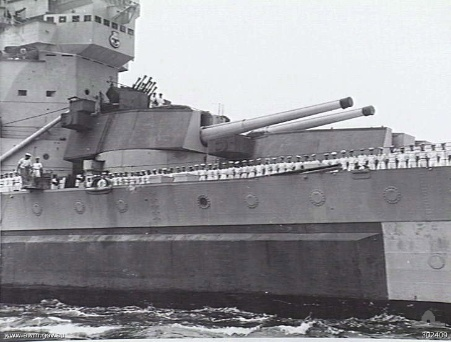
The external vertical armour belt is clearly visible here on Howe

The armour protection of the King George V-class battleships was designed after consideration of the Royal Navy's experience of the First World War and upon testing between the wars. The design of this class was dominated by the provision of protection. Magazine protection was given priority with a thick belt and deck armour and by placing the magazines at the lowest levels of the ship.

The horizontal protection over the magazines consisted of three layers with a total thickness of 9.13 in (232 mm); the weather deck consisted of 1.25 in (32 mm) of Ducol (D) steel, the main armoured deck was of non-cemented steel armour 5.88 in (149 mm) thick over a 0.5 in (13 mm) D steel deck and above the shell rooms there was another 1.5-inch splinter deck. (Note: Ducol steel was an extra-high-strength silicon-manganese high-tensile construction steel developed in the 1920s. It had very good armour properties and was used extensively on the King George V-class battleships as a support for deck and belt armour and for hull, deck and splinter-proof plating.) The powder magazines were below the shell rooms for added protection, a practice that was begun with the Nelson-class battleships. The weather deck thickness was the same over the machinery spaces but there the main armoured deck was reduced to 4.88 in (124 mm) over a 0.5 in (13 mm) D steel deck. The main armoured deck was continued forward of the forward armoured bulkhead and gradually reduced from full thickness to 2.5 in (64 mm), while aft of the after magazines an armoured turtle-back deck covered the steering gear with 4.5–5 in (110–130 mm) of armour whilst also providing protection along the waterline.

The main armour belt was 23.5 feet (7.2 m) high and covered the hull side from the main armoured deck to finish 15 feet (4.6 m) below the deep waterline. Post-World War I studies had indicated that it was possible for delayed-action AP shells to dive under a shallow belt and penetrate into vital areas of the ship and therefore the main belt was made to extend as far below the waterline as possible. Along the ship, the belt started just forward of the forward turret and finished just aft of the aft turret. The armour consisted of three equal-depth strakes. The strakes were tongue-and-grooved together, and each individual plate in a strake was keyed into neighbouring plates. The belt was at its thickest above and at the waterline. Most secondary and some primary sources describe the maximum thickness of the belt armour varying between 14.7 and 15 inches (due to the practice of indicating plate thicknesses on weight (at 40 lbs per inch of square foot of armour), as opposed to nominal thickness in inches) Some sources give more detail: along the magazines, the belt was 14.7 inches thick (373 mm) cemented armour, laminated onto 1 inch (25.4 mm) of "composition material" (cement) and an additional 0.875 inch (22.2 mm) of Ducol steel hull plating (this steel was also effective as armour), over the machinery spaces, the belt was 13.7 inches (349 mm). The lower section of belt tapered to a thickness of between 4.5 in and 5.5 in. Armour protection was even better than the thickness of armour would indicate due to the improved qualities of the British cemented (Note: face hardened) armour which provided excellent resistance. The armoured belt, together with armoured bulkheads fore and aft and the armoured main deck, formed an "armoured citadel" protecting magazines and machinery. The armoured bulkhead was 12 in (305 mm) thick forward and 10 in (254 mm) thick at the after end of the citadel The main armoured belt extended forward and aft of the main armoured bulkheads with reduced height to protect the waterline and gradually reduced in thickness from 13 to 5.5 inches. Immune zone calculations vary widely from source to source. The armour provision was designed to offer protection from guns of a greater calibre than the class mounted themselves, and was on a scale second to none at the time the ships were designed. Indeed, the armour protection of these vessels was to be subsequently exceeded only by the Japanese battleships of the Yamato class.

The main gun turrets were relatively lightly protected in comparison to contemporary battleships. Extensive levels of flash protection were employed. Maximum turret and barbette armour was reduced to 12.75 inches in this class from the 16 inches of the Nelson class. The turret faces had 12.75 in (324 mm) of armour at the front; 8.84 inches (225 mm) sides (at the gun chamber); 6.86 inches (284–174 mm) on the sides and rear; the roof plate was 5.88 in (149 mm) thick. The main armament barbettes were of varying thickness: 12.75 in (324 mm) thick on the sides, 11.76 in (298 mm) forward and 10.82 in (275 mm) aft of the turret. To some extent the higher quality of the armour minimised the loss of protection and the turret's flat face improved ballistic resistance at long ranges, while the low profile of the turret minimised target area at closer ranges. The reduction in turret and barbette armour was a compromise in favour of the thickest possible protection for the magazines. The extensive anti-flash protection in the turrets and barbettes was designed to ensure that the magazines would remain safe even if the turrets and/or barbettes were penetrated. The secondary gun mounts, casements and handling rooms received only light plating of 0.98 in (25 mm) to protect against splinters.

Unlike contemporary foreign battleships and the preceding Nelson-class battleships, the King George V class had comparatively light conning tower protection with 4-inch (102 mm) sides, 3 in (75 mm) forward and aft and a 1.47 in (38 mm) roof plate. The RN's analysis of World War I revealed that command personnel were unlikely to use an armoured conning tower, preferring the superior visibility of unarmoured bridge positions. Stability and weight considerations clearly played an important part in the British decision to limit superstructure armour. The conning tower armour was sufficient to protect against smaller ship guns and shell fragments.

==== Underwater protection ====
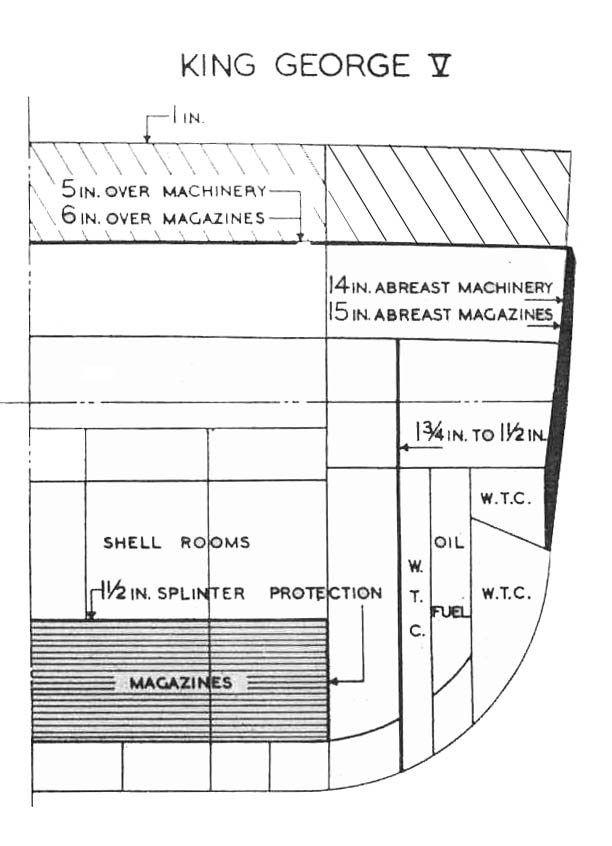
Armour and underwater protection of King George V

The hull below the waterline, along the main armour belt, formed the side protection system (SPS). It was subdivided into a series of longitudinal compartments in a void-liquid-void layout; the outer and inner were filled with air, and the middle compartment with liquid (fuel or water). The outer hull plating in the region of the SPS was thin to reduce potential splinter damage from a torpedo. The outer compartment of the SPS was normally an empty or 'void' space (containing only air) and this allowed the initial explosion from a torpedo to expand while minimising damage to the ship. The centre compartment was filled with oil or seawater and this spread the pressure pulse over a larger area while the liquid contained any metal splinters that were created from the torpedo explosion. The inboard compartment was another void space and served to contain any liquid leaking from the liquid layer and any remaining pressure pulse from the torpedo explosion.

Inboard of the final void space was an armoured bulkhead which varied in thickness from 1.5 in (37 mm) over the machinery spaces to 1.75 inch (44 mm) abreast of the magazines. This bulkhead formed the "holding bulkhead" and it was designed to resist the residual blast effects from the torpedo hit. If this final inner bulkhead was penetrated a further set of subdivided compartments would contain any leaks; inboard of the holding bulkhead the ship was highly subdivided into small compartments containing auxiliary machinery spaces. The SPS void-liquid-void layer was generally about 13 feet wide, and the auxiliary machinery spaces added approximately another 8 feet of space from the outer hull plating to the major machinery spaces. The only exception to this was abreast A and B Engine Rooms, where the auxiliary machinery spaces were omitted, but another void space, about three feet wide was substituted in its place.

Above the SPS, and directly behind the armour belt, was a series of compartments, typically used for washrooms or storage spaces, which were designed to allow for upward venting of over-pressure from a torpedo hit. This scheme was designed to protect against a 1000 lb warhead, and had been tested and found effective in full-scale trials. The SPS was also a key component of the ship's damage control system, as lists resulting from flooding could be corrected by counterflooding empty void spaces, and/or draining normally liquid filled compartments. In the case of the loss of the Prince of Wales these spaces were used for counterflooding to reduce list.

HMS Prince of Wales was sunk on 10 December 1941, from what was believed to have been hits by six aerial launched torpedoes and a 500 kg bomb. However, an extensive 2007 survey by divers of the wreck of Prince of Wales determined definitively that there had been only four torpedo hits. Three of these four hits had struck the hull outside the area protected by the SPS. In the case of the fourth, the SPS holding bulkhead appeared intact abreast the area where the hull was hit.

The conclusion of the subsequent 2009 paper and analysis was that the primary cause of the sinking was uncontained flooding along "B" propeller shaft. (Note: B was the outermost shaft on the port side) The propeller shaft external shaft bracket failed, and the movement of the unsupported shaft then tore up the bulkheads all the way from the external propeller shaft gland through to B Engine Room itself. This allowed flooding into the primary machinery spaces. The damage and flooding was exacerbated by poor damage control and the premature abandonment of the after magazines and a telephone communications switchboard. "B" propeller shaft had been stopped, and then restarted several minutes after being struck by a torpedo. Subsequent inquiries into her loss at the time identified the need for a number of design improvements, which were implemented to a lesser or greater degree on the other four ships of the class. Ventilation and the watertightness of the ventilation system were improved, while internal passageways within the machinery spaces were redesigned and the communications system made more robust.

Improved propeller shaft glands and shaft locking gear were introduced. Some of the supposed failures of the ship were nevertheless predicated on the assumption that a torpedo had hit and defeated the SPS at or about frame 206 at the same time as the hit that damaged B propeller shaft. The 2007 survey's video footage evidence showed however that the hull is basically intact in this area.

The inability to survey the wreck during the war no doubt frustrated efforts to arrive at a definitive cause for the loss of Prince of Wales and, subsequently, that somewhat flawed analysis has led to a number of incorrect theories regarding the reasons for the sinking being inadvertently disseminated over the years.

On examination of the Prince of Wales after her encounter with the German battleship Bismarck and the heavy cruiser Prinz Eugen, three damaging hits were discovered which had caused about 400 tons of water, from all three hits, to enter the ship.

One of these hits, fired from Bismarck, had penetrated the torpedo protection outer bulkhead in a region very close to an auxiliary machinery space causing local flooding within the SPS, while the inner, 1.5-inch (2×19 mm) D-steel holding bulkhead remained intact, as the German shell was a dud. The German shell would have actually exploded in the water if its fuse had worked properly, due to the depth which the shell had to dive before striking the Prince of Wales under her armoured belt.

=== Armament ===
==== Main armament ====
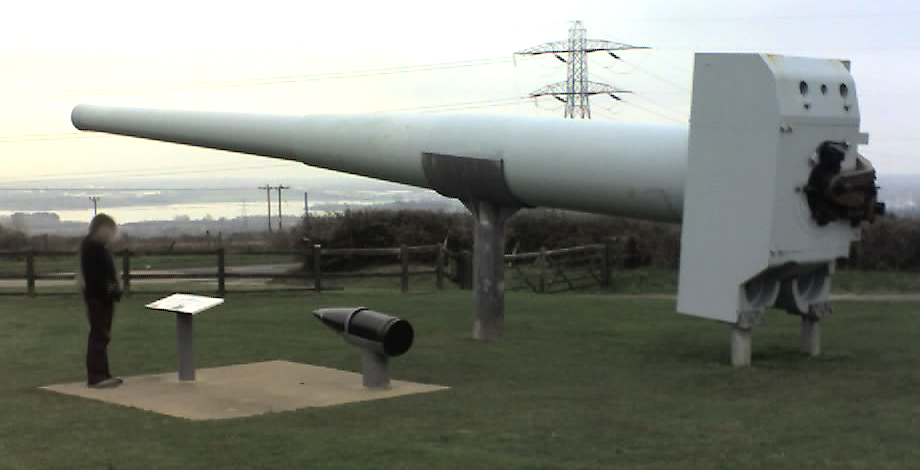
British 14-inch naval gun as used on King George V-class battleships. This example, never installed, is now on display at the Royal Armoury Fort Nelson, Hampshire, UK

The King George V class carried ten BL 14 inch Mk VII naval guns, in two quadruple turrets fore and aft and a single twin turret superfiring over the fore turret. There was debate within the Admiralty over the choice of gun calibre. There was a routine debate in the Admiralty over gun size, armour, speed, torpedo protection and AA firepower and the correct ratio between these attributes for the King George V battleships; other European powers preferred 15-inch and the US 16-inch main guns. The Admiralty chose a ship with high speed, enhanced protection, heavy AA and ten 14-inch guns. The Admiralty controller wrote that a change to 15-inch guns would entail an 18-month delay (which would have meant no new RN battleships until 1942). Stephen Roskill noted that the London Naval Treaty stipulated a 14-inch maximum gun size, with an opt out clause, which Britain was very reluctant to exercise, since the Admiralty was hoping to persuade the other naval powers to stick to 14-inch guns, though there was little or no debate within Parliament. The Admiralty studied vessels armed with a variety of main armaments including nine 15-inch (381 mm) guns in three turrets, two forward and one aft. While this was well within the capability of British shipyards, the design was quickly rejected as they felt compelled to adhere to the Second London Naval Treaty of 1936 and there was a serious shortage of skilled technicians and ordnance designers, along with compelling pressures to reduce weight.

The class was designed to carry twelve 14-inch guns in three quadruple turrets and this configuration had a heavier broadside than the nine 15-inch guns. It proved impossible to include this amount of firepower and the desired level of protection on a 35,000 ton displacement and the weight of the superimposed quadruple turret made the stability of the vessel questionable. The second forward turret was changed to a smaller two-gun turret in exchange for better armour protection, reducing the broadside weight to below that of the nine gun arrangement. The 14-inch Armour Piercing (AP) shell also carried a proportionally large bursting charge of 39.8 lb (18.1 kg). The armour-piercing capability of the gun and its ammunition is exhibited by the conning tower on the wreck of the German battleship Bismarck, provided with 14-inch thick armour, which is said to resemble a "Swiss cheese". The last naval treaty had an escalator clause that permitted a change to 16-inch guns if another signatory did not conform to it by 1 January 1937. Although they could have invoked this clause, the effect would have been to delay construction and it was considered prudent to build with 14-inch rather than find themselves without the new battleships. The US opted to absorb a delay and built its ships with larger guns. When comparing the British 14-inch gun to the heavier guns mounted on contemporary foreign battleships, the thicker armour of the British battleships tended to result in an equalisation of the relative penetrating power of respective shells.

In service, the quad turrets proved to be less reliable than was hoped for. Wartime haste in building, insufficient clearance between the rotating and fixed structure of the turret, insufficient full calibre firing exercises and extensive arrangements to prevent flash from reaching the magazines made it mechanically complex, leading to problems during prolonged actions. In order to bring ammunition into the turret at any degree of train, the design included a transfer ring between the magazine and turret; this did not have sufficient clearance to allow for the ship bending and flexing. Improved clearances, improved mechanical linkages, and better training led to greater reliability in the quadruple turrets but they remained problematic.

During the battle of the Denmark Strait against the German battleship Bismarck, the main battery of the newly commissioned Prince of Wales had mechanical problems: it started to fire three-round salvos instead of five-round salvoes, and there were problems in all except for the twin 'B' turret. The main battery output was reduced to 74 per cent (Bismarck and Prinz Eugen achieved 89% and 85% output, respectively) during the engagement, as out of seventy-four rounds ordered fired, only fifty-five were possible. 'A' turret was taking in water leading to discomfort for its crew and 'Y' turret jammed at salvo 20. The number of known defects in the main armament that was hampering 14-inch fire, the damage sustained and the worsening tactical situation forced Captain Leach to disengage from combat. With the range down to 14,500 yards and with five of his 14-inch guns out of action, Leach decided to break off his engagement with a superior enemy. Stephen Roskill in the War at Sea (the official British history of the Second World War at sea), Volume 1, describes the decision to turn away: "In addition to the defective gun in her forward turret, another 4-gun turret was temporarily incapacitated by mechanical breakdowns. In these circumstances Leach decided to break off the action and, at 0613, turned away under cover of smoke." During the later action with Bismarck, HMS King George V was also having trouble with her main battery, and by 09:27 every gun missed at least one salvo due to failures in the safety interlocks for antiflash protection. John Roberts wrote of main gunnery problems encountered by King George V:

Initially King George V did well achieving 1.7 salvoes per minute while employing radar control but she began to suffer severe problems from 09:20 onward [Note: KGV had opened fire at 08:48 and fired for about 25 minutes at 1.7 salvoes per minute until 09:13, when the Type 284 radar broke down, but with no recorded loss of 14-inch gun output until 09:20.]. 'A' turret was completely out of action for 30 minutes after firing about 23 rounds per gun, due to a jam between the fixed and revolving structure in the shell room and 'Y' turret was out of action for 7 minutes due to drill errors... Both guns in B turret, guns 2 and 4 in 'A' turret and gun 2 in 'Y' turret were put out of action by jams and remained so until after the action – 5 guns out of 10! There were a multitude of other problems with mechanical failures and drill errors that caused delays and missed salvos. There were also some misfires – one gun (3 of 'A' turret) misfired twice and was out of action for 30 minutes before it was considered safe to open the breech.

During the early part of her action against the German capital ship Scharnhorst at the Battle of the North Cape on 26 December 1943, Duke of York, firing under radar control in poor weather, scored 31 straddles out of 52 broadsides fired and during the latter part she scored 21 straddles out of 25 broadsides, a very creditable gunnery performance. In total, Duke of York fired 450 shells in 77 broadsides. "However, Duke of York still fired less than 70% of her possible output during this battle because of mechanical and "errors in drill" problems."

The King George Vs were the only battleships designed for the Royal Navy to use 14-inch guns and turrets. (HMS Canada, originally designed for Chile, had used 14-inch guns during the First World War.)

==== Secondary armament ====
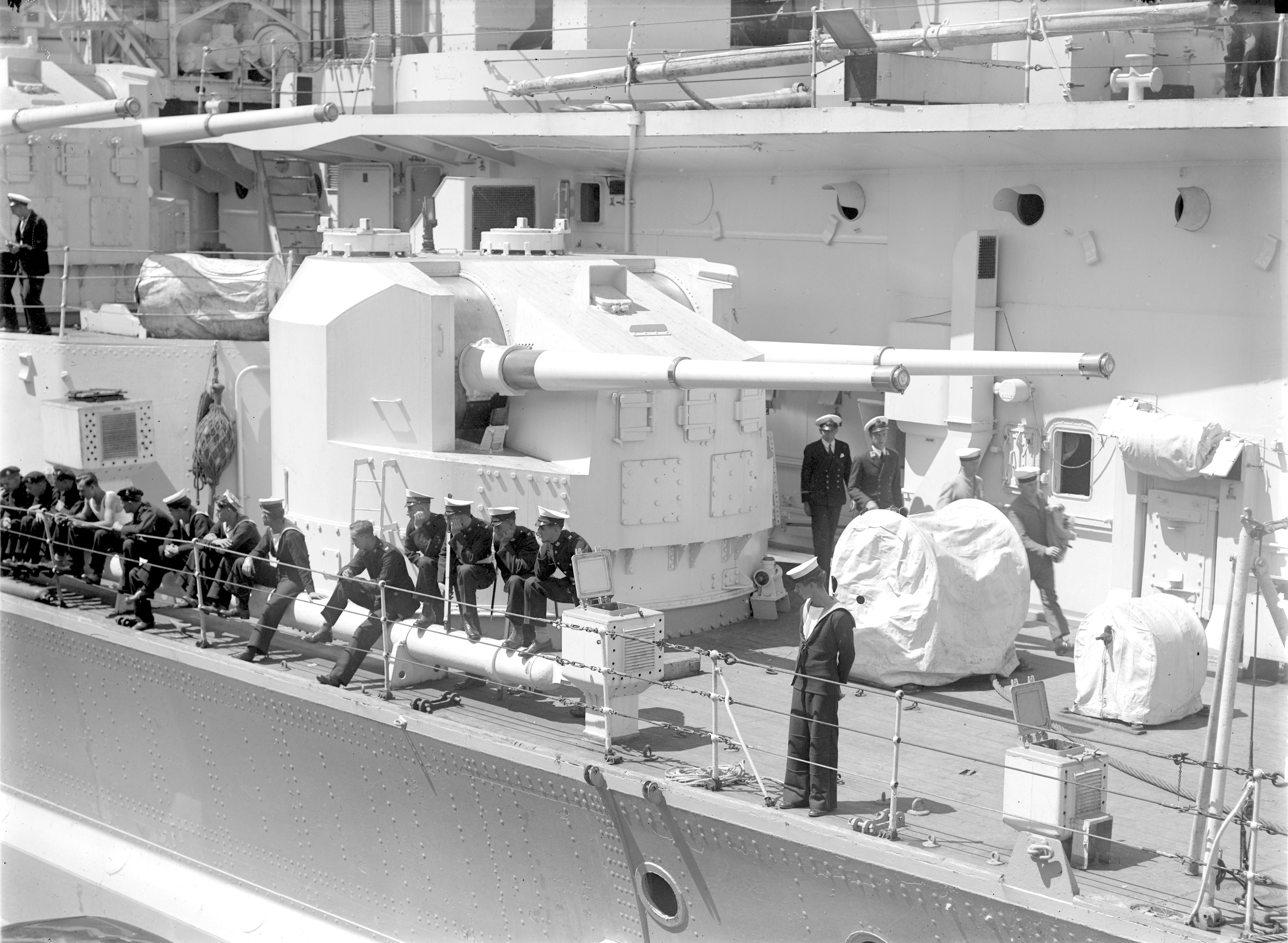
5.25-inch dual-purpose turret of King George V

The QF 5.25 inch Mark I dual-purpose gun has been dogged with controversy as well. The RN Gunnery Pocket Book published in 1945 states that: "The maximum rate of fire should be 10–12 rounds per minute." Wartime experience revealed that the maximum weight which the loading numbers could handle comfortably was much lower than 80–90 lb and the weight of the 5.25-inch ammunition caused serious difficulties, allowing them to manage only 7–8 rpm instead of the designed 10–12 rpm. The mount had a maximum elevation of +70 degrees and the slow elevating and training speeds of the mounts were inadequate for engaging modern high-speed aircraft. Despite this Prince of Wales was credited with several 5.25-inch kills during Operation Halberd and damaged 10 of 16 high-level bombers in two formations during her last engagement, two of which crash landed. Anson had her 5.25-inch turrets upgraded to RP10 control which increased training and elevating speeds to 20 degrees per second. (Note: Unmodified the training speed was 10 degrees per second.) These ships were equipped with the HACS AA fire control system and the Admiralty Fire Control clock for surface fire control of the secondary armament.

==== Anti-aircraft battery ====
The King George V-class design had four 0.5-inch quadruple machine gun mounts but in 1939 these were replaced by two Mark VI pom-poms. In 1940, to combat air attack, four Unrotated Projectile (rocket) mountings were fitted, one on "B" turret, two on "Y" turret and one replacing a pom-pom mount added in 1939 at the stern. The pom-poms in King George V were designed and produced by Vickers Armstrongs, as a result of a post-World War I requirement for a multiple mounting which was effective against close-range bombers or torpedo planes. The first model, tested in 1927, was a very advanced weapon for its time and in 1938 the Mark VI* had a muzzle velocity of 2,400 feet per second, a 1.6-inch bore and a barrel length of 40 calibres. The pom-poms fired 1.8-pound shells at a rate of 96–98 rounds per minute for controlled fire and 115 rounds per minute for automatic fire. The range of the Mark VI* was 6,800 yards, at a muzzle velocity of 2,300 feet per second. The Mark VI octuple mount weighed 16 tons and the Mark VII quadruple mount weighed 10.8 tons if power operated; it could be elevated to 80 degrees and depressed to 10 degrees at a rate of 25 degrees per second, which was also the rate of train. The normal ammunition supply on board for the Mark VI was 1,800 rounds per barrel. King George V introduced the Mk IV Pom-pom director to the Royal Navy in 1940, becoming the first ship in the world to feature gyroscopic target tracking in tachymetric anti-aircraft directors. The anti-aircraft battery of these ships was incrementally augmented throughout the war. The number and disposition of guns varying from ship to ship, King George V in September 1945 carrying: 8 Mark VI octuple pom-poms, 2 quadruple 40 mm Bofors Mk II (US), 2 single 40 mm Bofors, and 24 single 20 mm Oerlikon cannon.

==== Fire control ====
The main guns of the King George V-class ships were controlled via two director control towers, one on top of the bridge superstructure and one aft of the mainmast. Each of the control towers was equipped with 15 foot rangefinders and fed targeting information to an Admiralty Fire Control Table, Mk IX. In the event that the control towers were disabled both "A" and "Y" turrets had internal 41 foot rangefinders whilst "B" turret had 30 foot rangefinders. The first two ships of the class to be completed, King George V and Prince of Wales, carried four HACS Mk IVGB directors for the ship's secondary 5.25-inch guns as well as six Mk IV pom-pom directors; all ten of these directors featured Gyro Rate Unit, tachymetric fire control. Duke of York and Howe had HACS Mk V directors, with Anson having the Mk V directors replaced by the updated Mk VI.

== Ships ==
Construction data
Name	Namesake	Builder	Ordered	Laid down	Launched	Commissioned	Fate
King George V	HM King George V	Vickers-Armstrongs, Newcastle-Upon-Tyne	29 July 1936	1 January 1937	21 February 1939	1 October 1940	Broken up at Dalmuir, 1959
Prince of Wales (ex-King Edward VIII)	Prince of Wales	Cammell Laird, Birkenhead	29 July 1936	1 January 1937	3 May 1939	19 January 1941	Sunk in air attack in South China Sea, 10 December 1941
Duke of York (ex-Anson)	Duke of York	John Brown and Company, Clydebank	16 November 1936	5 May 1937	28 February 1940	19 August 1941	Broken up at Faslane, 1958
Anson (ex-Jellicoe)	Admiral of the Fleet George Anson, 1st Baron Anson	Swan Hunter, Wallsend	28 April 1937	20 July 1937	24 February 1940	14 April 1942	Broken up at Faslane, 1958
Howe (ex-Beatty)	Admiral of the Fleet Richard Howe, 1st Earl Howe	Fairfields, Govan	28 April 1937	1 June 1937	9 April 1940	17 June 1942	Broken up at Inverkeithing, 1958

== Service history ==
=== Battle of the Denmark Strait (actions against Bismarck) ===
King George V was the first ship of the class to join the Home Fleet on 11 December 1940 and her first action was providing distant cover for Operation Claymore in February 1941, before escorting Atlantic convoys HX 114 and HX 115 during March. Owing to the threat of the German battleship Bismarck, the Home Fleet sent King George V and the newly completed Prince of Wales on 22 May to help locate Bismarck, along with the battlecruiser HMS Hood and six destroyers. On 24 May, Prince of Wales and Hood made contact with Bismarck and opened fire at 26,000 yards. Prince of Wales' sixth salvo straddled Bismarck and it was during this salvo, and one other, that she landed two decisive hits, holing Bismarck's bow, flooding a generator room and an auxiliary boiler room, and forcing the critical shutdown of two of her boilers, which led to Bismarck making the fateful decision to attempt to return to port. During this time Bismarck and Prinz Eugen had been solely targeting Hood and at 06:01 Hood blew up and sank, with the loss of all but three of her complement of 1,419 officers and men.

Following this, Captain Leach of Prince of Wales gave the order to disengage, laying a heavy smokescreen to facilitate the retreat. Prince of Wales would attempt to reengage Bismarck on two more occasions, but was unable to land any further hits owing to the distance being in excess of 20,000 yards, and was then forced to return to Iceland for refuelling and would play no further part in actions against the German battleship. Meanwhile, King George V on 24 May was still 300 to 400 miles away from Bismarck and it was not until 27 May that King George V and HMS Rodney were able to engage Bismarck, due to a Swordfish torpedo bomber disabling Bismarck's steering gear on 26 May. During the engagement King George V and Rodney were able to relatively quickly disable the main armament turrets and fire-control systems of Bismarck, rendering her unable to effectively engage the British ships; later they closed to point-blank range. King George V opened fire at 08:48, ceased fire at 10:22, and after about 92 minutes of firing King George V had fired 335 14-inch shells at Bismarck, scoring multiple hits that contributed to Bismarck sinking soon after.

=== Sinking of Prince of Wales ===
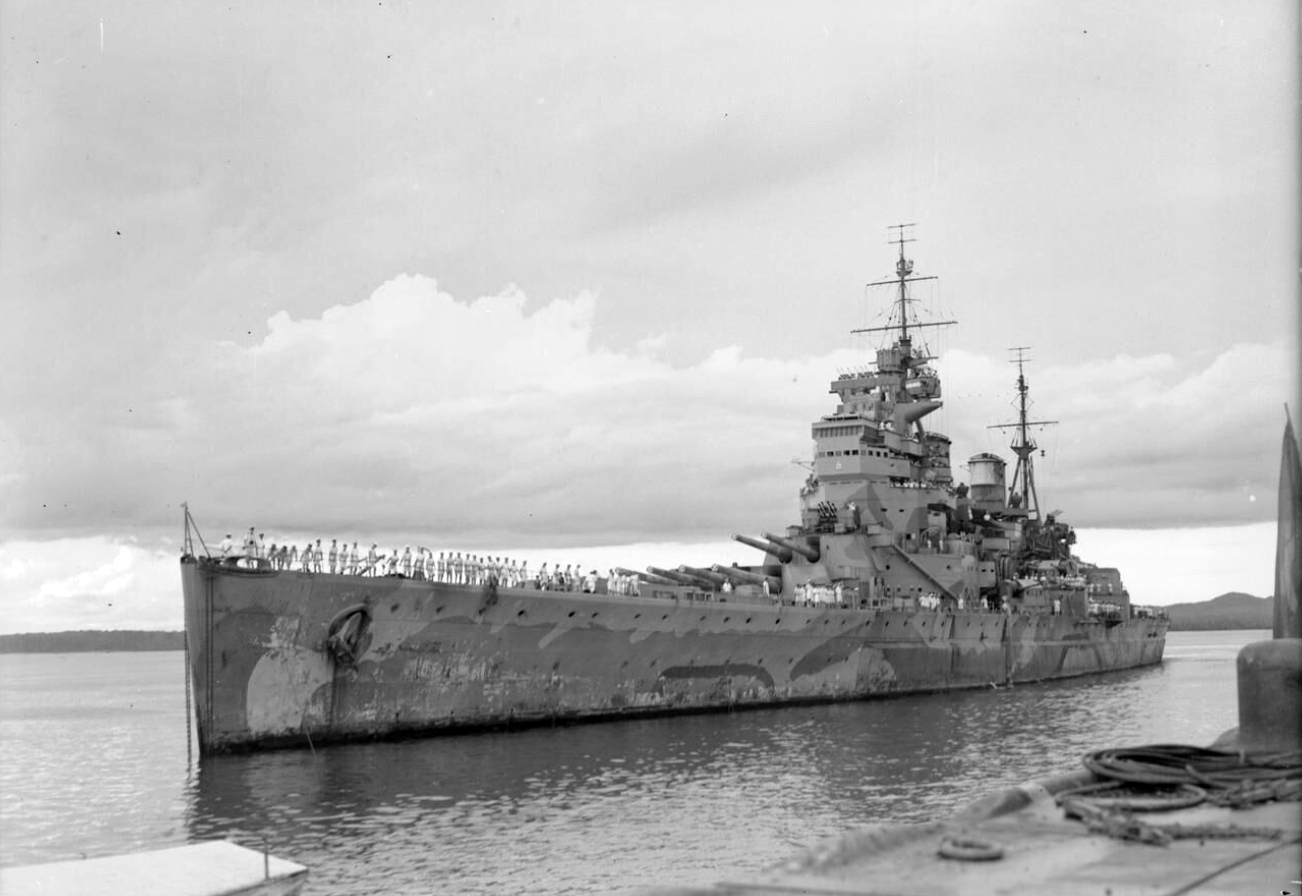
Prince of Wales

After being repaired at Rosyth, Prince of Wales transported Prime Minister Winston Churchill to Newfoundland for a conference with President Franklin D. Roosevelt, that resulted in the Atlantic Charter being declared, which laid out how the allies intended to deal with the post-war world, on 14 August 1941. Following the declaration of the charter, Prince of Wales on 24 September provided escort for Operation Halberd, with Prince of Wales downing several Italian aircraft on 27 September. On 25 October 1941, Prince of Wales departed home waters bound for Singapore, with orders to rendezvous with the battlecruiser Repulse and the aircraft carrier Indomitable; however, Indomitable ran aground in Jamaica and was unable to proceed. On 2 December the group docked in Singapore and Prince of Wales then became the flagship of the ill-fated Force Z under Admiral Sir Tom Phillips.

The force then diverted to British Malaya as they had received intelligence that Japanese forces were landing there, however, this was a diversion and on 10 December the force was spotted by a Japanese submarine. At 11:00 the first Japanese air attack began against the force and at 11:30 Prince of Wales was struck by a torpedo. This led to rapid flooding, as the port outer propeller shaft had been damaged; high-speed rotation of this unsupported propeller shaft destroyed the sealing glands around it, allowing water to pour into the hull. The ship subsequently began to take on a heavy list. Prince of Wales was hit by three more torpedoes, before a 500 kg (1100 lb) bomb hit the catapult deck, penetrating through to the main deck before exploding in the makeshift aid centre causing numerous casualties. Several other bombs from this attack were very "near misses", which indented the hull, popped rivets and caused hull plates to "split" along their seams which intensified the flooding aboard Prince of Wales. At 13:15 the order was given to abandon ship and at 13:20 Prince of Wales capsized and sank with Admiral Phillips and Captain Leach being among the 327 fatalities. The wreck lies upside down in 223 feet (68 m) of water at 3°33′36″N 104°28′42″E.

=== Convoy duty ===
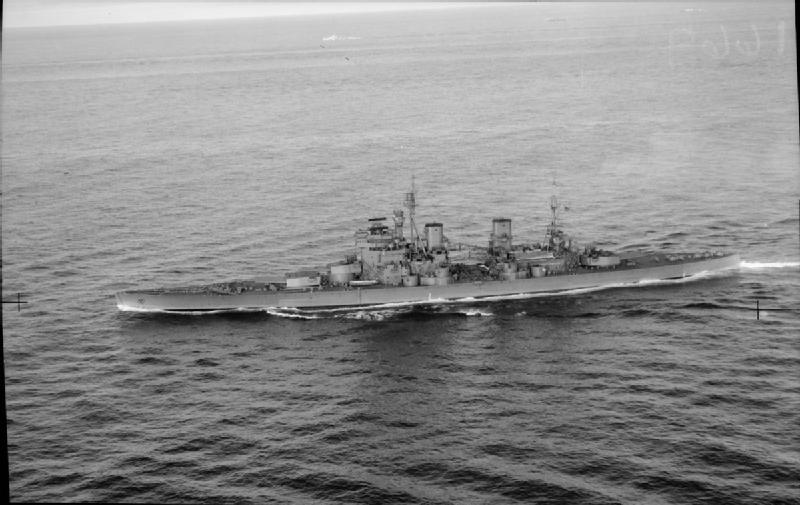
Duke of York

In October, King George V was involved in Operation EJ, which involved escorting the aircraft carrier HMS Victorious, whose aircraft attacked German shipping in the Glomfjord. Duke of York, the third ship of the class, first saw action on 1 March 1942, when she provided close escort for convoy PQ 12 and was later joined by King George V on 6 March, as Admiral John Tovey believed that the German battleship Tirpitz would attempt to intercept the convoy; however, aircraft from Victorious were able to prevent Tirpitz from leaving her base in Norway. During escort duty on 1 May 1942 King George V collided with the destroyer Punjabi, cutting Punjabi in two and damaging 40 feet of her own bow, resulting in King George V being sent to Gladstone Dock for repairs on 9 May before resuming escort duty on 1 July 1942. When the last two ships in the class, Howe and Anson, were completed in late 1942, they were assigned to provide cover for convoys bound for Russia. On 12 September, Anson was joined by Duke of York in providing distant cover for convoy QP. 14. In October, Duke Of York was sent to Gibraltar to support the Allied landings in North Africa in November. On 31 December, Howe and King George V provided distant cover for Arctic convoy RA 51.

=== Battle of the North Cape ===
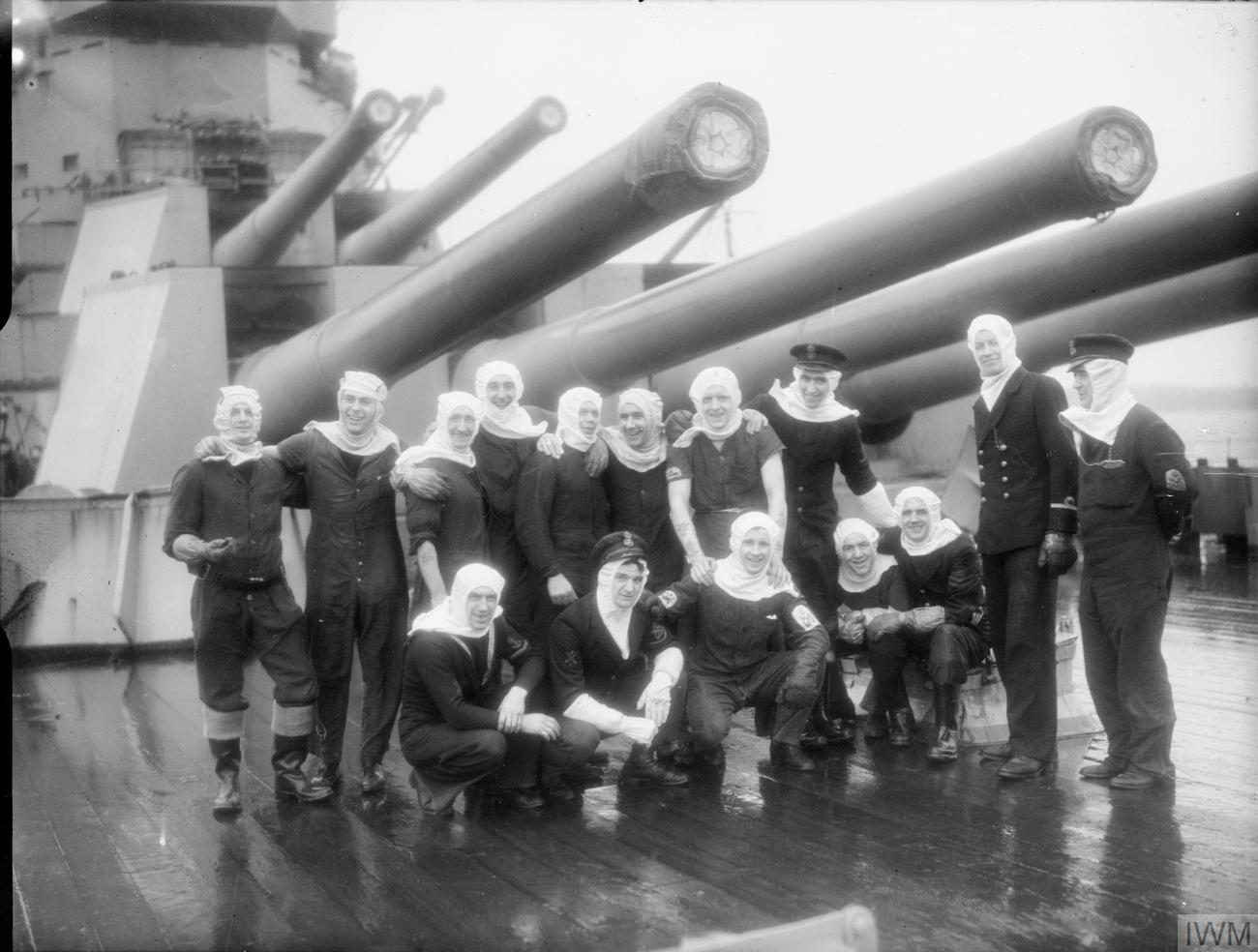
Gun crews of Duke of York under the ship's 14 inch guns at Scapa Flow after the sinking of the German battleship Scharnhorst on 26 December 1943.

Anson covered her last convoy on 29 January 1943, before being relocated, with Duke of York, to the Mediterranean. In June 1943, the two battleships took part in Operation Gearbox, which was designed to draw attention away from Operation Husky. At the same time, King George V and Howe were also relocated to the Mediterranean. They bombarded Trapani naval base on 12 July and defended Algiers against an air raid, before departing to take part in Operation Avalanche. Between 9 and 11 September they provided support for Operation Slapstick and later escorted the surrendered Italian fleet to Malta.

When the German battleship Scharnhorst was relocated to Norway, it was deemed necessary to provide more protection for all convoys bound for Russia. On 25 December, Scharnhorst was reported at sea. Initial contact was made the following day by the cruisers of Force 1 (HMS Belfast, Norfolk and Sheffield) but following a brief engagement, Scharnhorst was able to outdistance the cruisers.

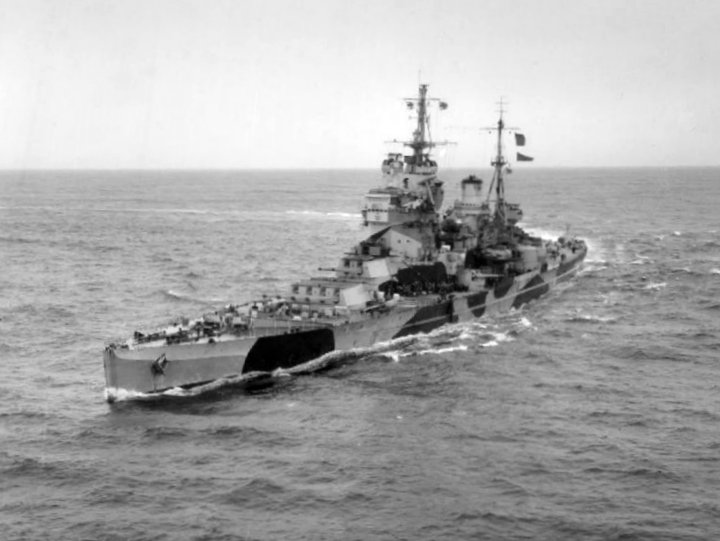
Howe

Force 2, which included Duke of York, was able to close the range and Duke of York opened fire on Scharnhorst, scoring hits at ranges in excess of 12,000 yards. Scharnhorst scored two hits upon Duke of York during the engagement, both of which hit masts and failed to explode. One of Duke of York's shells exploded in Scharnhorst's number one boiler room, slowing her significantly and allowing British destroyers to close to torpedo range. Their torpedo hits allowed Duke of York to close to a range of 10,400 yards before opening fire once again. All Scharnhorst's turrets were silenced and shortly afterwards Scharnhorst sank with the loss of over 1,700 men.

Following this, on 29 March 1944, Duke of York provided cover for convoy JW 58 and in August Duke of York and Anson provided cover for the aircraft carrier Furious, while she carried out air strikes against German targets in Norway as part of Operation Bayleaf. On 3 April, Duke of York provided cover for Operation Tungsten, which succeeded in damaging the German battleship Tirpitz.

=== Far East deployment ===
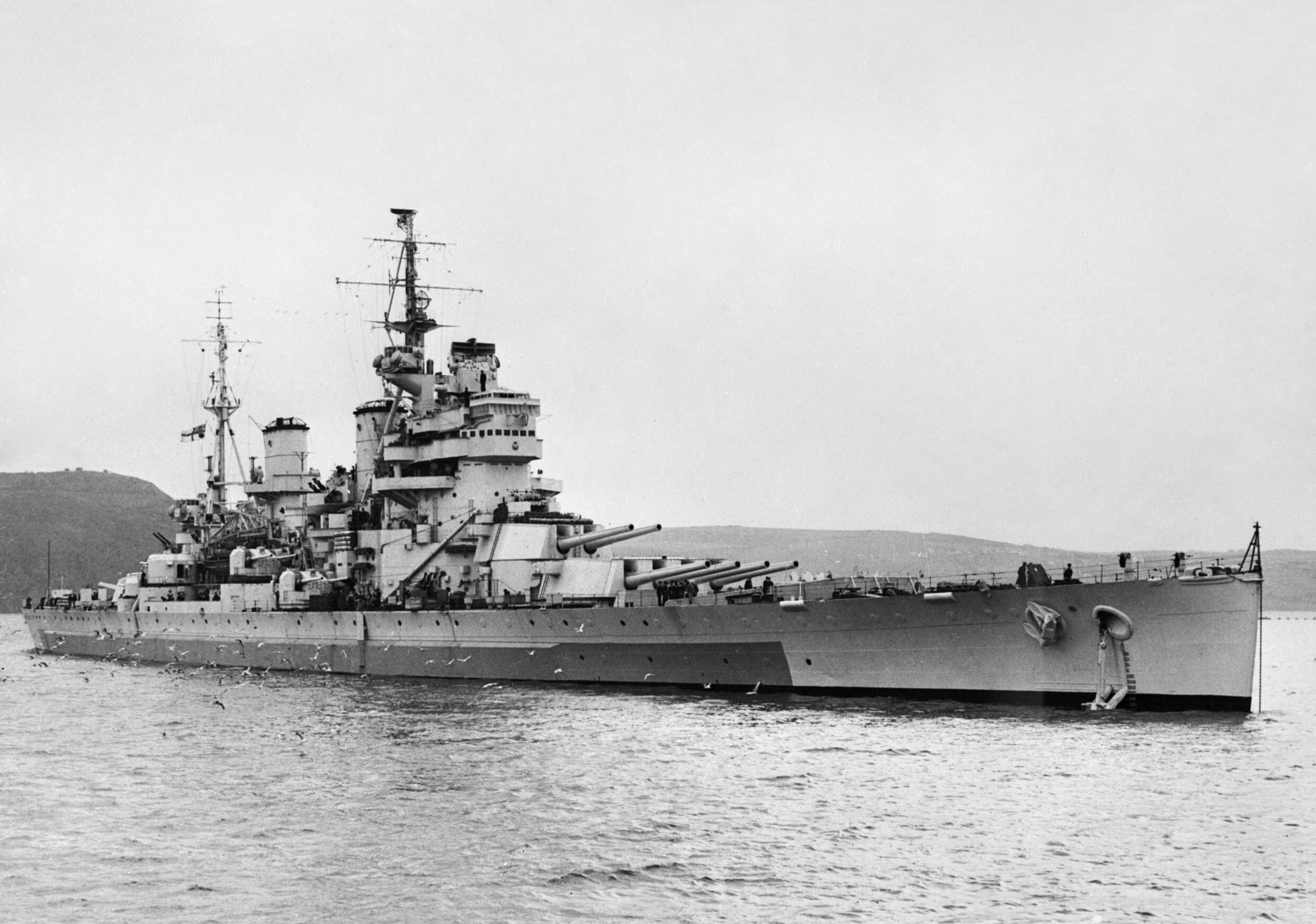
Anson

In late March 1945, King George V and Howe began operations in the Pacific as part of Task Force 57. The first major operation that the task force undertook was Operation Iceberg, offshore support for the US landings at Okinawa, which started on 1 April. During the operation King George V and Howe were subjected to sporadic Japanese kamikaze attacks, however, no damage was inflicted upon them by these attacks, while Howe succeeded in downing an attacking kamikaze plane. On 4 May, the two battleships led a forty-five-minute bombardment of Japanese air facilities in Ryukyu Islands.

In mid-July, they joined US battleships in a bombardment of industrial installations at Hitachi. During the Okinawa campaign, the pair supported British carriers. Their last offensive action was a night bombardment of Hamamatsu on 29 to 30 July 1945. Duke of York and Anson arrived too late to take part in hostilities, but on 15 August they accepted the surrender of Japanese forces occupying Hong Kong. King George V and Duke of York were present at the official Japanese surrender in Tokyo Bay. After the end of World War II, King George V became the flagship of the Home Fleet until December 1946, when she became a training vessel, before being scrapped in 1957. Duke of York became the flagship of the Home Fleet after King George V, until April 1949, before being scrapped in 1957. Howe returned to Portsmouth in January 1946 and spent the remainder of her career there before being scrapped in 1957. Anson briefly served as the flagship of the 1st Battle Squadron of the British Pacific Fleet and helped to re-occupy Hong Kong. In 1949 she was placed into reserve before being scrapped in 1957.
