= Admiralty Fire Control Table =

Electromechanical fire-control system

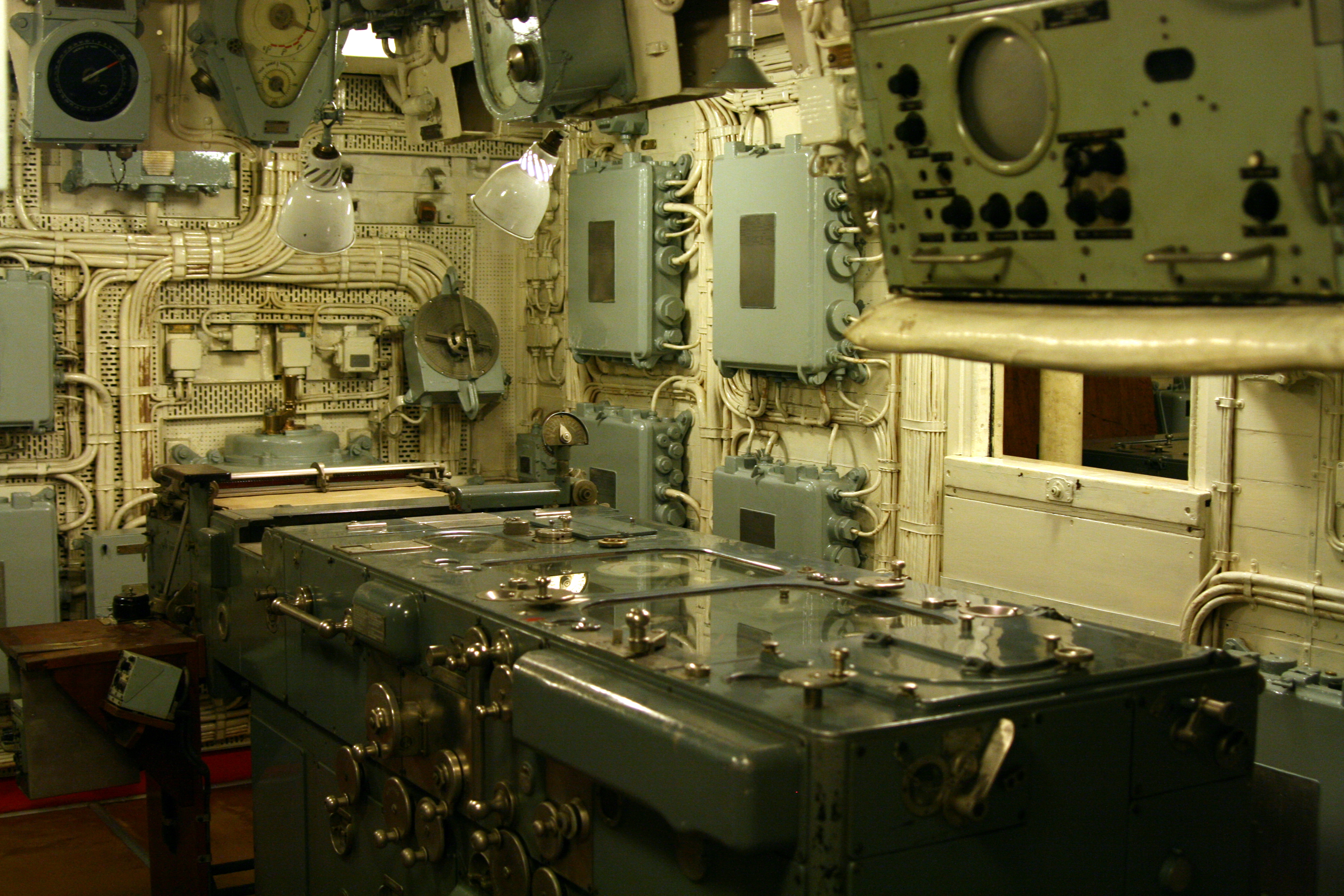
Admiralty Fire Control Table in the transmitting station of HMS Belfast.

The Admiralty Fire Control Table (A.F.C.T.) was an electromechanical analogue computer fire-control system that calculated the correct elevation and deflection of the main armament of a Royal Navy cruiser or battleship, so that the shells fired would strike a surface target. The AFCT MK 1 was fitted to HMS Nelson and Rodney in the early 1920s, while the battleships Warspite, Valiant, and Queen Elizabeth, and the battlecruiser Renown, received Mk VII tables in the late 1930s. Battleships of the King George V class received a Mk IX table, while Vanguard received the final variant, the Mk X. The AFCT was the successor to the Dreyer tables, developed by Captain (later Admiral) Frederic Charles Dreyer, and the Argo Clock, developed by Arthur Pollen, and received developmental input from both men.

The Admiralty Fire Control Clock (AFCC) was a simplified version of the AFCT and was used for the local control of main armament and primary control of secondary armament of battleships and cruisers, and the main armament of destroyers and other small vessels. Some smaller cruisers also used the AFCC for main armament control. The chief difference between the AFCT and the AFCC was the provision of a paper plotter in the former, which could plot both own ship and target ship movement and record the mean point of impact of the salvoes fired.

The AFCT and AFCC were used for gunnery control against surface targets. The High Angle Control System and Fuze Keeping Clock were used for gunnery control against aircraft.

== See also ==
- Director (military)

== Notes ==
- Campbell, John (1985). Naval Weapons of World War Two. Conway Maritime Press. ISBN 978-0-85177-329-2.
