= QF 2-pounder naval gun =

British naval gun

QF 2 pdr Mark VIII ("pom-pom")
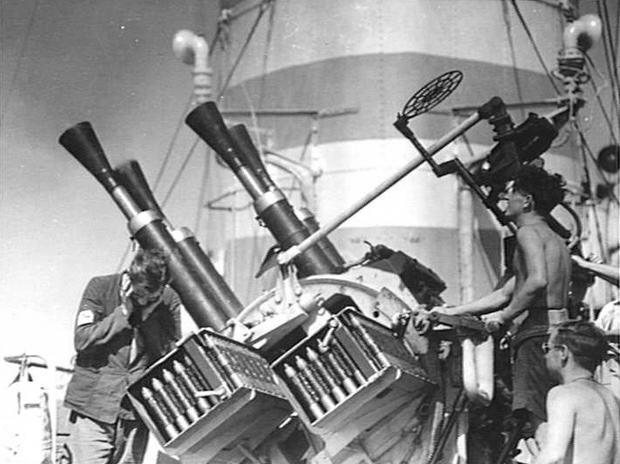
- Quadruple 2 pdr MK VIII guns on Mk.VII mounting aboard HMAS Nizam August 1941
- Type: Autocannon
- Place of origin: United Kingdom

Service history
- In service: 1917–1940s (Mk II); 1930–1940s (Mk VIII)
- Used by: British Empire; Japan; Thailand; Russian Empire; Kingdom of Italy; Netherlands
- Wars: First World War; Second World War

Production history
- Designer: Vickers Armstrongs
- Designed: 1915 (Mk II); 1923 (Mk VIII)
- Variants: Low-velocity (LV) & high-velocity (HV); RHI, LHI, RHO, LHO for multiple mountings Type 91 HI Shiki (Japanese)

Specifications (Mk.VIII HV)
- Mass: 850 lb (390 kg)
- Length: 8 ft 6 in (2.59 m)
- Shell: 40×158mmR
- Calibre: 40.4 mm (1.59 in)
- Barrels: 1, 4 or 8
- Rate of fire: 115 rpm
- Muzzle velocity: new gun: 732 m/s (2,400 ft/s) worn gun: 701 m/s (2,300 ft/s)
- Effective firing range: 3,960 m (13,300 ft) A/A ceiling
- Maximum firing range: 6,220 m (20,400 ft) at 701 m/s (2,300 ft/s)
- Feed system: 14-round steel-link belt
- Filling weight: 71 g (2.5 oz)

The 2-pounder gun, officially the QF 2-pounder (QF denoting "quick firing") and universally known as the pom-pom, was a 40 mm (1.6 in) British autocannon, used as an anti-aircraft gun by the Royal Navy. (Note: British military of the period traditionally denoted smaller guns in terms of the approximate weight of the standard projectile, rather than by its bore diameter, which in this case was 40 mm. References to 40-mm anti-aircraft guns invariably mean the Bofors gun, while references to 2-pounder anti-aircraft guns mean this gun.) The name came from the sound that the original models make when firing. This QF 2-pounder was not the same gun as the Ordnance QF 2-pounder, used by the British Army as an anti-tank gun and a tank gun, although they both fired 2 lb (0.91 kg), 40 mm (1.6 in) projectiles.

== Predecessors – Boer War and the Great War ==
=== QF 1 pounder ===
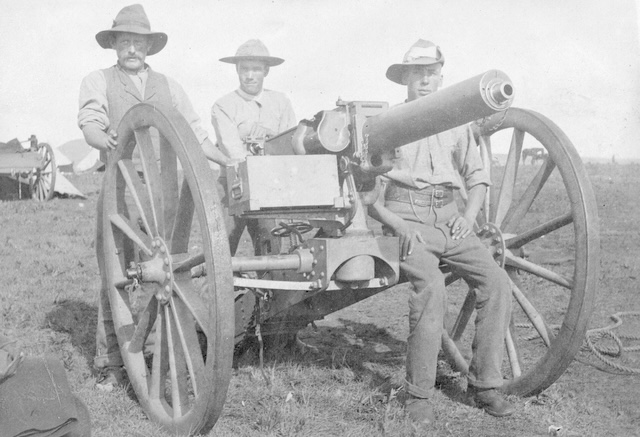
Australian troops with a QF 1-pounder Maxim auto cannon captured from the Boers

The first gun to be called a pom-pom was the 37 mm Nordenfelt-Maxim or "QF 1-pounder" introduced during the Second Boer War, the smallest artillery piece of that war. It fired a shell 1 lb (0.45 kg) in weight accurately over a distance of 3,000 yd (1.7 mi; 2.7 km). The barrel was water-cooled, and the shells were belt-fed from a 25-round fabric belt. This "auto cannon" fired explosive rounds (smokeless ammunition) at 450 rounds per minute. The Boers used them against the British, who, seeing their utility, bought guns from Vickers, which had acquired Maxim-Nordenfelt in 1897. During the First World War, it was used in the trenches of the Western Front against aircraft.

=== QF 1 1/2-pounder ===
The first naval pom-pom was the QF 1.5-pdr Mark I, a piece with a calibre of 37 mm (1.46 in) and a barrel 43 calibres long. This was tested in the Arethusa-class light cruisers HMS Arethusa and Undaunted but did not enter full service, being replaced instead by a larger weapon, the QF 2-pdr Mark II.

== QF 2-pounder Mark II ==
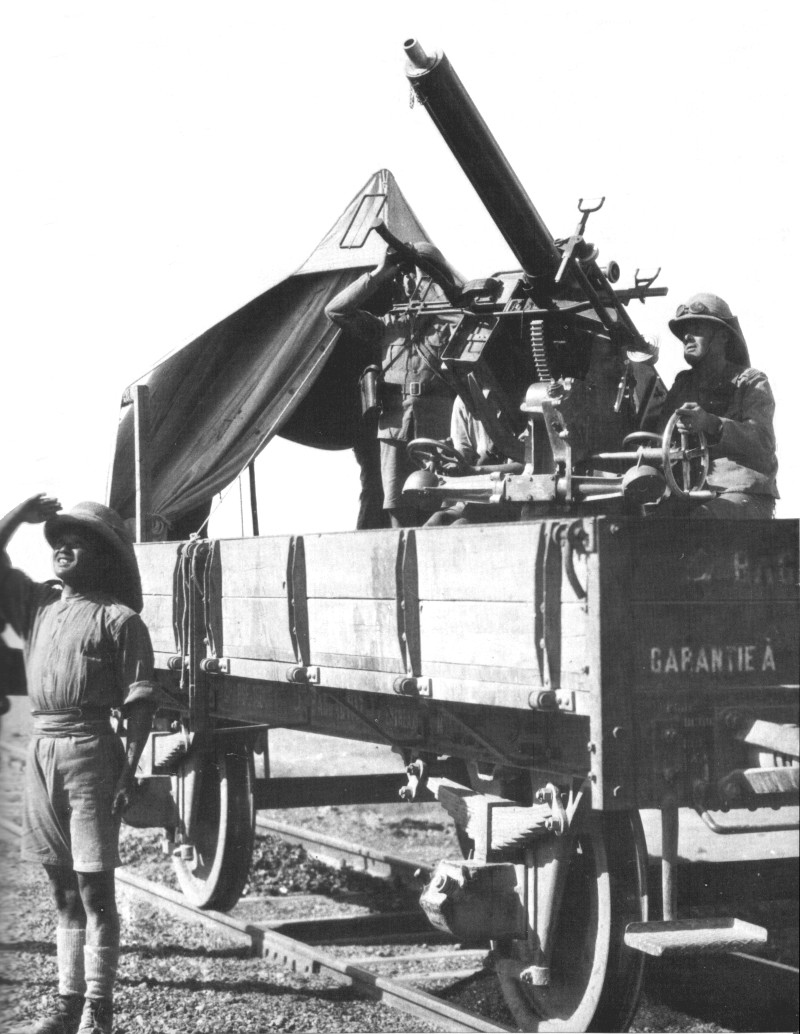
Posed photo of Mk II guarding a train against air attack, Mesopotamia, 1918

The QF 2-pounder Mark II was a larger version of the QF 1-pounder Maxim gun produced by Vickers. It was a 40 mm calibre gun with a water-cooled barrel and a Vickers-Maxim mechanism. It was ordered in 1915 by the Royal Navy as an anti-aircraft weapon for ships of cruiser size and below. The original models fired from hand-loaded fabric belts, although these were later replaced by steel-link belts. The enlargement was not entirely successful, as it left the mechanism rather light and prone to faults such as rounds falling out of the belts. In 1915, sixteen 2-pounders were mounted in armoured lorries as the Pierce-Arrow armoured AA lorry. In 1918, one example of this weapon was experimentally mounted on the upper envelope of His Majesty's Airship 23r.

Surviving weapons were brought out of storage to see service in World War II, mainly on board ships such as naval trawlers, motor boats and "armed yachts". It was used almost exclusively in the single-barrel, unpowered pedestal mountings P Mark II (Royal Navy nomenclature gave mountings and guns separate Mark numbers) except for a small number of weapons on the mounting Mark XV, which was a twin-barreled, powered mount. These were too heavy to be of any use at sea and were mounted ashore. All were scrapped by 1944.

- Calibre: 40 mm L/39
- Total length: 96 in (2,400 mm).
- Length of bore: 62 in (1,600 mm).
- Rifling: Polygroove, plain section, 54.84 in (1,392.94 mm), uniform twist 1 in 30 in (760 mm), 12 grooves.
- Weight of gun & breech assembly: 527 lb (239 kg)
- Shell Weight: 2 lb (0.91 kg) HE.
- Rate of Fire: 200 rpm
- Effective Range: 1,200 yd (1,100 m)
- Muzzle Velocity: 1,920 ft/s (590 m/s)

Some 7,000 guns were made. The gun was also used by the Japanese as the 40 mm/62 "HI" Shiki. The Regia Marina also used it from the Great War throughout World War II. It was superseded in the 1930s as a primary AA weapon on Italian warships by more modern guns, such as the Cannone-Mitragliera da 37/54 (Breda).

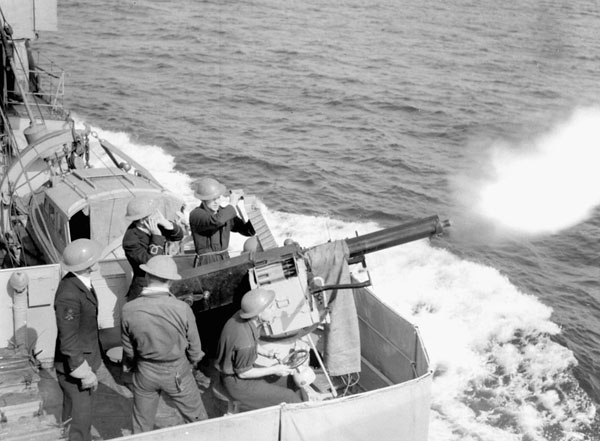
Gunners on HMCS Assiniboine fire their 2 pdr while escorting a troop convoy from Halifax to Britain, 10 July 1940.

== QF 2-pounder Mark VIII ==
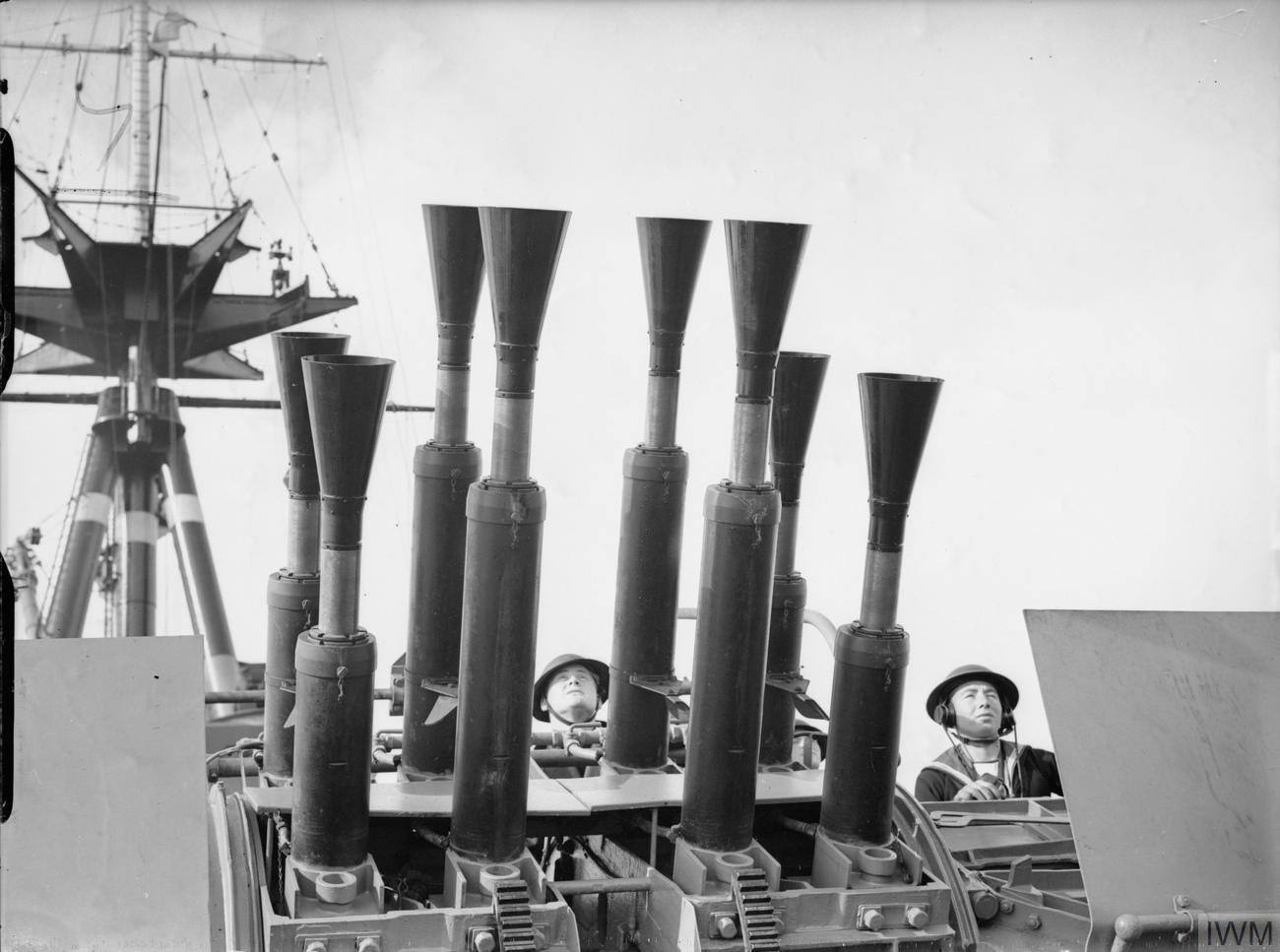
8-barrelled "Chicago piano" on HMS Rodney, viewed from below

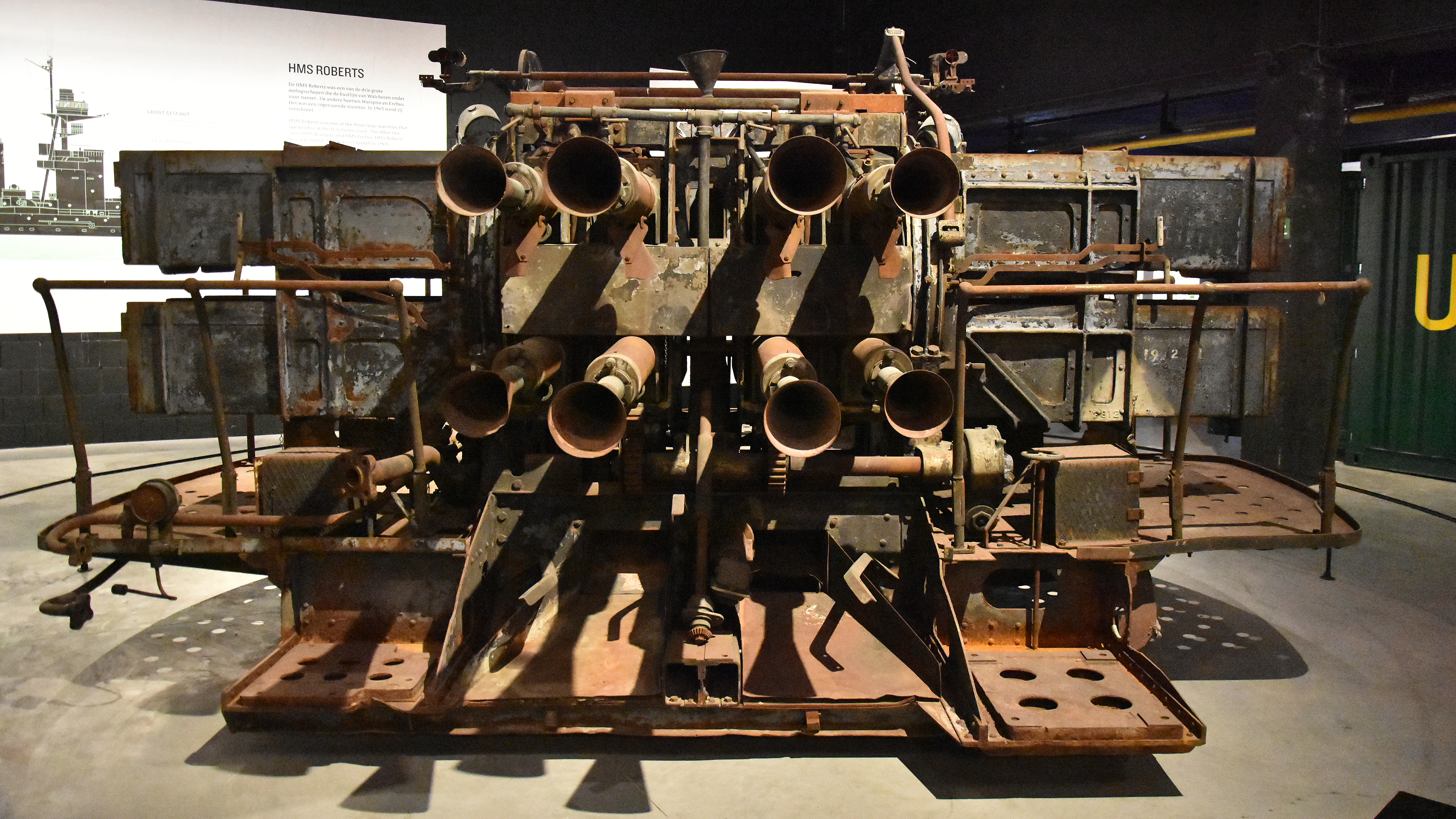
8-barrelled "Chicago piano" of HMS Roberts at Seafront in Zeebrugge. Its full name is : Vickers 2pdr QF MK VIII

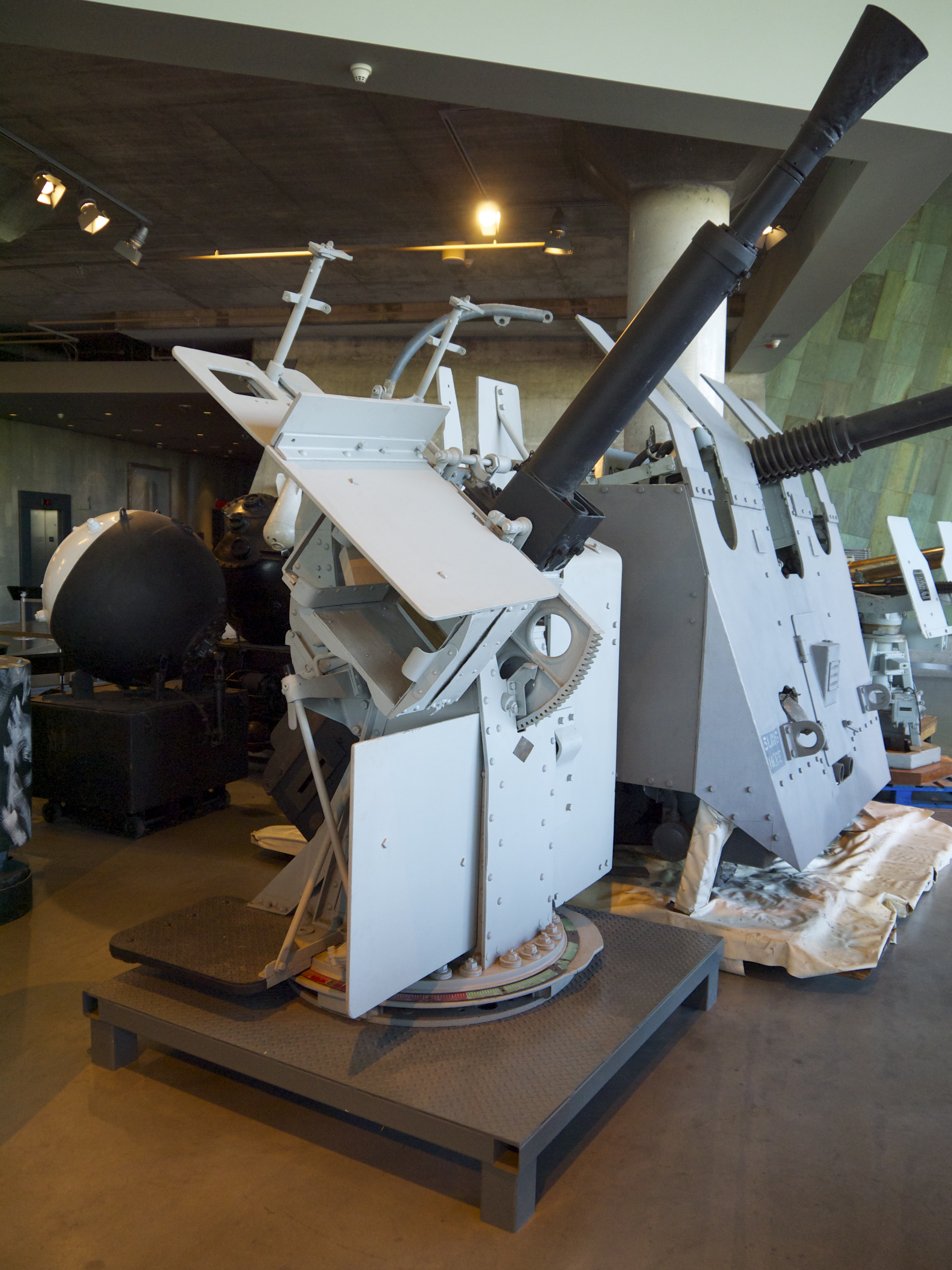
QF2 Mk. VIII single mount from HMCS Kamloops, displayed in Canadian War Museum

The Royal Navy had identified the need for a rapid-firing, multi-barrelled close-range anti-aircraft weapon at an early stage. Design work for such a weapon began in 1923 based on the earlier Mark II, undoubtedly to use the enormous stocks of 2-pounder ammunition left over from the First World War. Lack of funding led to a convoluted and drawn-out design and trials history and it was not until 1930 that these weapons began to enter service. Known as the QF 2-pounder Mark VIII, it is usually referred to as the "multiple pom-pom".

The initial mounting was the 11.8 to 17.35 ton, eight-barrelled mounting Mark V (later Mark VI), suitable for ships of cruiser and aircraft carrier size upward. From 1935, the quadruple mounting Mark VII, essentially half a Mark V or VI, entered service for ships of destroyer and cruiser size. These multiple gun mounts required four guns and were nicknamed the "Chicago Piano". The mount had two rows each of two or four guns. Guns were produced in both right- and left-hand and "inner" and "outer" so that the feed and ejector mechanisms matched.

Single-barrelled mounts, the Mark VIII (manual) and Mark XVI (power operated), were also widely used, mainly in small escorts (such as the Flower-class corvettes) and coastal craft (especially early Fairmile D motor torpedo boats). The Mark XVI mounting was related to the twin mounting Mark V for the Oerlikon 20 mm cannon and the "Boffin" mounting for the Bofors 40 mm gun. Magazines ranged from 140 rounds per gun for the eight-barrelled mount to 56 rounds for the single mounts. This large ammunition capacity (1,120 rounds) gave the eight-barrelled mount the ability to fire continuously for 73 seconds without reloading. A high velocity (HV), 1.8 lb (820 g), round was developed for the pom-pom, just before the Second World War, which raised the new gun muzzle velocity from 2,040 ft/s (622 m/s) to 2400 ft/s (732 m/s).

Many older mountings were modified with conversion kits to fire HV ammunition, while most new mounts were factory built to fire HV ammunition. A mount modified or designed for HV ammunition was given a '*' designation; for example a Mk V mount modified for HV ammunition would be a Mk V*.

== US Navy ==
The United States Navy also considered adopting the pom-pom gun prior to its entry into the Second World War, and conducted a series of trials between their own 1.1" gun, the U.S. Army 37 mm Gun, the Vickers 40 mm pom-pom, and the Bofors 40 mm:

Among the machine guns under consideration were the Army's 37-mm and the British Navy's 2-pounder, more commonly known as the "pompom." The decision soon narrowed to a choice between the Bofors and the British gun. The British were anxious to have their gun adopted, and the fact that British aid would be readily available in initiating manufacture was put forward as an argument in favor of its selection. The 2-pounder, moreover was giving a good account of itself on British ships. On the other hand, there was the distinct disadvantage that the gun was designed for cordite powder, and no manufacturing facilities for the production of this ammunition were available in the United States. Thorough study revealed that the gun could not be converted to take American powder. Another consideration was muzzle velocity: The pompom had a relatively low velocity, 2350 feet per second as compared with 2830 for the Bofors. The success of the pompom in action was more than offset by the proved qualities of the Bofors in the hands of a number of powers who were using it, and the Bureau decided to join that group. Shortly after the Bureau's selection of the Bofors, British naval officials also decided to adopt the gun.

== Wartime use ==
Although an advanced weapon when it was introduced, by the outbreak of World War II advances in aircraft would have made it obsolete but for the introduction of the high-velocity round and new director designs. It was intended that the curtain of fire it threw up would be sufficient to deter attacking aircraft, which it did, but was hampered by the ineffective Mk III director. The MK IV Director with a Gyro Rate Unit and Type 282 radar was a great advance and was introduced on the King George V-class battleships. In January 1941, HMS Illustrious′s Mk VIII (HV) mountings performed flawlessly firing 30,000 rounds with very few stoppages. When HMS Prince of Wales was attacked and sunk by Japanese aircraft near Singapore, the subsequent report judged that a single 40 mm Bofors gun firing tracer was a more effective anti-aircraft weapon than a multiple pom-pom in director control, as the pom-poms did not have tracer ammunition and the pom-pom ammunition had deteriorated badly in its ready use lockers, while the Type 282 radar units also failed in the equatorial heat. In the same action, the Commissioned Gunner of HMS Repulse spent the whole action running from one pom-pom mount to another trying to keep them operational due to the faulty ammunition. The pom-poms on Repulse shot down two of the four confirmed kills made by Force Z, while Prince of Wales' pom-poms did record hits on enemy aircraft.

The Royal Navy judged the pom-pom's effectiveness to range from about half that of the Bofors, per gun, against torpedo planes to about equal against Kamikaze attackers. It was a ubiquitous weapon that outnumbered the Bofors gun in Commonwealth naval service up to the end of World War II and it shot down many Axis aircraft. Later innovations such as Remote Power Control (RPC) coupled to a radar-equipped tachymetric (speed predicting) director increased the accuracy enormously and problems with the fuses and reliability were also remedied. The single mountings received a reprieve toward the end of the war as the 20 mm Oerlikon guns had insufficient stopping power to counter Japanese kamikaze aircraft and there were insufficient numbers of Bofors guns to meet demand.

- Calibre: 40 mm L/39
- Shell Weight: 2 lb (910 g) or 1.8 lb (820 g) for High-Velocity (HV) round
- Rate of Fire: 115 rpm fully automatic
- Effective Range: 3,800 yards (3,475 m) or 5,000 yards (4,572 m) HV
- Effective Ceiling (HV): 13,300 feet (3,960 m)
- Muzzle Velocity: 2,040 ft/s (622 m/s) or 2400 ft/s (732 m/s) for HV

== QF 2-pounder Mark XIV ==
The QF 2-pounder Mark XIV was the Rolls-Royce 40 mm cannon, which had been developed by Rolls-Royce as a competitor to the 40 mm "Vickers S" gun as an aircraft weapon. The latter was the more successful design, and found some use as an anti-tank weapon. A reworked version was adopted by the Royal Navy as a weapon for Motor Gun Boats, being adopted in the Fairmile C type as well as British Power Boat Company 60- and 70-foot (18- and 21-metre) type MGBs. It had a semi-automatic horizontally sliding breech block and was shipped on a manually trained pedestal mount. The weapon was not a success and of the 1,200 ordered only some 600 were delivered. It was initially replaced in various MGBs by single 20 mm Oerlikon cannon in order to make good, being ultimately succeeded in the large quick-firer role later in the war by the 57 mm Molins 6-pounder gun, the British Army's QF 6-pounder gun anti-tank gun with an auto-loader.

== Ammunition ==
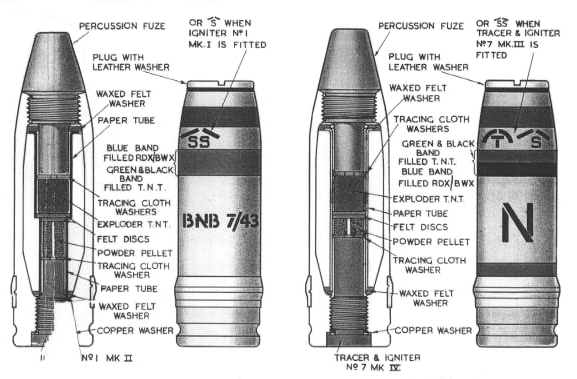
World War II high-velocity 2-pounder shells.

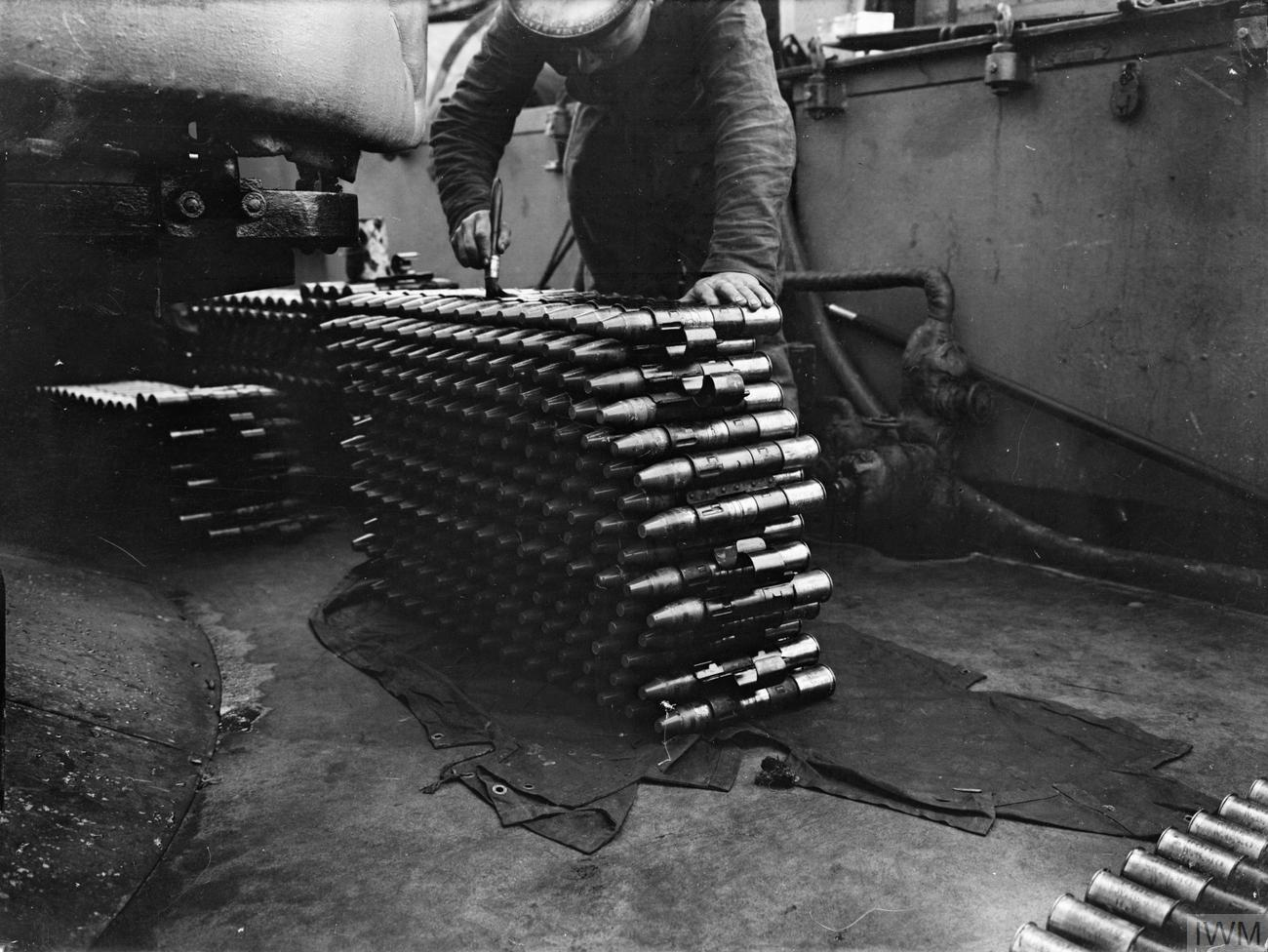
A stack of 14 linked rounds of naval pom-pom ammunition.

== Surviving examples ==
- 40 ItK/15 V (Vickers) in the Finnish Ilmatorjuntamuseo (Anti-Aircraft Museum) in Tuusula
- 40mm/39 2-pounder Mk. VIII V.S.M. (Vickers, Sons & Maxim) on Single Mounting in the Canadian War Museum (Canadian War Museum) in Ottawa, Canada

== See also ==
- QF 1 pounder pom-pom
- List of anti-aircraft guns
