= HACS =

British anti-aircraft fire-control system

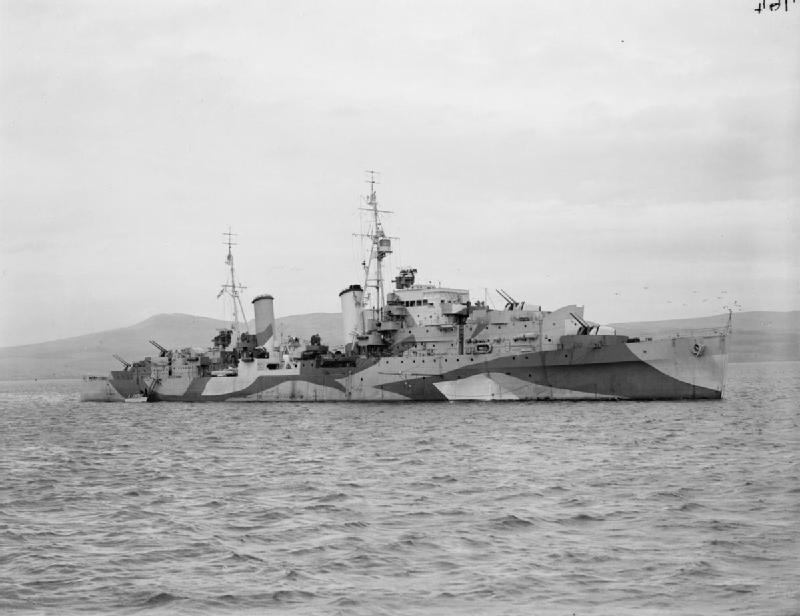
Anti-aircraft cruiser HMS Scylla. Her four twin 4.5-inch gun mountings are controlled by the two High Angle Director Towers, one sited behind the bridge and the other abaft the after funnel.

High Angle Control System (HACS) was a British anti-aircraft fire-control system employed by the Royal Navy from 1931 and used widely during World War II. HACS calculated the necessary deflection required to place an explosive shell in the location of a target flying at a known height, bearing and speed.

== Early history ==
The HACS was first proposed in the 1920s and began to appear on Royal Navy (RN) ships in January 1930, when HACS I went to sea in HMS Valiant. HACS I did not have any stabilisation or power assist for director training. HACS III which appeared in 1935, had provision for stabilisation, was hydraulically driven, featured much improved data transmission and it introduced the HACS III Table. The HACS III table (computer) had numerous improvements including raising maximum target speed to 350 kn (650 km/h; 400 mph), continuous automatic fuze prediction, improved geometry in the deflection Screen, and provisions for gyro inputs to provide stabilisation of data received from the director. The HACS was a control system and was made possible by an effective data transmission network between an external gun director, a below decks fire control computer, and the ship's medium calibre anti-aircraft (AA) guns.

== Development ==
=== Operation ===
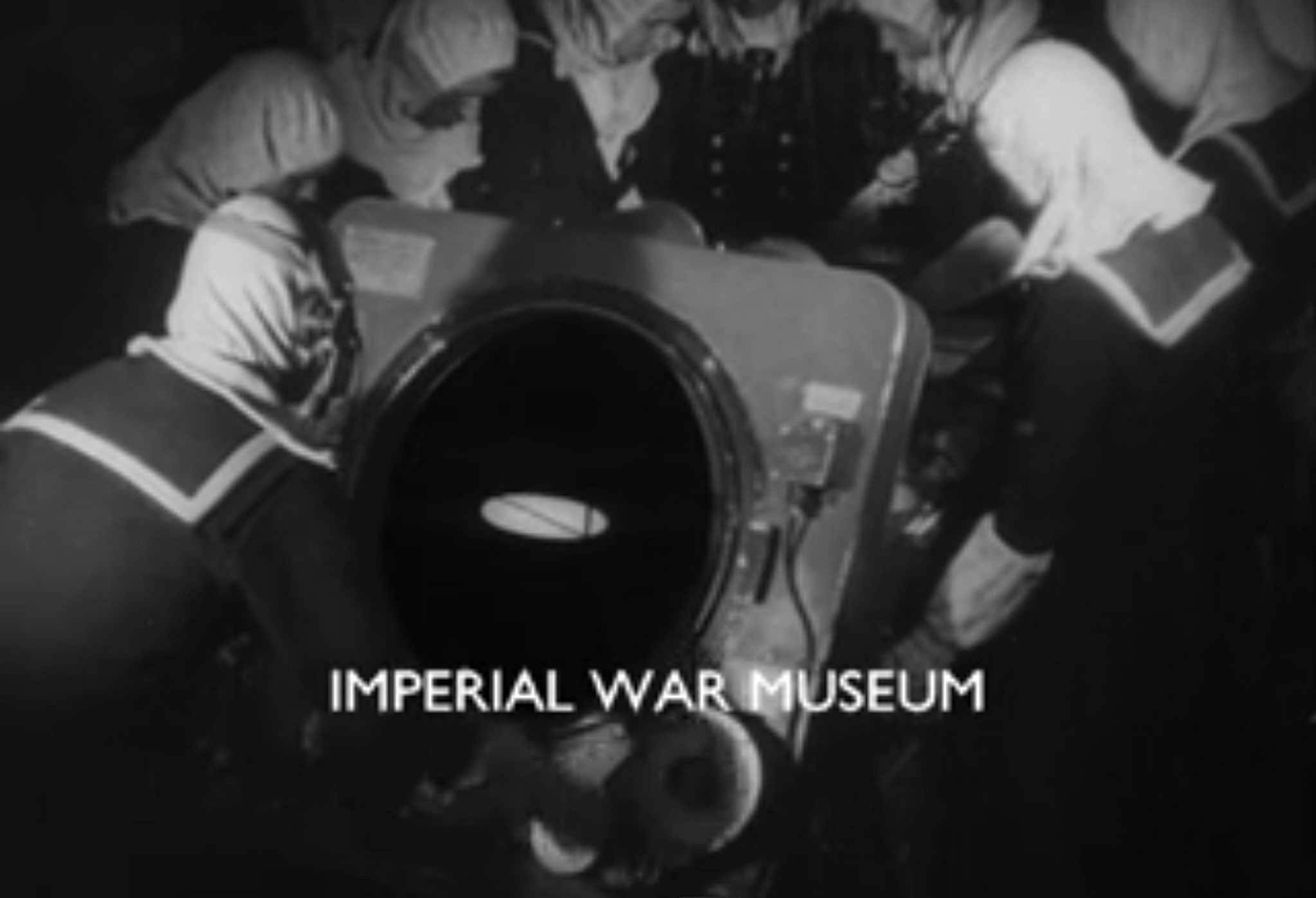
HACS deflection screen and table with the deflection screen operator in the foreground. The solid line through the centre of the ellipse shows the wire aligned with the aircraft's course (moving right to left) of approximately 295 degrees; the Deflection Screen operator has his right hand on the Lateral Deflection Control which is aligning the vertical line with the ellipse, and the aircraft track wire, and he is also using his left hand to align the Vertical Deflection Control and a horizontal wire, (which cannot be seen) so that it also intersects the aircraft track wire at the edge of the ellipse.

The bearing and altitude of the target was measured directly on the UD4 Height Finder/Range Finder, a coincidence rangefinder located in the High Angle Director Tower (HADT). The direction of travel was measured by aligning a binocular graticule with the target aircraft fuselage. The early versions of HACS, Mk. I through IV, did not measure target speed directly, but estimated this value based on the target type. All of these values were sent via selsyn to the HACS in the High Angle Calculating Position (HACP) located below decks. The HACS used these values to calculate the range rate (often called rate along in RN parlance), which is the apparent target motion along the line of sight. This was also printed on a paper plot so that a range rate officer could assess its accuracy.

This calculated range rate was fed back to the UD4 where it powered a motor to move prisms within the UD4. If all the measurements were correct, this movement would track the target, making it appear motionless in the sights. If the target had apparent movement, the UD4 operator would adjust the range and height, and in so doing would update the generated range rate, thereby creating a feedback loop which could establish an estimate of the target's true speed and direction. The HACS also displayed the predicted bearing and elevation of the target on indicators in the Director tower, or on later variants, the HACS could move the entire Director through Remote Power Control so that it could continue to track the target if the target became obscured.

The angle measured by the graticule also caused a metal wire to rotate around the face of a large circular display on one side of the HACS, known as the Deflection Display. The measured value of altitude and range, and estimated value of target speed, caused optics to focus a lamp onto a ground glass screen behind the wire, displaying an ellipse whose shape changed based on these measures. The deflection operator used two controls to move additional wire indicators so they lay on top of the intersection of the outer edge of the ellipse where it was crossed by the rotating metal wire. The intersection of the ellipse and the target direction was used as a basis for calculating elevation and training of the guns. The ellipse method had the advantage of requiring very little in the way of mechanical computation and essentially modelled target position in real-time with a consequent rapid solution time.

=== Information flow ===
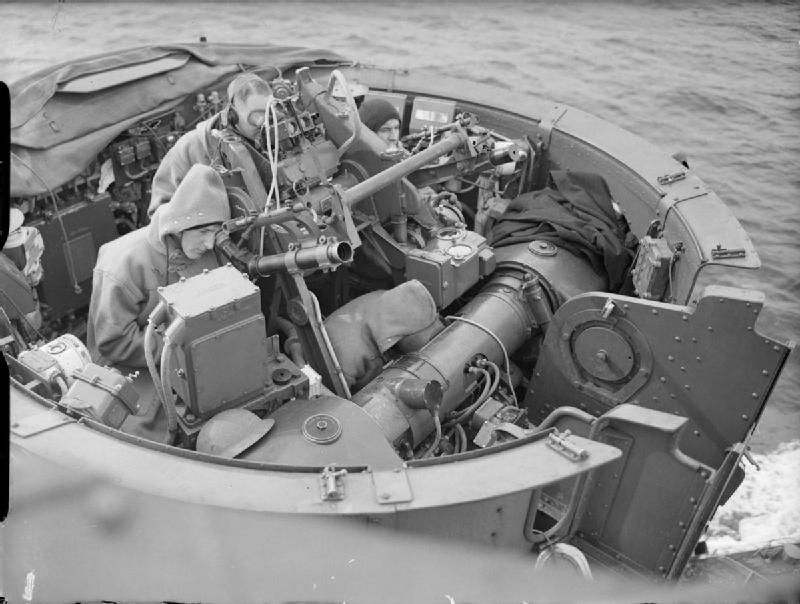
HADT on HMS King George V. The control officer is shown looking through his binoculars, while the rangetaker's face is hidden.

The HADT provides target direction, range, speed, altitude and bearing data to the HACP, which transmits direction and fuse timing orders to the guns. The HACP transmits the computer generated range rate and generated bearing back to the HADT, creating a feedback loop between the HADT and HACP, so that the fire control solution generated by the computer becomes more accurate over time if the target maintains a straight line course. The HADT also observes the accuracy of the resulting shell bursts and uses these bursts to correct target speed and direction estimates, creating another feed back loop from the guns to the HADT and thence to the HACP, again increasing the accuracy of the solution, if the target maintains a straight line course. Most guns controlled by the HACS had Fuze Setting Pedestals or Fuze Setting Trays where the correct fuze timing was set on a clockwork mechanism within the AA shell warhead, so that the shell would explode in the vicinity of the target aircraft.

=== Target drones ===
The HACS was the first Naval AA system to be used against radio controlled aircraft, and achieved the first AA kill against these targets in 1933. In March 1936, six Queen Bee targets were destroyed by the RN Mediterranean Fleet during intensive AA practice at a time of extreme tension between the UK and Italy. Target practice against target drones was carried out using special shells which were designed to minimise the possibility of destroying expensive targets. The RN allowed media coverage of AA target practice and a 1936 newsreel has footage of a shoot. In 1935 the RN also began to practice HACS controlled shoots of target aircraft at night.

=== Tachometric and radar additions ===
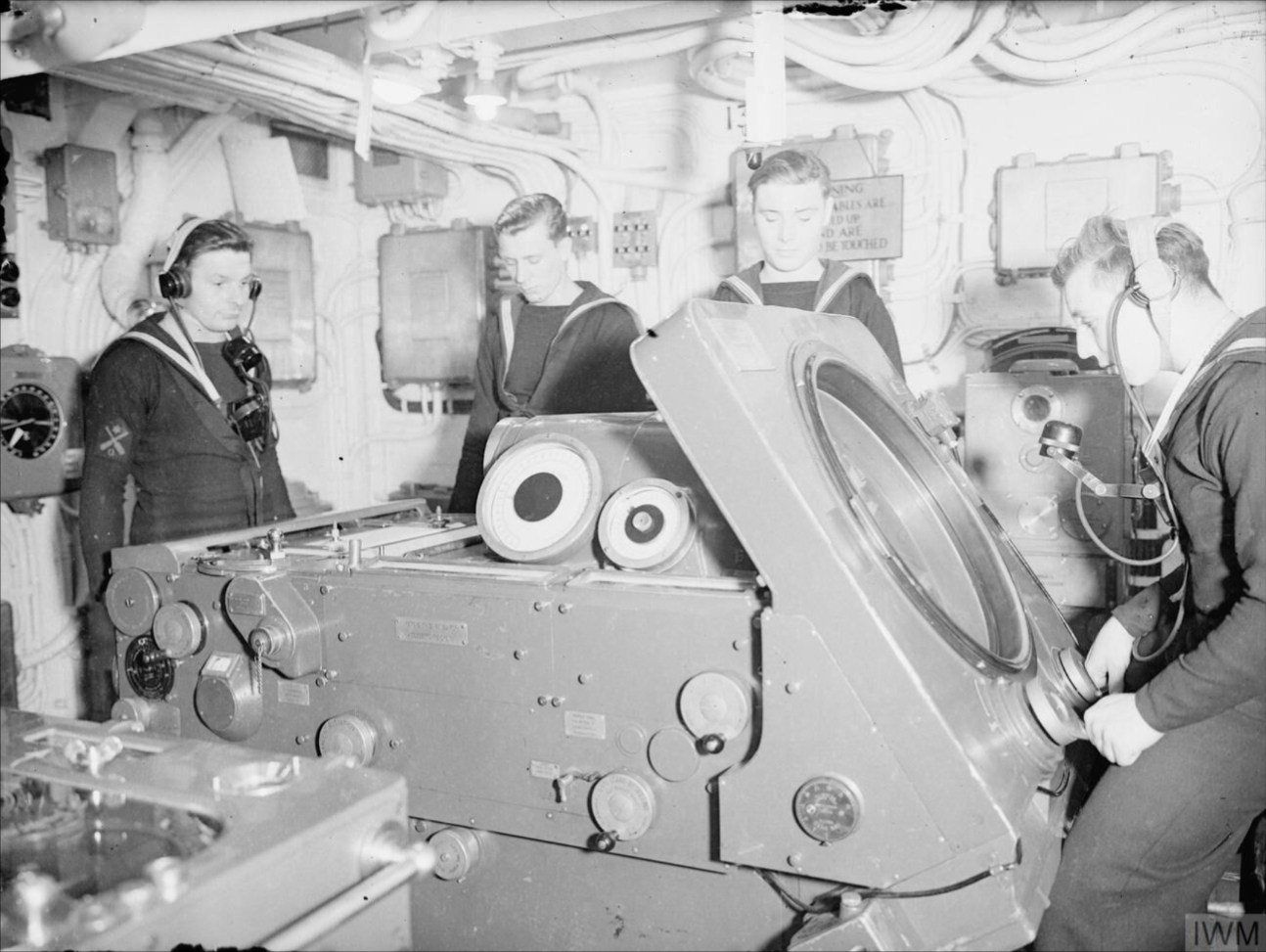
High Angle Control System fire control computer (table) Mk IV, aboard HMS Duke of York. The Deflection operator is seated in front of the deflection screen. The range plot operator stands directly opposite.

The RN moved quickly to add true tachometric target motion prediction and radar ranging to the HACS by mid 1941. The RN was the first navy to adopt dedicated FC AA radars. However the system, in common with all World War II-era mechanical AA fire control system still had severe limitations as even the highly advanced United States Navy (USN) Mk 37 system in 1944 needed an average of 1,000 rounds of 5-inch (127 mm) ammunition fired per kill. In 1940 the Gyro Rate Unit (GRU) was added to the HACS system, an analogue computer capable of directly calculating target speed and direction, converting the HACS into a tachymetric system. Also in 1940, radar ranging was added to the HACS. The GRU and its associated computer, the "Gyro Rate Unit Box" (GRUB) no longer assumed straight and level flying on the part of the target. GRU/GRUB could generate target speed and position data at angular rates of up to 6 degrees per second, which was sufficient to track a 360-knot (670 km/h; 410 mph) crossing target at a range of 2,000 yards (1,800 m).

== The Fuze Keeping Clock ==
RN destroyers were hampered by the lack of good dual-purpose weapons suitable for ships of destroyer size; for much of the war 40° was the maximum elevation of the 4.7-inch (120 mm) guns equipping such ships, which were consequently unable to engage directly attacking dive bombers, although they could provide "barrage" and "predicted fire" to protect other ships from such attacks. Destroyers did not use HACS, but rather the Fuze Keeping Clock (FKC), a simplified version of HACS. Starting in 1938 all new RN destroyers, from the Tribal class onwards, were fitted with a FKC and continuous prediction fuse setting trays for each main armament gun. WWII experience from all navies showed that dive bombers could not be engaged successfully by any remote computer-predictive AA system using mechanical fuzes due to the lag time in the computer and the minimum range of optical rangefinders. In common with other contemporary navies, pre-war designed RN destroyers suffered from a lack of short-range, rapid-fire AA with which to engage dive bombers.

== The Auto Barrage Unit ==
The Auto Barrage Unit or ABU, was a specialised gunnery computer and radar ranging system that used Type 283 radar. It was developed to provide computer prediction and radar anti-aircraft fire control to main and secondary armament guns that did not have inherent anti-aircraft capability. The ABU was designed to allow the guns to be pre-loaded with time fused ammunition, and it then tracked incoming enemy aircraft, aimed the guns continuously to track the aircraft, and then fired the guns automatically when the predicted aircraft position reached the preset fuse range of the previously loaded shells. The ABU was also used with guns that were nominally controlled by the HACS to provide a limited blind fire capability.

== Wartime experience ==
By May 1941, RN cruisers, such as HMS Fiji, were engaging the Luftwaffe with stabilised HACS IV systems with GRU/GRUB and Type 279 radar with the Precision Ranging Panel, which gave +/- 25 yd accuracy out to 14,000 yds. HMS Fiji was sunk in the Battle of Crete after running out of AA ammunition but her HACS IV directed 4-inch AA gun battery fended off Luftwaffe attacks for many hours.

Demonstrating the RN's rapid strides in naval AA gunnery, in May 1941, HMS Prince of Wales went to sea with HACS IVGB, with full radar ranging systems, and nine AA associated fire control radars: four Type 285 radar, one on each High Angle Director Tower (HADT) and four Type 282 radar, one on each Mk IV director for the QF 2 pdr (40mm) "pom pom" mounts, and a long range Type 281 radar Warning Air (WA) radar which also had precision ranging panels for aerial and surface targets. This placed HMS Prince of Wales in the forefront of naval HA AA fire control systems at that time. In August and September 1941, HMS Prince of Wales demonstrated excellent long range radar directed AA fire during Operation Halberd. Although the shortcomings of HACS are often blamed for the loss of Force Z, the scope of the Japanese attack far exceeded anything the HACS had been designed to handle in terms of aircraft numbers and performance. The failure of anti-aircraft gunnery to deter the Japanese bombers was also influenced by unique circumstances. The HACS was originally designed with Atlantic conditions in mind and Prince of Wales's AA FC radars had become unserviceable in the extreme heat and humidity in Malayan waters and her 2-pdr ammunition had deteriorated badly as well.

The RN made the following claims for ship borne anti-aircraft fire against enemy aircraft, from September 1939 up to 28 March 1941: :Certain kills: 234, Probable kills: 116, Damage claims: 134

The RN made the following claims for ship borne anti-aircraft fire against enemy aircraft, from September 1939 up to 31 Dec 1942:

- Major warships (ships likely to have HACS or FKC fire control systems)

Certain kills: 524
Probable kills: 183
Damage claims: 271

- Minor warships and merchant vessels (most having no AA fire control systems)

Certain kills: 216
Probable kills: 83
Damage claims: 177

Total kill claims: 740
Total probable claims: 266
Total damage claims: 448

== Radar and the Mark VI Director ==
HACS used various director towers that were generally equipped with Type 285 as it became available. This metric wavelength system employed six yagi antennas that could take ranges of targets, and take accurate readings of bearing using a technique known as "lobe switching" but only crude estimates of altitude. It could not, therefore, "lock on" to aerial targets and was unable to provide true blindfire capabilities, which no other navy was able to do until the USN developed advanced radars in 1944 using technology transfers from the UK. This situation was not remedied until the introduction of the HACS Mark VI director in 1944 that was fitted with centimetric Type 275 radar. Another improvement was the addition of Remote Power Control (RPC), in which the anti-aircraft guns automatically trained with the director tower, with the necessary changes in bearing and elevation to allow for convergent fire. Previously the gun crews had to follow mechanical pointers that indicated where the director tower wanted the guns to train.

== HACS systems in use or planned in August 1940 ==
HACS Directors fitted to ships in a document dated as "revised Aug 1940":

- HACS III: ABC transmission, AV cradle for 15 ft HF/RF. Introduced Mk III table.

HMS Ajax, Galatea, Arethusa, Coventry, HMAS Hobart, Sydney, Perth

- HACS III*: Similar to MarkIII but with larger windscreen and space for a rate officer.

HMS Penelope, Southampton, Newcastle, Malaya, Hood*, Australia*, Nelson*, Royal Sovereign*, Barham*, Resolution*, Cairo*, Excellent (gunnery training school)*, Revenge*, Calcutta*, Carlisle*, Curacoa*, Exeter*, Adventure*, Warspite*. Ships marked with * had roll stabilisation for layer.

- HACS III*G as mark III but fitted with GRU and roll stabilisation for the layer.
- HACS IV: Similar to MkIII but with circular screen, magslip transmission and roll stabilisation for the layer. Introduced Mk IV table.

HMS Birmingham, Sheffield, Glasgow, Aurora, Liverpool, Manchester, Gloucester, Dido, and Fiji classes, Forth, Maidstone, Renown, Valiant, Illustrious, Formidable and Ark Royal.

- HACS IV G: Mk IV with Gyro rate unit.

Dido class and Fiji classes.

- HACS IV GB: Mk IV and fitted with GRU and complete stabilisation in laying and training, Keelavite system of power training.

HMS King George V and Prince of Wales, Dido and Fiji classes.

- HACS V: Improved design, partially enclosed, complete stabilisation for elevation and training. Keelavite system of power training, and GRU. Duplex 15 ft HF/RF. Uses Mk IV table.

HMS Duke of York, Anson and Howe.

- HACS V* :As Mk V but single HF/RF and raised HF/RF compared to Mk V.

HMS Indomitable, Implacable and Indefatigable.

== See also ==
- Argo clock
- Ship gun fire-control system
- Stabilisierter Leitstand
