= Gyro rate unit =

Gyro rate unit refers to a fire-control computer developed by the Royal Navy of the United Kingdom in 1937, and which was used extensively on British warships in World War II. In the 1930s the Royal Navy began to investigate the possibility of combining gyroscopes with optical sights to directly and accurately measure target aircraft speed and direction and began development of the GRU in 1937. A gyroscope was attached, via mechanical linkage, to an optical monocular sight to form the gyro rate unit or GRU.

Gyroscopes, when spinning, keep their spin axes pointed in a given direction if they are undisturbed. The basic premise of the GRU was that as the cross-hairs of the optical sight were kept centred on the moving target aircraft, the mechanical linkage would pull the gyroscope in the direction of the aircraft movement. The force required to move the gyroscope is proportional to the observed target movement across the line of sight. This force was measured by the deflection of a spring-loaded device and the deflection measurement was combined with rangefinder, and/or, radar measured target range and altitude in a specialized computer, the gyro rate unit box (GRUB).

== History ==
The Royal Navy, after World War I, became increasingly concerned with the threat posed by aerial attack. In 1930 the RN began equipping ships with the High Angle Control System, a non-tachymetric anti-aircraft fire control system, that would compute the gun laying orders and the time fuze setting of the anti-aircraft guns, to hit the target. The HACS marks I through IV depended upon the control officer inputting to the computer an estimated aircraft direction, and speed, which was combined with range and height measurement from an optical coincidence rangefinder to permit the computer to form a solution. The control officer would estimate target speed based upon aircraft type, while target direction could only be crudely measured by aligning the graticule of his binoculars with the aircraft fuselage. Unfortunately, these estimates of target speed and direction were often in error, and it took time for the HACS to correct these estimates through a feedback loop from the director to the computer, thus delaying the generation of a correct fire control solution and reducing the accuracy of the resulting gunfire. In the 1930s the Royal Navy began to investigate the possibility of combining gyroscopes with optical sights to directly and accurately measure target aircraft speed and direction and began development of the GRU in 1937.

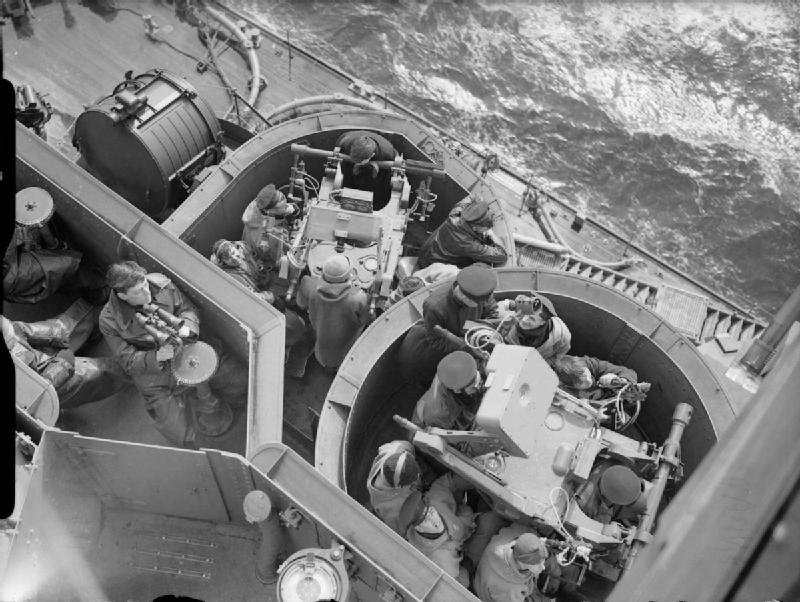
Pom-pom directors, Mk IV on HMS King George V. The large rectangular box centered above the director contains the Gyro Rate Unit. This image was taken early in King George V's career as the directors do not yet have Type 282 radar.

== The gyro rate unit box ==
The gyro rate unit box used the measured target motion, range and height, to accurately determine the true direction of movement of the target, including its rate of altitude change, and passed this information to the HACS computer, which then generated the gun laying orders and the correct time fuze setting. The HACS computer could not directly use rate of altitude change information, so the GRUB would calculate the target altitude, direction and apparent speed for a short interval of time, equal to the loading cycle of the guns, in advance of the actual time and feed this to the HACS computer allowing it to generate correct gunlaying and fuze setting orders. The GRUB thus converted the HACS into a tachymetric fire control system. The GRU and the GRUB began to appear on RN ships in 1940. The GRU/GRUB could calculate target speed and direction for targets with a maximum speed of 360 knots, or 6 degrees of target motion per second and was most accurate at shorter ranges where apparent target motion was highest. GRU/GRUB was also used on The Pom-Pom Director, Mark IV, and with the Fuze Keeping Clock.

== See also ==
- List of anti-aircraft guns
