= Fuze Keeping Clock =

Device used for a fire control computer

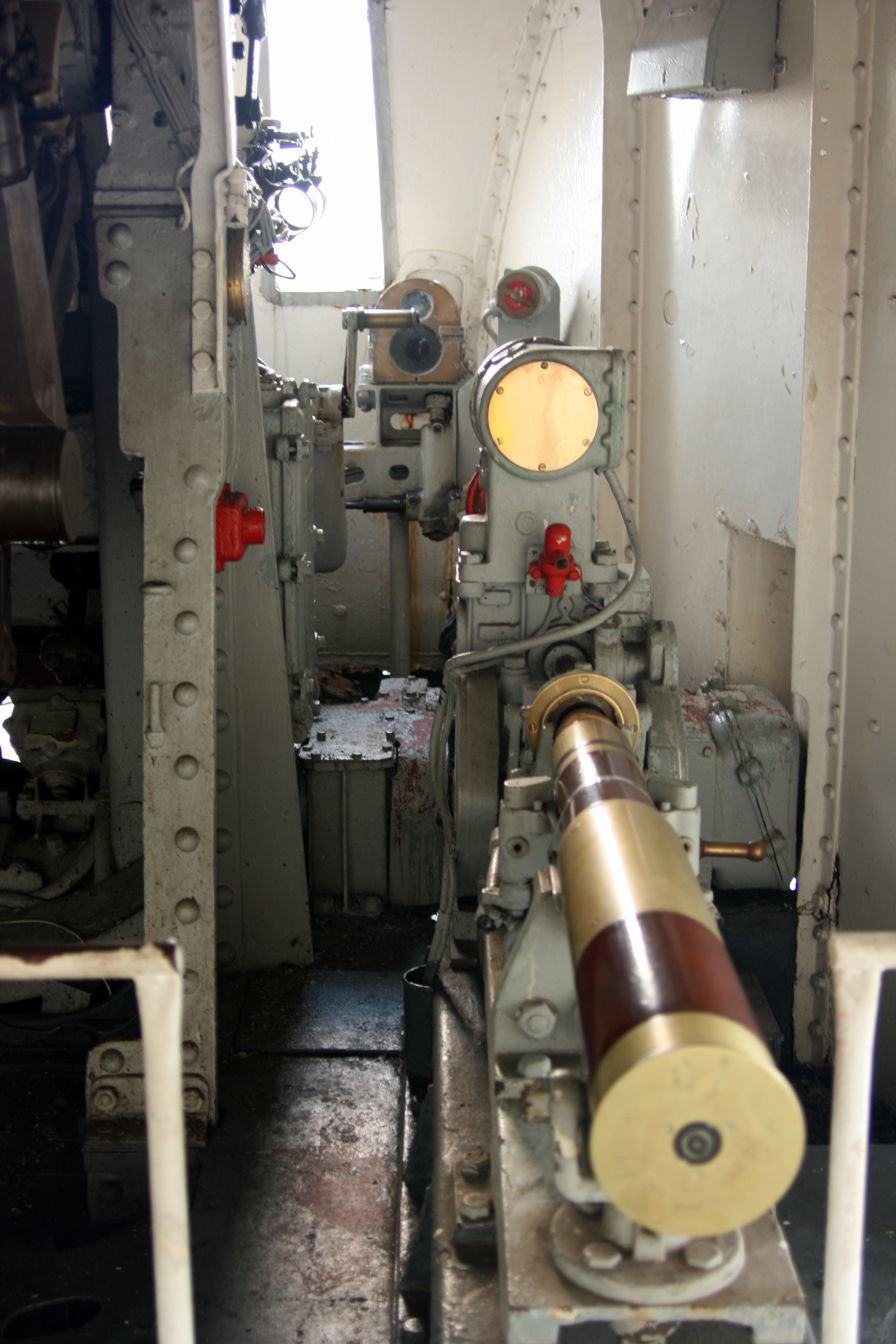
A Mk V Fuze setting tray with a 4 in (102 mm) anti-aircraft (A/A) round. The Fuze setting tray received its fuze timing information, via electrical signals from the FKC, on a receiver dial. The operator then matched the settings on the receiver dial with the indicator dial on the tray, which then adjusted the clockwork mechanism in the A/A warhead to the calculated time of flight to the target.

The Fuze Keeping Clock (FKC) was a simplified version of the Royal Navy's High Angle Control System analogue fire control computer. It first appeared as the FKC MkII in destroyers of the 1938 Tribal class, while later variants were used on sloops, frigates, destroyers, aircraft carriers and several cruisers. The FKC MkII was a non-tachymetric anti-aircraft fire control computer. It could accurately engage targets with a maximum speed of 250 knots (460 km/h; 290 mph).

== Operation ==
The FKC received vertical reference information from a Gyro Level Corrector and aircraft altitude, range, direction, and speed input information from the Rangefinder-Director, and output to the guns the elevation and deflection data needed to hit the target, along with the correct fuze timing information, so that the shells fired would explode in the vicinity of the target aircraft. Most guns controlled by the FKC had Fuze Setting Pedestals or Fuze Setting Trays where the correct fuze timing was set on a clockwork mechanism within the AA shell warhead.

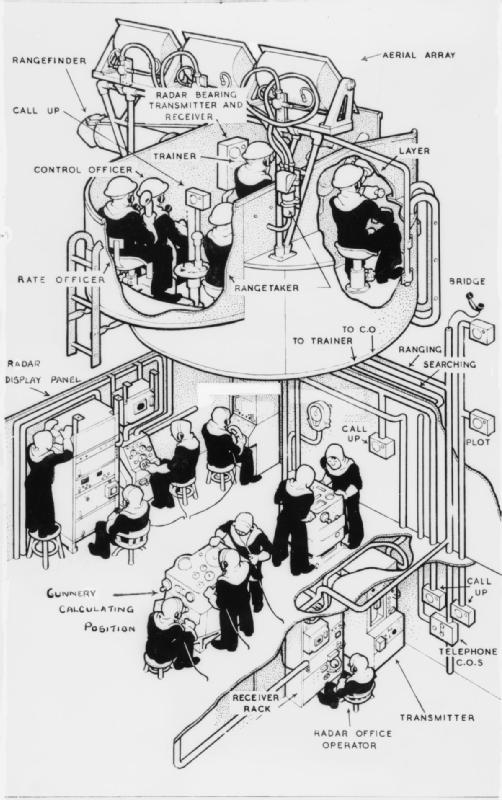
Cut-away view of a destroyer "K" type D.C.T. with Type 285 radar. The below-decks FKC is shown in the centre of the drawing and is labelled "Gunnery Calculating Position", with the deflection operator seated.

== Development ==
Type 285 radar was an early addition to the FKC system, being fitted on new destroyers from mid-1941 onward, and retrofitted to existing destroyers as time and opportunity permitted. Later variants increased the maximum target speed to 500 knots (930 km/h; 580 mph), and were combined with Gyro Rate Units (GRU) which gave tachometric capabilities to the system, and radar which greatly improved ranging and rate keeping accuracy.

== Wartime use ==
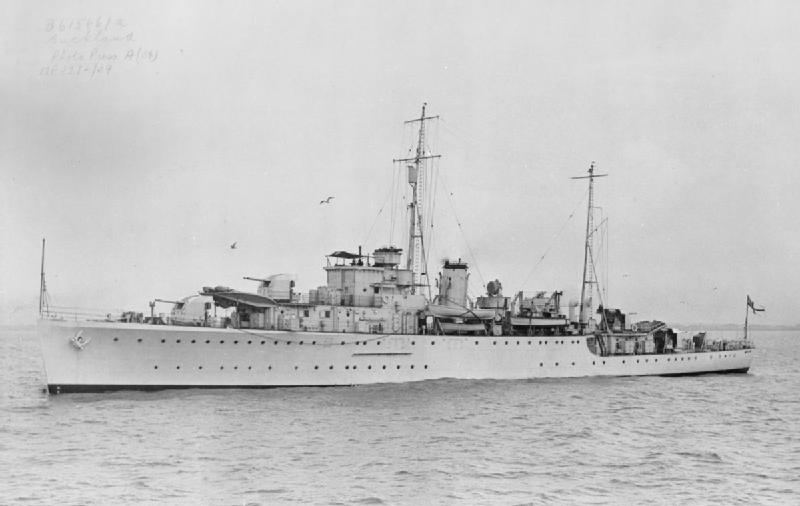
Port view of the sloop HMS Auckland. She is armed with eight 4-inch Mark XVI guns in four twin Mark XIX mountings at A and B positions forward and in X and Y positions aft. They are controlled by the Rangefinder-Director sited behind the bridge which fed targeting information to her FKC located below decks. A Vickers .50 machine gun, quad mount Mk. II, was also fitted.

The FKC saw extensive use during the war on British Commonwealth naval ships, typically on destroyers and sloops. Prior to the widespread use of radar, optical detection and ranging on high altitude aerial targets was a daunting task, as shown by HMAS Parramatta's Report of Proceedings, for 3 September 1940:

Tuesday 3rd September. An air attack by a single Italian machine took place on Aden. I was A/A guard. The Italian aircraft are painted with a light sand under-colour, which at the very high level bombing height favoured (13 to 16,000 feet) merges very successfully into the usual hard bright sky. At times when near the sun, they have been extremely difficult to see.

Occasionally conditions would conspire to favour the surface ships during an aerial attack, as again revealed by HMAS Parramatta's Report of Proceedings, for 20 September 1940:

Saturday 20th September, Two bombing attacks took place on the Convoy. During the first attack bombs were dropped over the convoy at some distance from "Parramatta" and one merchant ship was hit and damaged, although she subsequently reached Aden afloat with assistance from various ships. The Escort engaged the planes without visible results. The second attack took place during the first dog watch. The five Italian planes, inexplicably gave H.M.S. "Auckland" and myself considerable warning by dropping several bombs some miles away before attacking. The remainder of the bombs (about 30) were aimed with obvious intention of attacking the Convoy, but they released early, and the entire outfit fell around "Parramatta". The ship, then nearly stopped getting in the mine-sweeps, was not struck, although there were several near misses. Although splinters flew over us there were no casualties, and the minesweeping party aft calmly continued to get in the sweeps with the after gun firing over their heads and bombs dropping close around them. The Italian planes continued over the Convoy at approximately 14,000 ft and gave H.M.S "Auckland" and myself an unrivalled opportunity for steady firing for some minutes. Two of the aircraft appeared to drop out of formation, one going into a spin. It has been subsequently ascertained that not one of the five aircraft reached home, in fact we had a one hundred per cent success.

The FKC was used throughout the war and its effectiveness was increased by the use of radar for gunnery and to provide warning against surprise attack, as demonstrated by this account of HMAS Warrego bringing down a Japanese A6M Zero fighter aircraft (a "HAMP"), in 1944:

On 18th September H.M.A.S. "WARREGO" was at anchor near Soemoe Soemoe Island (off Morotai Island) and had closed up to dawn action stations at 0530I... Just after 0600 an aircraft appeared in the direction of Bandera Hill... In the next few minutes three aircraft were picked up by radar on the starboard side. Two of these had closed to 9,000 yards when a "HAMP" appeared at Red 75 at a height of about 1,000 feet apparently making a bombing run on the ship. Fire was opened in director barrage firing and the first broadside burst immediately ahead of the aircraft forcing it to bank and to jettison a 100 kilograms (220 lb) bomb. The aircraft passed down the port side at an estimated speed of 340 knots (630 km/h). As this speed exceeded the limits of the fuze keeping clock, aim off was allowed in the director and the bursts, which were at first astern of the aircraft as the range opened, were then close ahead of the target. The port Oerlikons opened fire at the same time as the main armament and, when the aircraft was bearing approximately Red 140, bursts from the after port Oerlikon were seen to enter the target. The "HAMP" was seen to crash approximately one mile west of Dodola Island. This was confirmed later by an American Army Officer serving on Dodola Island and also by a tidal observation party from "WARREGO", camped on Kokova Island.
