= Pom-Pom director =

Royal Navy appointment during World War II

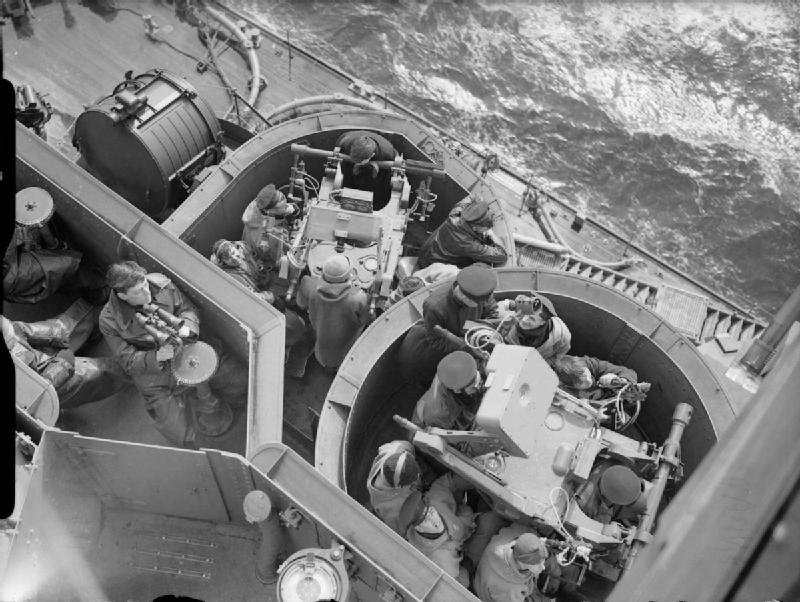
Mark IV Directors on HMS King George V. The large rectangular box centred above the director contains the gyro rate unit. This image was taken early in King George V's career before the addition of Type 282 radar.

"Pom-Pom" director was a director for British anti-aircraft guns on British warships of the 1930s into the Second World War.

== Development ==
The Vickers 40 mm QF 2 pounder "Pom-Pom" gun anti-aircraft mounting was introduced to the Royal Navy in the early 1930s. The multi-barrel mounting was capable of a tremendous volume of fire but the crew had great difficulty in aiming the mounting due to the smoke and vibration created by the guns. It was, therefore, essential to aim the mount from a remote location, using a director that had a clear view, free from smoke and vibration. The director crew would aim at the target aircraft and, in the early versions of the director, cause the layer (altitude) and trainer (azimuth) pointers to rotate on the gun mount. The gun crew would then move the mount to match the pointers rather than having to try and aim at the target aircraft.

== Mark I - III directors ==
Directors I to III controlled the gun mounting through "follow the pointer" control and aimed at aircraft using eye shooting techniques through a simple ring sight. These directors began to appear on Royal Navy cruisers, battleships and aircraft carriers in 1930. They were universally fitted, one per pom-pom gun mounting, by the late 1930s. Most destroyers and smaller ships that carried 2-pounder guns continued to rely on aiming the guns with the on-mount gunsights due to the lack of space on these ships to site a director.

== Director Mark IV ==
The Mk IV director was a considerable improvement and used gyroscopes in a gyro rate unit coupled to an optical rangefinder and Type 282 radar to determine the range, speed and direction of enemy aircraft and then used an on-director computer to produce an accurate fire control solution to hit the target. Later versions of the Mk IV director introduced remote power control (RPC) and could control the gun mounting by remote control from the director. The Mk IV director was fully tachymetric, but performance suffered as the director was not stabilized against the movement of the ship. It consequently required a carefully trained crew (a total of eight including the radar operator in the radar office) to achieve good results. Even so, the Mk IV director was highly advanced and placed the Royal Navy in the forefront of naval anti-aircraft fire control when it was introduced to the Royal Navy on HMS King George V in 1940. Later versions were upgraded with Type 282 radar and RPC beginning in 1941, with HMS Prince of Wales being one of the first ships to receive the radar upgrade, which she first used in action during Operation Halberd.

== See also ==
- List of anti-aircraft guns

== Notes and references ==
- Raven, Alan; Roberts, John (1976). British Battleships of World War Two. Annapolis: Naval Institute Press. ISBN 0-87021-817-4.
