= Tachymetric anti-aircraft fire control system =

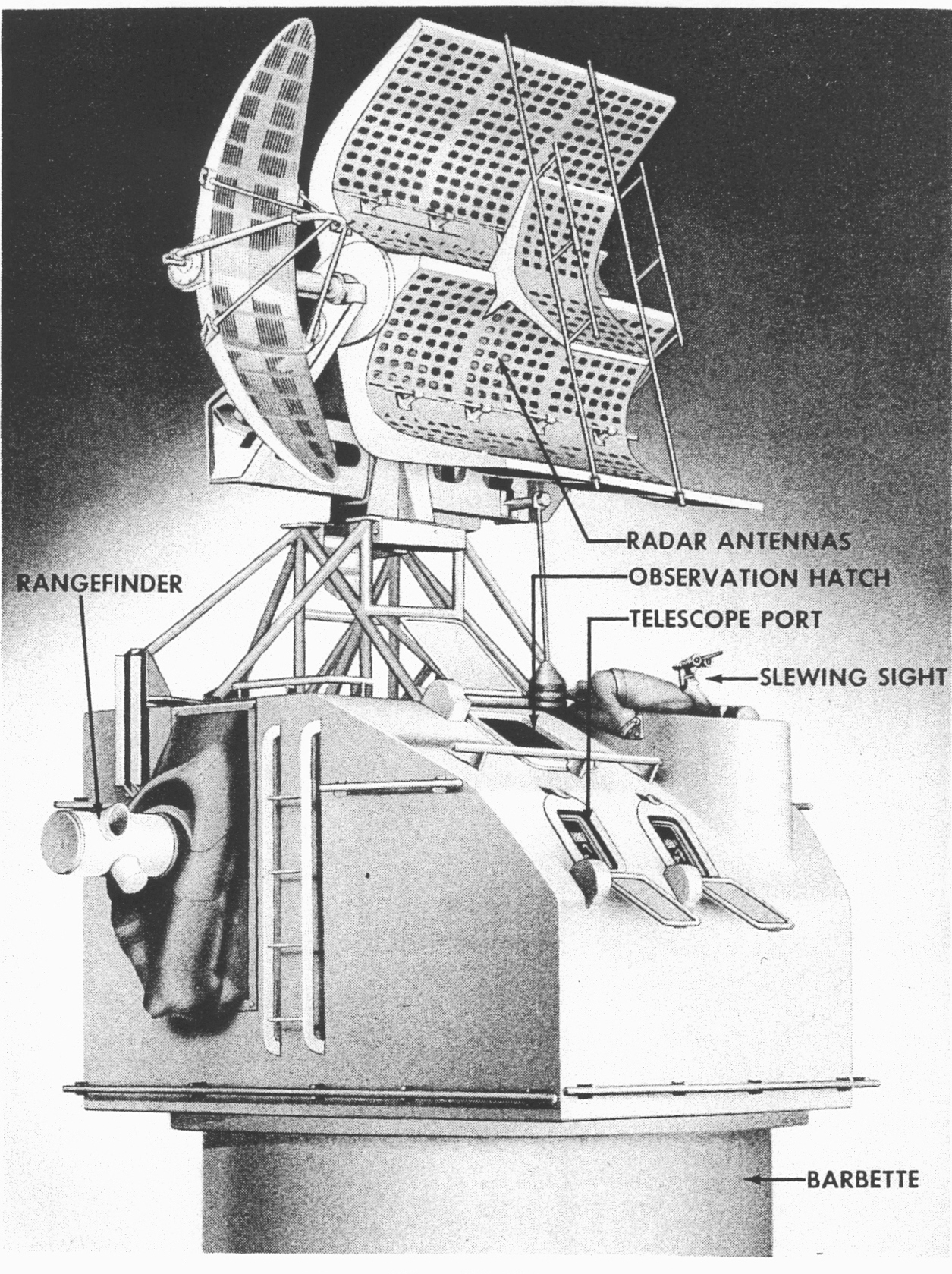
Mark 37 Director c1944 with Mark 12 (rectangular antenna) and Mark 22 "orange peel"

A tachymetric anti-aircraft fire control system generates target position, speed, direction, and rate of target range change, by computing these parameters directly from measured data. The target's range, height and observed bearing data are fed into a computer which uses the measured change in range, height and bearing from successive observations of the target to compute the true range, direction, speed and rate of climb or descent of the target. The computer then calculates the required elevation and bearing of the AA guns to hit the target based upon its predicted movement.

The computers were at first entirely mechanical analog computers utilizing gears and levers to physically perform the calculations of protractors and slide rules, using moving graph charts and markers to provide an estimate of speed and position. Variation of target position over time was accomplished with constant-drive motors to run the mechanical simulation.

The term tachymetric should more properly be spelled as "tachometric" which comes from the Greek "takhos" = speed, and "metric" = measure, hence tachometric, to measure speed.

An alternative, non-tachometric, gonometric method of AA prediction is for specially trained observers to estimate the course and speed of the target manually and feed these estimates, along with the measured bearing and range data, into the AA fire control computer which then generates change of bearing rate and change of range data, and passes them back to the observer, typically by a "follow the pointer", indicator of predicted target elevation and bearing or by remote power control of the observer's optical instruments. The observer then corrects the estimate, creating a feedback loop, by comparing the observed target motion against the computer generated motion of his optical sights. When the sights stay on the target, the estimated speed, range, and change of rate data can be considered correct.

An example of tachometric AA fire control would be the USN Mk 37 system. The early RN High Angle Control System (HACS) I through IV and the early Fuze Keeping Clock (FKC) were examples of non-tachometric systems.

By 1940 the RN was adding a Gyro Rate Unit (GRU) which fed bearing and elevation data to a Gyro Rate Unit Box computer (GRUB), which also received ranging data to calculate target speed and direction directly, and this tachometric data was then fed directly to the HACS fire control computer, converting the HACS into a tachometric system.
