= Convoy JW 51B =

Arctic convoy during the Second World War

- Part of the Second World War
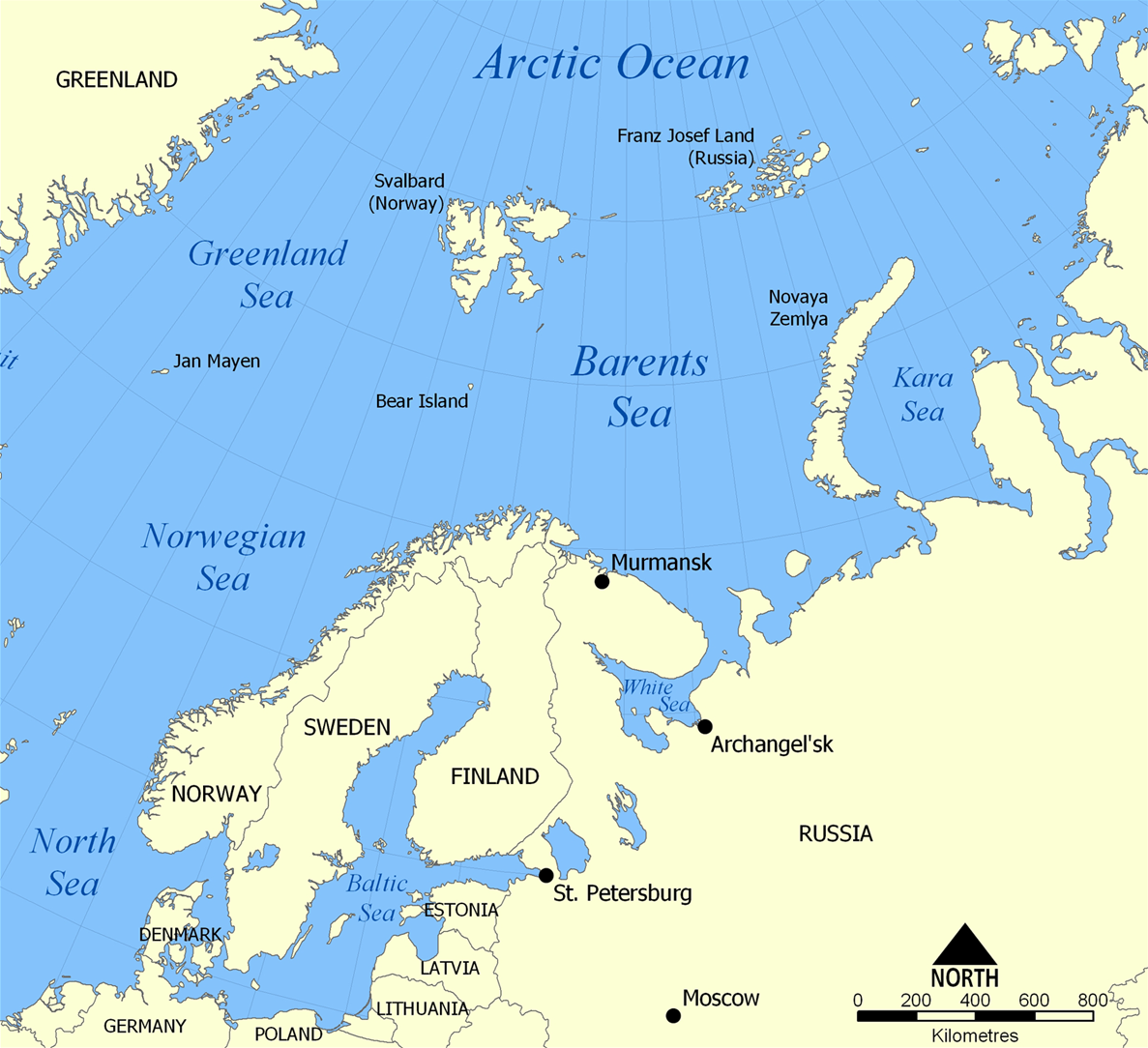
- The Norwegian and the Barents seas, site of the Arctic convoys
Date	30 December 1942 – 3 January 1943
Location	Arctic Ocean
Result	British victory

Belligerents
United Kingdom; The Netherlands; Poland	Germany

Commanders and leaders
John Tovey; Robert Burnett; Robert Sherbrooke (WIA); Convoy commodore: Robin Melhuish	Karl Dönitz; Oskar Kummetz; Hans-Jürgen Stumpff

Strength
2 light cruisers (after 3 hours); 6 destroyers; 2 corvettes; 1 minesweeper; 2 ASW trawlers	2 heavy cruisers; 6 destroyers

Casualties and losses
250 killed; 1 destroyer sunk; 1 destroyer damaged; 1 minesweeper sunk	330 killed; 1 cruiser damaged; 1 destroyer sunk

Convoy JW 51B (30 December 1942 – 3 January 1943) was an Arctic convoy sent from Scotland by the Western Allies to aid the Soviet Union during the Second World War.

On 31 December, Convoy JW 51B was attacked by German ships in Operation Regenbogen (Unternehmen Regenbogen) a plan to intercept the next British convoy to Murmansk.

A British minesweeper and a British destroyer and a German destroyer were sunk; no ships were lost from the convoy in what became known as the Battle of the Barents Sea.

== Background ==
=== Convoy escorts ===
Convoy JW 51B consisted of 15 merchant ships that departed from Loch Ewe on 22 December 1942. Close escort was provided by the minesweeper HMS Bramble, two corvettes and two armed trawlers. The close escort was supported by six Home Fleet destroyers led by HMS Onslow (Captain Robert Sherbrooke). The convoy sailed with a local escort group from Scotland and was joined later by the Eastern Local Escort from Murmansk. A cruiser cover force comprising HMS Jamaica, HMS Sheffield and two destroyers, was also at sea, from Kola Inlet, to guard against attack by German ships. Distant cover was provided by the heavy cover from Iceland comprising the battleship HMS Anson, the cruiser HMS Cumberland and five destroyers.

=== German forces ===
Convoy JW 51B was opposed by four U-boats in a patrol line in the Norwegian Sea and the aircraft of Luftflotte 5 based in Norway. A surface force comprising the heavy cruisers Admiral Hipper, Lützow and the destroyers Z4 Richard Beitzen, Z6 Theodor Riedel, Z16 Friedrich Eckoldt, Z29, Z30 and Z31 was stationed at Altenfjord.

== Prelude ==
Convoy JW 51B departed Loch Ewe on 22 December 1942, accompanied by the Western Local eEcort,of four destroyers and its close escort. Three days later, on 25 December, it was joined by the ocean escort and the Western Local Escort departed. On 27 December the convoy ran into a gale, which scattered the convoy over the next two days into several groups across a wide area. Dover Hill was forced to return with weather damage and five ships and two escorts had become separated. Three of the ships rejoined on 30 December but Chester Valley, in company with the armed trawler Vizalma, and another, with the destroyer Oribi, remained separated. During 30 December, Bramble detached from the main body of the convoy to search for the stragglers.

== Action ==
On 24 December the convoy had been sighted by a patrolling aircraft but was lost later during the storm. On 30 December it was found again by U-354 and Unternehmen Regenbogen began. On 31 December the German ships, in two sections, met the ocean escort of Convoy JW 51B, and after a sharp engagement, which left the minesweeper Bramble and the destroyer Achates sinking and Onslow, damaged; the attacking force was driven off. The destroyer, Eckoldt was sunk and the cruiser Hipper was damaged. There were no further attacks and on 1 January 1943 Vizalma and her charge rejoined the convoy. On 2 January Convoy JW 51B was met by the Eastern Local Escort, two minesweepers from Murmansk. On 3 January the main body arrived in the [[Kola Ba|Kola Inlet}}, joined the following day by Oribi and her charge.

== Aftermath ==
=== Analysis ===
The 15 ships of Convoy JW 51B arrived at Murmansk without loss, though one had been damaged. Despite the loss of two warships, the convoy was a success and the failure of the German surface force against the convoy caused a loss of confidence by Hitler in the Kriegsmarine and its commander, Admiral Erich Raeder, which led to him resigning. Thereafter, the main threat to the Allied convoy system was from U-boats.

== Allied order of battle ==
=== Merchant ships ===
Freighters, 22 December 1942 – 4 January 1943
Name	Year	Flag	GRT	Notes
SS Ballot	1922	Panama	6,131	
SS Calobre	1919	Panama	6,891	
SS Chester Valley	1919	United States	5,078	
SS Daldorch	1930	Merchant Navy	5,571	
SS Dover Hill	1918	Merchant Navy	5,815	
SS Empire Archer	1942	Merchant Navy	7,031	Captain Robin Melhuish, convoy commodore
SS Empire Emerald	1941	Merchant Navy	8,032	
SS Executive	1920	United States	4,978	
SS Jefferson Myers	1920	United States	7,582	
SS John H. B. Latrobe	1942	United States	7,191	
SS Pontfield	1940	Merchant Navy	8,319	
SS Puerto Rican	1919	United States	6,076	
SS Ralph Waldo Emerson	1942	United States	7,176	
SS Vermont	1919	United States	5,670	
SS Yorkmar	1919	United States	5,612	

=== Escort forces ===
Western local escort
Name	Flag	Type	Notes
HMS Bulldog	Royal Navy	B-class destroyer	22–23 December 1942
HMS Blankney	Royal Navy	Hunt-class destroyer	22–25 December 1942
HMS Chiddingfold	Royal Navy	Hunt-class destroyer	22–25 December 1942
HMS Ledbury	Royal Navy	Hunt-class destroyer	22–25 December 1942
Close convoy escort
HMS Hyderabad	Royal Navy	Flower-class corvette	22 December 1942 – 4 January 1943
HMS Rhododendron	Royal Navy	Flower-class corvette	22 December 1942 – 4 January 1943
HMS Bramble	Royal Navy	Halcyon-class minesweeper	22–29 December 1942
HMT Northern Gem	Royal Navy	ASW trawler	22 December 1942 – 4 January 1943
HMT Vizalma	Royal Navy	ASW trawler	22 December 1942 – 4 January 1943
Oceanic escort
HMS Achates	Royal Navy	A-class destroyer	25 December 1942 – 3 January
HMS Obdurate	Royal Navy	O-class destroyer	25 December – 3 January 1943
HMS Obedient	Royal Navy	O-class destroyer	25 December – 3 January 1943
HMS Onslow	Royal Navy	O-class destroyer	25 December – 3 January 1943
HMS Oribi	Royal Navy	O-class destroyer	25–31 December 1942, separated
HMS Orwell	Royal Navy	O-class destroyer	25 December – 3 January 1943
Cruiser covering force (Force R)
HMS Jamaica	Royal Navy	Fiji-class cruiser	27–31 December 1942, from Kola Inlet
HMS Sheffield	Royal Navy	Town-class cruiser	27–31 December 1942, from Kola Inlet
HMS Matchless	Royal Navy	M-class destroyer	27–29 December 1942, from Kola Inlet
HMS Opportune	Royal Navy	O-class destroyer	27–29 December 1942, from Kola Inlet
Distant cover (Home Fleet)
HMS Anson	Royal Navy	King George V-class battleship	
HMS Cumberland	Royal Navy	County-class cruiser	
HMS Forester	Royal Navy	F-class destroyer	
HMS Icarus	Royal Navy	I-class destroyer	
HMS Impulsive	Royal Navy	I-class destroyer	
HMS Blankney	Royal Navy	Hunt-class destroyer	
HMS Chiddingfold	Royal Navy	Hunt-class destroyer	
Allied submarine patrols
HMS Sea Nymph	Royal Navy	S-class submarine	Patrolled vicinity Bear Island
HMS Taurus	Royal Navy	T-class submarine	Patrolled vicinity Bear Island
HMS Torbay	Royal Navy	T-class submarine	Patrolled vicinity Bear Island
ORP Sokół	Polish Navy	U-class submarine	Patrolled vicinity Bear Island
HMS Trespasser	Royal Navy	T-class submarine	Norway inshore watch
HMS Seadog	Royal Navy	S-class submarine	Norway inshore watch
HMS Unruly	Royal Navy	U-class submarine	Norway inshore watch
HMS Graph	Royal Navy	Type VIIC submarine	Norway inshore watch
O 14	Royal Netherlands Navy	O 12-class submarine	Norway inshore watch

== German order of battle ==
=== Kriegsmarine ===
Boat	Flag	Class	Notes
U-boats
U-354	Kriegsmarine	Type VIIC submarine	
U-626	Kriegsmarine	Type VIIC submarine	
Unternehmen Regenbogen
Admiral Hipper	Kriegsmarine	Admiral Hipper-class cruiser	Sailed 30 December 1942
Lützow	Kriegsmarine	Deutschland-class cruiser	Sailed 30 December 1942
Z16 Friedrich Eckoldt	Kriegsmarine	Type 1934A-class destroyer	Sailed 30 December 1942
Z4 Richard Beitzen	Kriegsmarine	Type 1934-class destroyer	Sailed 30 December 1942
Z6 Theodor Riedel	Kriegsmarine	Type 1934A-class destroyer	Sailed 30 December 1942
Z29	Kriegsmarine	Type 1936A-class destroyer	Sailed 30 December 1942
Z30	Kriegsmarine	Type 1936A-class destroyer	Sailed 30 December 1942
Z31	Kriegsmarine	Type 1936A-class destroyer	Sailed 30 December 1942
