= HMS Orwell (G98) =

O-class destroyer converted to Type 16 frigate of the Royal Navy

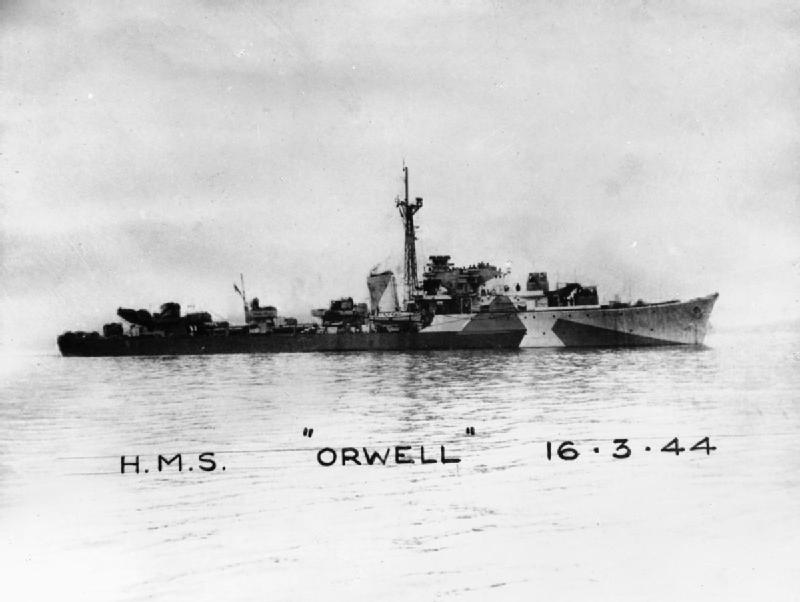

History

United Kingdom
- Name: Orwell
- Ordered: 3 September 1939
- Builder: Thornycroft (Southampton)
- Laid down: 20 May 1940
- Launched: 2 April 1942
- Commissioned: 17 October 1942
- Identification: Pennant number G98
- Fate: Broken up, 1965
- Badge

General characteristics
- Class & type: O-class destroyer
- Displacement: 1,610 long tons (1,640 t) (standard)
- Length: 345 ft (105.2 m) (o/a)
- Beam: 35 ft (10.7 m)
- Draught: 13 ft 6 in (4.1 m)
- Installed power: 2 × Admiralty 3-drum boilers; 40,000 shp (29,828 kW)
- Propulsion: 2 × shafts; 2 × geared steam turbines
- Speed: 37 knots (69 km/h; 43 mph)
- Range: 3,850 nmi (7,130 km; 4,430 mi) at 20 knots (37 km/h; 23 mph)
- Complement: 176+
- Armament: 4 × single QF 4 in (102 mm) AA gun; 1 × quad 2 pdr (40 mm (1.6 in)) AA gun; 4 × single 20 mm (0.8 in) AA guns; 2 × quadruple 21 in (533 mm) torpedo tubes; 2 × depth charges throwers; 60 × mines

General characteristics as Type 16 class
- Class & type: Type 16 frigate
- Displacement: 1,800 long tons (1,800 t) standard; 2,300 long tons (2,300 t) full load
- Length: 362 ft 9 in (110.57 m) o/a
- Beam: 37 ft 9 in (11.51 m)
- Draught: 14 ft 6 in (4.42 m)
- Propulsion: 2 × Admiralty 3-drum boilers; Steam turbines, 40,000 shp; 2 shafts
- Speed: 32 knots (37 mph; 59 km/h) full load
- Complement: 175
- Sensors & processing systems: Type 293Q target indication Radar; Type 974 navigation Radar; Type 1010 Cossor Mark 10 IFF; Type 146B search Sonar; Type 147 depth finder Sonar; Type 162 target classification Sonar; Type 174 attack Sonar
- Armament: 1 × twin QF 4-inch (102 mm) gun Mk XVI; 1 × twin 40 mm Bofors gun Mk.5; 5 × single 40 mm Bofors gun Mk.9; 2 × Squid A/S mortar; 1 × quad 21-inch (533 mm) tubes for Mk.9 torpedoes

Service record
- Operations: Battle of the Barents Sea (1942); Battle of North Cape (1943)

HMS Orwell was an O-class destroyer of the Royal Navy that entered service in 1942 and was broken up in 1965.

== Design ==
The O-class (and the following P-class) were designed prior to the outbreak of the Second World War to meet the Royal Navy's need for large numbers of destroyers in the event of war occurring. They were an intermediate between the large destroyers designed for fleet operations (such as the Tribal-class) and the smaller and slower Hunt-class escort destroyers.

Orwell was 345 ft (105.16 m) long overall, 337 ft (102.72 m) at the waterline and 328 ft 9 in (100.20 m) between perpendiculars, with a beam of 35 ft (10.67 m) and a draught of 9 ft (2.74 m) mean and 13 ft 6 in (4.11 m) full load. Displacement was 1,540 long tons (1,560 t) standard and 2,270 long tons (2,310 t) full load. Two Admiralty three-drum boilers fed steam at 300 psi (2,100 kPa) and 620 °F (327 °C) to two sets of Parsons single-reduction geared steam turbines which drove two propeller shafts. The machinery was rated at 40,000 shp (30,000 kW) giving a maximum speed of 36.75 kn (42.3 mph; 68.1 km/h), corresponding to 33 kn (38 mph; 61 km/h) at deep load. 500 long tons (510 t) of oil was carried, giving a radius of 3,850 nmi (4,430 mi; 7,130 km) at 20 kn (23 mph; 37 km/h). Orwell had a crew of 175–176 officers and other ranks.

The O-class were planned to have an armament of four 4.7-inch (120 mm) guns and two quadruple 21-inch (533mm) torpedo tubes, but in March 1941, it was decided to complete four O-class destroyers, including Orwell for minelaying. As such Orwell had a revised armament of four 4-inch (102 mm) anti-aircraft guns, with a close-in anti-aircraft armament of a quadruple 2-pounder "pom-pom" mount together with four single Oerlikon 20 mm cannon, with two on the bridge wings and two further aft abreast the aft superstructure, and 2 twin power-operated 0.5-inch (12.7 mm) machine guns. Two of the single Oerlikons were later replaced by twin mounts. Two quadruple torpedo tubes were fitted, while anti-submarine armament consisted of four depth charge throwers, with 60 depth charges carried. (Note: 70 depth charges according to Conway's.) When used for minelaying, one 4-inch gun and both sets of torpedo-tubes were removed to allow mine rails and 50–60 mines to be carried. In practice, stability concerns limited the weight of mines that could be carried, with increasing topweight as the ship was modified during the war reducing the practicable payload to 40 mines by 1945.

== Construction ==
The ship was one of eight destroyers ordered by the British Admiralty on 3 September 1939 as part of the 1st Emergency Flotilla, at a contract price of £410,872 (excluding government provided equipment such as armament). The name Oliver was originally proposed, but this was rejected and the ship was called Orwell instead, after the river of that name. Orwell was laid down at John I. Thornycroft & Company's, Woolston, Southampton shipyard on 20 May 1940, was launched on 2 April 1942 and completed on 17 October 1942.

== Second World War service ==
After completion, Orwell joined the 17th Destroyer Flotilla of the Home Fleet. The flotilla was heavily deployed in Arctic waters, with Orwell's first Arctic convoy being the westbound (Arkhangelsk, Russia to Loch Ewe, Scotland) QP 15, with Orwell forming part of the escort from 23 to 30 November 1942. In December 1942, Orwell took part in Arctic Convoy JW 51B, joining the convoy on 25 December. On 30 December, the convoy was spotted by the German submarine U-354, and in response a German force consisting of the heavy cruisers Lützow and Admiral Hipper and six destroyers set out from Altafjord to intercept the convoy. The Germans attacked on 31 December, in the Battle of the Barents Sea. The five destroyers of the escort managed to keep the German forces from attacking the merchant ships of the convoy until the arrival of the British covering cruiser force of Sheffield and Jamaica caused the Germans to break off the engagement. The convoy had been saved, with the British losing the destroyer Achates and the minesweeper Bramble and the Germans losing the destroyer Friedrich Eckoldt. Orwell was undamaged.

From 19 to 27 February 1943, Orwell was part of the escort for Convoy JW 53. The convoy encountered extreme severe weather, which forced six merchant ships, the cruiser Sheffield and the escort carrier Dasher to turn back, but also prevented German forces from making effective attacks, with no merchant ships being sunk. Orwell sailed with the return convoy, RA 53 which left Kola Bay on 1 March, leaving the convoy on 10 March. Three ships of the convoy were sunk by German U-boats, while a fourth ship foundered. Heavy losses to German submarine attacks in March resulted in destroyers being detached from the home Fleet and attached to Western Approaches Command, to be used to form new Escort Groups to provide additional support to convoys being attacked by enemy submarines, with Orwell joining the 3rd Escort Group. Orwell reinforced Convoy SC 123 and Convoy HX 230 in March 1943. From 8 April to 12 May 1943, Orwell was refitted at a commercial shipyard at Hull, and then returned to the Home Fleet.

In September 1943, Orwell was again attached to Western Approaches Command. Late that month, Orwell, as part of Escort Group 10, (Note: Support Group 10 according to Blair and Mason.) reinforced the westbound Convoy ONS 19 as it passed to the north of the large wolfpack of German submarines, Rossbach, and then transferred to strengthen the escort of eastbound Convoy SC 143 as it approached the Rossbach wolfpack. The destroyer Orkan and one merchant ship were sunk, with three U-boats sunk and one damaged by aircraft supporting the convoy. Orwell and the destroyers Oribi and Musketeer, picked up the survivors from U-643, sunk by RAF Liberator aircraft on 8 October. Later that month, Orwell, together with the American cruiser USS Tuscaloosa and destroyer USS Fitch and the British destroyers Oribi and Onslaught, took part in Operation FQ, the relief of the survivors of the garrison on Svalbard after the German attack, arriving at Svalbard on 19 October.

From 15 November 1943 to 25 November, Orwell escorted the Arctic Convoy Convoy JW 54A to Kola Bay, and from 28 November to 5 December 1944, formed part of the return Convoy RA 54B. Neither convoy was detected by the Germans. From 22 to 29 December, Orwell formed part of the ocean escort for Convoy JW 55B. An attempt by the German battleship Scharnhorst to attack the convoy resulted in the Battle of the North Cape on 26 December, when Scharnhorst was sunk by the battleship Duke of York. The convoy itself was not affected. Orwell returned to Britain as part of the escort of Convoy RA 55B from 1 January to 7 January 1944. Orwell was refitted again at Hull from 2 February to 13 March 1944 before returning to Arctic convoy duty, escorting Convoy JW 58 from 29 March to 4 April, and the return Convoy RA 58 from 7 to 13 April 1944.

On 23 April 1944, the 17th Flotilla, including Orwell, deployed to Plymouth to prepare for the upcoming Allied invasion of France. On the night of 27/28 April 1944, nine German S-boats (motor torpedo boats) attacked a convoy of American landing craft on exercise in Lyme Bay, sinking two and damaging another. Orwell and sister-ship Offa clashed with the withdrawing S-boats after the attack, but the German boats managed to escape unharmed behind a smoke-screen. The Invasion of Normandy on 6 June 1944, saw Onslow patrolling to the east of the invasion area. Orwell remained on duties protecting the Normandy beachhead and invasion traffic until September, when she rejoined the Home Fleet. Later that month. Orwell and Obedient escorted the cruiser Jamaica on another supply run to Svalbard. From 22 to 28 October Orwell formed part of the escort for Arctic Convoy JW 61, and she sailed with the return convoy RA 61 from 2 to 7 November 1944. On 29 November 1944, Orwell collided with the submarine Volatile, sustaining minor damage. The damage sustained did not prevent Orwell from joining the escort for Convoy JW 62 on 1 December 1944, or from escorting the return convoy, RA 62 from 10 to 18 December 1944.

On 11–12 January 1945, Orwell accompanied the cruisers Norfolk and Bellona and the destroyers Onslow and Onslaught on Operation Spellbinder, an anti-shipping sweep off the coast of Norway. They attacked a German convoy off Egersund, sinking the minesweeper M-273 and shelling the merchant ships Bahia Camarones and Charlotte, which were abandoned and sank. On 6 February, Orwell joined Arctic Convoy JW 64, which came under heavy air and submarine attack, with Onslow claiming one German aircraft shot down on 10 February (in total 13 German aircraft were claimed by the convoy's defences), while the corvette Denbigh Castle was sunk by U-992. From 17 to 23 February, Orwell escorted the return Convoy RA 64. On 1 March 1945, Orwell, along with Opportune and Obedient were converted to minelaying configuration, and laid mines extending the British minefields in the Irish Sea on 10 March. From 12 March to 20 May, Orwell escorted Arctic Convoy JW 65, which came under U-boat attack off the entry to Kola Bay, with two merchant ships and the sloop Lapwing sunk, and the return Convoy RA 65 from 23 to 30 March. German U-boats waiting off the entrance to Kola Bay were difficult to counter, as acoustic conditions made detection difficult, and agreement was made between Britain and the Soviet Union to lay a deep minefield in the approaches to Kola Bay, so that surface ships would be unaffected, but deeply submerged submarines avoiding detection would be caught. On 17 April 1945, the fast minelayer Apollo and the destroyers Orwell, Obedient and Opportune set out from Scapa Flow on Operation Trammel, with the cruiser Dido providing anti-aircraft cover. The force arrived at Kola on 20 April, and laid the minefield of 276 mines on 22 April.

== Postwar service ==
In February 1946 Orwell relieved the destroyer Zetland on torpedo training and experimental duties as a member of the Portsmouth local flotilla. In December 1947 she was paid off into Category B2 reserve at Harwich. (Note: Category B2 reserve was Extended Reserve, where, while the ship was preserved for future use, it would require an extensive refit before re-entering service.) Orwell was offered for sale to Pakistan but was rejected as Pakistan required ships armed with 4.7 inch guns, with Onslow and Offa being sold instead. In 1949–50 the destroyer underwent a refit at the shipyard of J. Samuel White at Cowes on the Isle of Wight, and from March 1950 was held at Category C reserve at Chatham. (Note: Category C reserve was a revised category of Extended Reserve introduced in 1949, where the ship would not be commissioned until a post-mobilisation expansion of the Navy.)

In 1952 she was converted to a Type 16 frigate at Rosyth Dockyard, recommissioning on 26 January 1953, and joining the Plymouth local flotilla. In June 1953 she took part in the Fleet Review to celebrate the Coronation of Queen Elizabeth II. Between 1953 and 1958 she was Captain (Destroyers) at Plymouth. On 29 July 1956, the sail training ship Moyana got into difficulties in severe weather in the English Channel, and sent out distress signals. As a response, Orwell, duty destroyer at Plymouth, was sent out. Moyana was spotted by an RAF Shackleton patrol aircraft and the merchant ship Clan Maclean took off Moyana's crew. Orwell took Moyana under tow, but the sailing ship foundered 60 nmi (69 mi; 110 km) south of Plymouth. On 28 November 1958, Orwell collided with the survey ship Vidal. She was reduced to reserve in February 1959 at Rosyth. Later that year, (Note: April–June according to English, and December according to Critchley.) Orwell underwent refit at Rosyth, being held in reserve there until 1961. Between 1961 and 1963 the frigate was held on reserve at Portsmouth, before being placed on the disposal list.

She was sold for scrap to John Cashmore Ltd and arrived for breaking up at Newport on 28 June 1965.
