= HMS Jamaica (44) =

Fiji-class cruiser

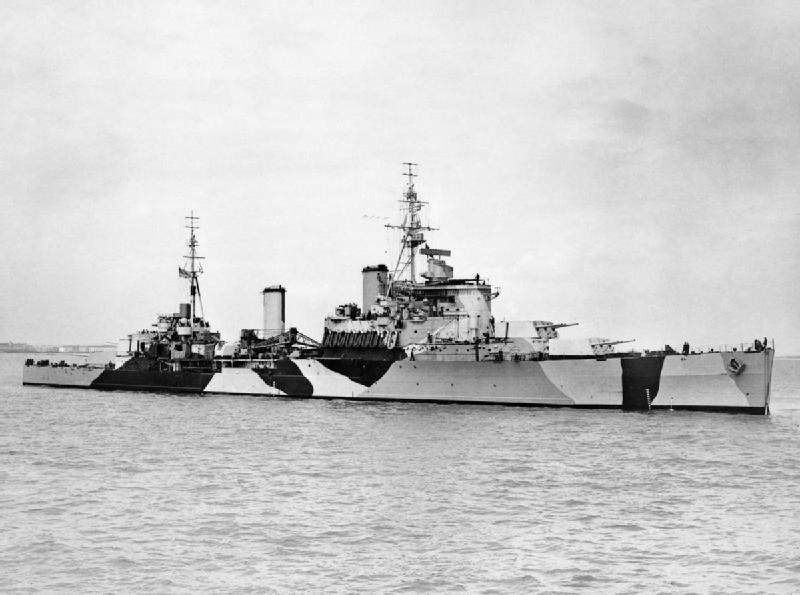
- Jamaica at anchor, 18 September 1943

History

United Kingdom
- Name: Jamaica
- Namesake: Crown Colony of Jamaica and Dependencies
- Ordered: 1938 Naval Programme
- Builder: Vickers-Armstrongs, Barrow-in-Furness
- Laid down: 28 April 1939
- Launched: 16 November 1940
- Commissioned: 29 June 1942
- Decommissioned: 20 November 1957
- Stricken: 1960
- Identification: Pennant number: 44
- Motto: Non sibi sed patriae; (Latin: "Not for oneself, but for one's country")
- Nickname(s): 'The Fighting J', 'The Galloping Ghost of the North Korean Coast'
- Fate: Sold for scrap, 14 November 1960

General characteristics (as built)
- Class & type: Fiji-class light cruiser
- Displacement: 8,631 long tons (8,770 t) (standard)
- Length: 555 ft 6 in (169.3 m)
- Beam: 62 ft (18.9 m)
- Draught: 19 ft 10 in (6 m)
- Installed power: 4 Admiralty 3-drum boilers; 80,000 shp (60,000 kW)
- Propulsion: 4 shafts; 4 geared steam turbine sets
- Speed: 32.25 knots (59.73 km/h; 37.11 mph)
- Range: 6,250 nmi (11,580 km; 7,190 mi) at 13 knots (24 km/h; 15 mph)
- Complement: 733 (peacetime), 900 (wartime)
- Armament: 4 × triple 6 in (152 mm) guns; 4 × twin 4 in (102 mm) DP guns; 2 × quadruple 2-pdr (40 mm (1.6 in)) AA guns; 10 × single 20 mm (0.8 in) Oerlikon AA guns; 2 × triple 21 in (533 mm) torpedo tubes
- Armour: Engine and boiler rooms: 3.25 in (83 mm); Decks: 2–3.5 in (51–89 mm); Magazines: 2–3.5 in (51–89 mm); Gun turrets: 1–2 in (25–51 mm)
- Aircraft carried: 2 × seaplanes
- Aviation facilities: 1 × catapult, 2 × hangars

HMS Jamaica, a Fiji-class cruiser of the Royal Navy, was named after the island of Jamaica, which was a British Crown Colony when she was built in the late 1930s. The light cruiser spent almost her entire wartime career on Arctic convoy duties, except for a deployment south for the landings in North Africa in November 1942. She participated in the Battle of the Barents Sea in 1942 and the Battle of North Cape in 1943. Jamaica escorted several aircraft carriers in 1944 as they flew off airstrikes that attacked the German battleship Tirpitz in northern Norway. Late in the year she had an extensive refit to prepare her for service with the British Pacific Fleet, but the war ended before she reached the Pacific.

Jamaica spent the late 1940s in the Far East and on the North America and West Indies Station. When the Korean War began in 1950 she was ordered, in cooperation with the United States Navy, to bombard North Korean troops as they advanced down the eastern coast. The ship also provided fire support during the Inchon Landing later that year. Jamaica was refitted late in the year and returned to Great Britain in early 1951 where she was placed in reserve.

She was recommissioned in 1954 for service with the Mediterranean Fleet. In 1955 Jamaica was used to play the cruiser HMS Exeter in the film Battle of the River Plate, in company with her wartime partner HMS Sheffield as HMS Ajax. In 1956 the ship participated in Operation Musketeer, the Anglo-French invasion of Egypt to seize control of the Suez Canal. Jamaica was paid off in 1958 and sold for scrap in 1960.

== Description ==
The Fiji-class ships had an overall length of 555 feet 6 inches (169.3 m), a beam of 68 feet 5 inches (20.9 m) and a draught of 19 feet 10 inches (6 m). Jamaica displaced 8,631 long tons (8,770 t) at standard load. The ships were powered by four Parsons geared steam turbine sets, each driving one shaft, using steam provided by four Admiralty 3-drum boilers. The turbines developed a total of 80,000 shaft horsepower (60,000 kW) and gave a maximum speed of 32.25 knots (59.73 km/h; 37.11 mph). The Fiji class carried a maximum of 1,700 long tons (1,700 t) of fuel oil that gave them a range of 6,520 nautical miles (12,080 km; 7,500 mi) at 13 knots (24 km/h; 15 mph). The ships' complement was 733 officers and men in peacetime and 900 during war.

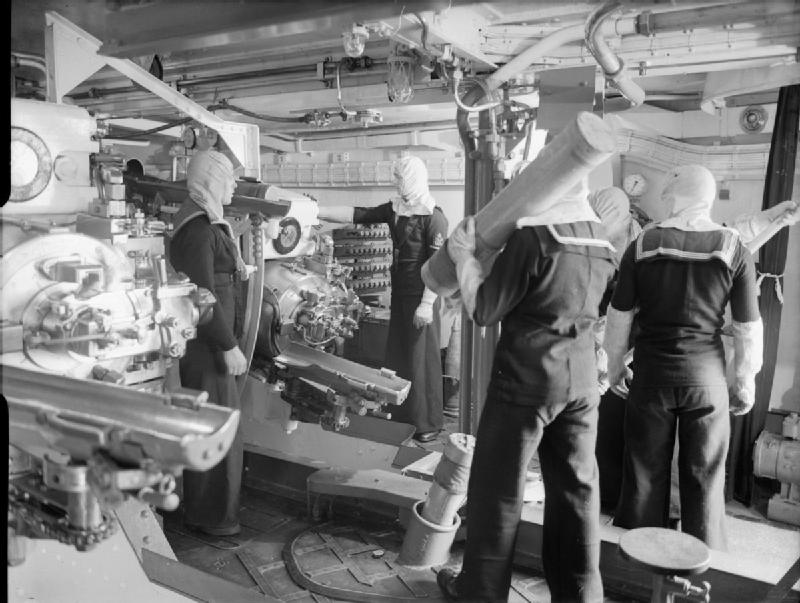
The interior of a 6-inch triple Mark XXIII mounting on board Jamaica. The crew are wearing anti-flash gear and the crewman in the foreground has over his shoulder a 30-pound (14 kg) cordite propellant charge.

The armament of the Fiji-class ships consisted of a dozen 6-inch (152 mm) Mk XXIII guns in four three-gun turrets, one superfiring pair fore and aft of the superstructure. Their secondary armament consisted of eight 4-inch (102 mm) Mk XVI dual-purpose guns in four twin turrets. Close-range anti-aircraft defence was provided by two quadruple 2-pounder (40 mm) ("pom-poms") AA gun mounts and ten single mounts for 20-millimeter (0.8 in) Oerlikon guns. They also carried two above-water triple torpedo tube mounts for 21-inch (533 mm) torpedoes.

The Fiji class lacked a full waterline armour belt. The sides of their boiler and engine rooms and the magazines were protected by 3.25–3.5 inches (83–89 mm) of armour. The deck over the propulsion machinery spaces and magazines was reinforced to a thickness of 2–3.5 inches (51–89 mm). They carried an aircraft catapult and two Supermarine Sea Otter or Walrus seaplanes.

== History ==
Jamaica was laid down on 28 April 1939 by Vickers-Armstrongs in Barrow-in-Furness, England as part of the 1938 Naval Programme and named for the British colony of Jamaica. The ship was launched on 16 November 1940 and completed on 29 June 1942. After working up, the ship provided distant cover to Convoy PQ 18 in September. She was assigned to the Centre Task Force of Operation Torch in early November and was unsuccessfully attacked by the Vichy French submarine Fresnel. The Arctic convoys had been suspended at PQ 18, but were scheduled to resume on 15 December with Convoy JW 51A. Jamaica and Sheffield, with several escorting destroyers, formed Force R under the command of Rear-Admiral Robert Burnett and were tasked to cover the convoy against any German surface ships. The convoy was not spotted by the Germans and arrived at the Kola Inlet without incident on 25 December.

=== Battle of the Barents Sea ===
Force R sailed from Kola on 27 December to rendezvous with Convoy JW 51B in the Norwegian Sea, but the convoy had been blown southwards by a major storm. Several of its ships had been separated during storm and they confused the radar of Force R's ships as to the true location of the convoy. Thus Force R was 30 miles (48 km) north of the convoy on the morning of 31 December when the heavy cruiser Admiral Hipper attacked the convoy. Admiral Hipper was first held at bay by the British destroyers HMS Onslow, HMS Obedient, HMS Obdurate and HMS Orwell. Initially driven off, Admiral Hipper returned, only to be engaged by Force R shortly before noon and was hit by three 6-inch shells from the cruisers. Two German destroyers, Z16 Friedrich Eckoldt and Z4 Richard Beitzen, misidentified Sheffield as Admiral Hipper and attempted to form up on her. Sheffield sank Friedrich Eckoldt at a range of 2 miles (3.2 km) while Jamaica unsuccessfully engaged Richard Beitzen. Less than an hour later Force R spotted the pocket battleship Lutzow and Admiral Hipper and opened fire. Neither side scored any hits in the darkness before both sides turned away a few minutes later. Force R continued to track the German ships for several hours before they lost contact. Although the destroyer HMS Achates and the minesweeper HMS Bramble were sunk by the Kriegsmarine, the convoy reached the Kola Inlet intact. Force R remained at sea to protect Convoy RA 51 that was returning to Great Britain until relieved by HMS Berwick and HMS Kent.

Jamaica rejoined the Home Fleet at the beginning of 1943 and received six twin power-operated 20-millimetre (0.8 in) AA guns as well as four single guns some time during the year. During November she protected the convoys RA 53B, JW 54A, JW 54B and RA 54B, but was not engaged. On 15 December she was assigned to Force 2, the distant escort for Convoy JW 55A, with the battleship HMS Duke of York and four destroyers. Force 2 was commanded by Admiral Bruce Fraser, Commander-in-Chief of Home Fleet, in Duke of York. For the first time the British distant cover force escorted the convoy all the way to the Kola Inlet. Their passage was uneventful, and Force 2 sailed on 18 December to refuel at Iceland. Before he reached his destination, Admiral Fraser received Ultra information that a sortie by the German battleship Scharnhorst was likely to attack Convoy JW 55B, which was already at sea.

=== Battle of North Cape ===
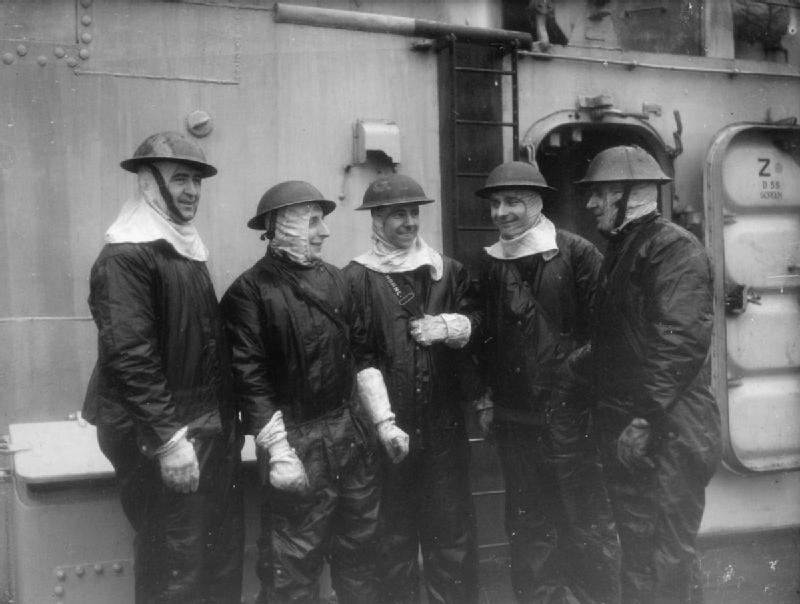
Jamaica's torpedomen who finally dispatched the Scharnhorst, at Scapa Flow after the sinking of the German warship on 26 December 1943

German aerial reconnaissance spotted the convoy on 22 December, and Scharnhorst, escorted by five destroyers of the 4th Destroyer Flotilla, sailed on 25 December to intercept it. The resulting engagement became known as the Battle of North Cape. The Germans were spotted on the morning of 26 December and were engaged by the covering force that consisted of the cruisers HMS Belfast, HMS Sheffield, HMS Norfolk and four destroyers. Meanwhile, HMS Jamaica and HMS Duke of York approached from the south west, barring the Scharnhorst's path of retreat. The German battleship turned for her base at Altafjord in the early afternoon after two brief encounters with the British cruisers. She was spotted by Duke of York's Type 273 radar at a range of 45,500 yards (41,600 m) and Duke of York opened fire half an hour later. Jamaica fired her first salvo a minute after, and hit Scharnhorst on her third broadside. She was forced to cease fire after 19 salvos as the German ship was faster in the heavy seas than the British ships and was opening up the range despite heavy damage from the British shells.

A shell from Duke of York's last volley penetrated into Scharnhorst's Number One boiler room and effectively destroyed it. This reduced the German ship's speed sufficiently for the British destroyers to catch up and make four torpedo hits using a pincer attack. This slowed the ship again, so that Jamaica and Duke of York also caught up and opened fire at a range of 10,400 yards (5.9 mi; 9.5 km). They hit the German ship continually, but she did not sink after 20 minutes of firing so Jamaica was ordered to torpedo her. Two torpedoes from her first volley of three missed and the third misfired, so the cruiser had to turn about to fire her other broadside of three, two of which appeared to hit. Belfast and the destroyers also fired torpedoes before Scharnhorst finally sank.

=== Further convoys and the raids on the Tirpitz ===
In February–March 1944, Jamaica served as part of the covering forces for Convoys JW 57, JW 58 and RA 58. She was detached from the latter to escort the aircraft carrier HMS Victorious as she launched an air strike against the German battleship Tirpitz as part of Operation Tungsten. In July she formed part of the covering force for the carriers HMS Formidable, HMS Furious and HMS Indefatigable during an unsuccessful attack on the German battleship Tirpitz berthed in Kaafjord (Operation Mascot). Jamaica escorted the Convoys JW 59 and RA 59 in August–September before starting a major refit in October that lasted until April 1945. The ship's 'X' turret (third from the front) was removed and her light anti-aircraft suite now consisted of five quadruple and four single 2-pounder mounts, four single mounts for 40 mm Bofors guns, two twin-gun Oerlikon mounts and six single Oerlikons while her radar suite was modernized. On 6 June the cruiser conveyed King George VI and the Queen on a visit of the Channel Islands. Jamaica was assigned to the 5th Cruiser Squadron of the East Indies Fleet in September and was later transferred to the 4th Cruiser Squadron. The ship was reassigned to the North America and West Indies Station in August 1948.

=== Korean War ===
Fighting between North and South Korea had broken out on 25 June 1950, whilst Jamaica was on passage to Japan. She, and her escort HMS Black Swan, were ordered to rendezvous with the American light cruiser USS Juneau off the east coast of Korea to bombard advancing North Korean troops. On 2 July a North Korean supply convoy was returning from Chumunjin when it was spotted by the Allied ships. The escorting motor torpedo boats and motor gun boats turned to fight, but three torpedo boats and both gun boats were sunk without inflicting any damage on the Allied ships. They resumed bombarding coastal targets. Six days later Jamaica was hit by a 75-millimetre (3 in) shell that killed six and wounded five. On 15 August the ship bombarded captured harbour facilities in Kunsan. The following month, Jamaica participated in the preparatory bombardment of the island of Wolmi-do before the main landing on 15 September. During the landing itself she supported the southern flank of the assault and she was tasked to support the 1st Marine Regiment afterwards. Two days after the landing Jamaica and the American heavy cruiser USS Rochester were attacked by a pair of Yakovlev piston-engined fighters at dawn. One aircraft succeeded in strafing the ship, killing one sailor, before it was shot down by the ship's guns.

=== Post-Korean War ===
The ship was the flagship of the Reserve Fleet from May 1953 to 1954 when she was recommissioned for service with the Mediterranean Fleet. Assigned to the 1st Cruiser Squadron, she was refitted in Chatham Dockyard from June 1955 and rejoined her squadron. From the end of 1955 until early 1956 she played the part of HMS Exeter in the film The Battle of the River Plate. The ship participated in Operation Musketeer in November 1956. The ship led the bombardment force covering the Royal Marine landings at Port Said, but she was not permitted to fire her main guns as the Cabinet had banned naval gunfire support by guns larger than 4.5 inches (114 mm). Jamaica was placed in reserve again in September 1958 after a port visit to Kiel. She was sold for scrap on 14 November 1960 and arrived at Arnott Young's yards at Dalmuir on 20 December 1960 to begin demolition.
