= Battle of the Barents Sea =

World War II naval battle

- Part of the Second World War
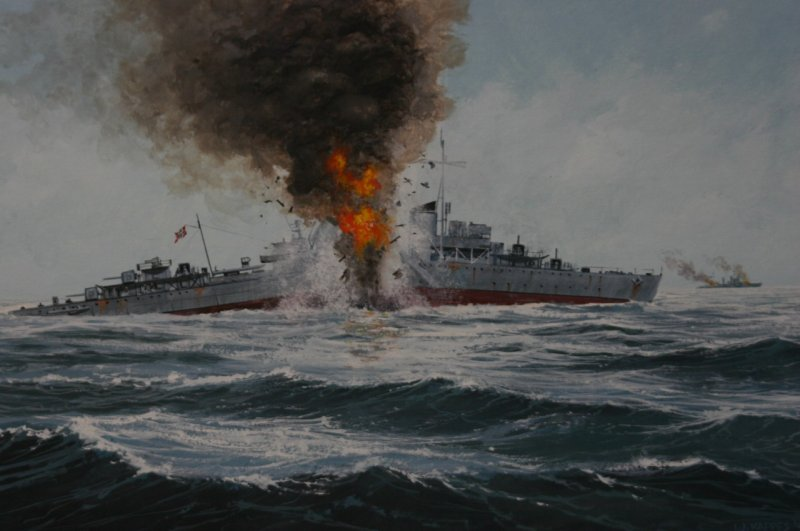
- Battle of the Barents Sea; Irwin J. Kappes, 2009
Date	31 December 1942
Location	Barents Sea, Arctic Ocean 73.25°N 29°E
Result	British victory

Belligerents
United Kingdom	Germany

Commanders and leaders
Robert Sherbrooke (WIA); Robert Burnett	Oskar Kummetz

Strength
2 light cruisers; 6 destroyers; 2 corvettes; 1 minesweeper; 2 trawlers	2 heavy cruisers; 6 destroyers

Casualties and losses
250 killed; 1 destroyer sunk; 1 minesweeper sunk; 1 destroyer damaged	330 killed; 1 destroyer sunk; 1 heavy cruiser damaged

The Battle of the Barents Sea was a World War II naval engagement on 31 December 1942 between warships of the German Navy (Kriegsmarine) and British ships escorting Convoy JW 51B to Kola Inlet in the USSR. The action took place in the Barents Sea north of North Cape, Norway. The German raiders' failure to inflict significant losses on the convoy infuriated Hitler, who ordered that German naval strategy would henceforth concentrate on the U-boat fleet rather than surface ships.

== Background ==
=== Convoy JW 51B ===
Convoy JW 51B comprised fourteen merchant ships carrying war materials to the USSR, about 202 tanks, 2,046 vehicles, 87 fighters, 33 bombers, 11,500 short tons (10,400 t) of fuel, 12,650 short tons (11,480 t) of aviation fuel and just over 54,000 short tons (49,000 t) of other supplies. They were protected by the destroyers HMS Achates, Obdurate, Obedient, Onslow, Oribi and Orwell, with the Flower-class corvettes HMS Rhododendron and Hyderabad, the minesweeper HMS Bramble and trawlers Vizalma and Northern Gem. The escort commander was Captain Robert Sherbrooke (in Onslow). The convoy sailed in the dead of winter to preclude attacks by German aircraft like those that had devastated Convoy PQ 17. Force R (Rear-Admiral Robert L. Burnett), with the cruisers HMS Sheffield and Jamaica and two destroyers, was independently stationed in the Barents Sea to provide distant cover.

=== Operation Regenbogen ===
On 31 December, a German force (Vice-Admiral Oskar Kummetz) based along Altafjord in northern Norway, began Unternehmen Regenbogen (Operation Rainbow). After Convoy PQ 18, the force had waited to attack the next Arctic convoy but their temporary suspension by the British during Operation Torch in the Mediterranean and Operation FB, the routing of single ships to Russia, had provided no opportunity to begin the operation. The force comprised the heavy cruisers Admiral Hipper and Lützow and the destroyers Friedrich Eckoldt, Richard Beitzen, Theodor Riedel, Z29, Z30 and Z31.

== Prelude ==
Convoy JW 51B sailed from Loch Ewe on 22 December 1942 and met its escort off Iceland on 25 December. From there, the ships sailed north-east, meeting severe gales on 28 and 29 December that caused ships of the convoy to lose station. When the weather moderated, five merchantmen and the escorts HMS Oribi and HMT Vizalma were missing and HMS Bramble was detached to search for them. Three of the stragglers rejoined the following day, and the other ships proceeded independently towards Kola Inlet. On 24 December, the convoy was sighted by German reconnaissance aircraft and from 30 December was shadowed by U-354 (Kapitänleutnant Karl-Heinz Herbschleb). When the report was received by the German Naval Staff, Kummetz was ordered to sail immediately to intercept the convoy. Kummetz split his force into two divisions, led by Admiral Hipper and Lützow, respectively.

== Battle ==
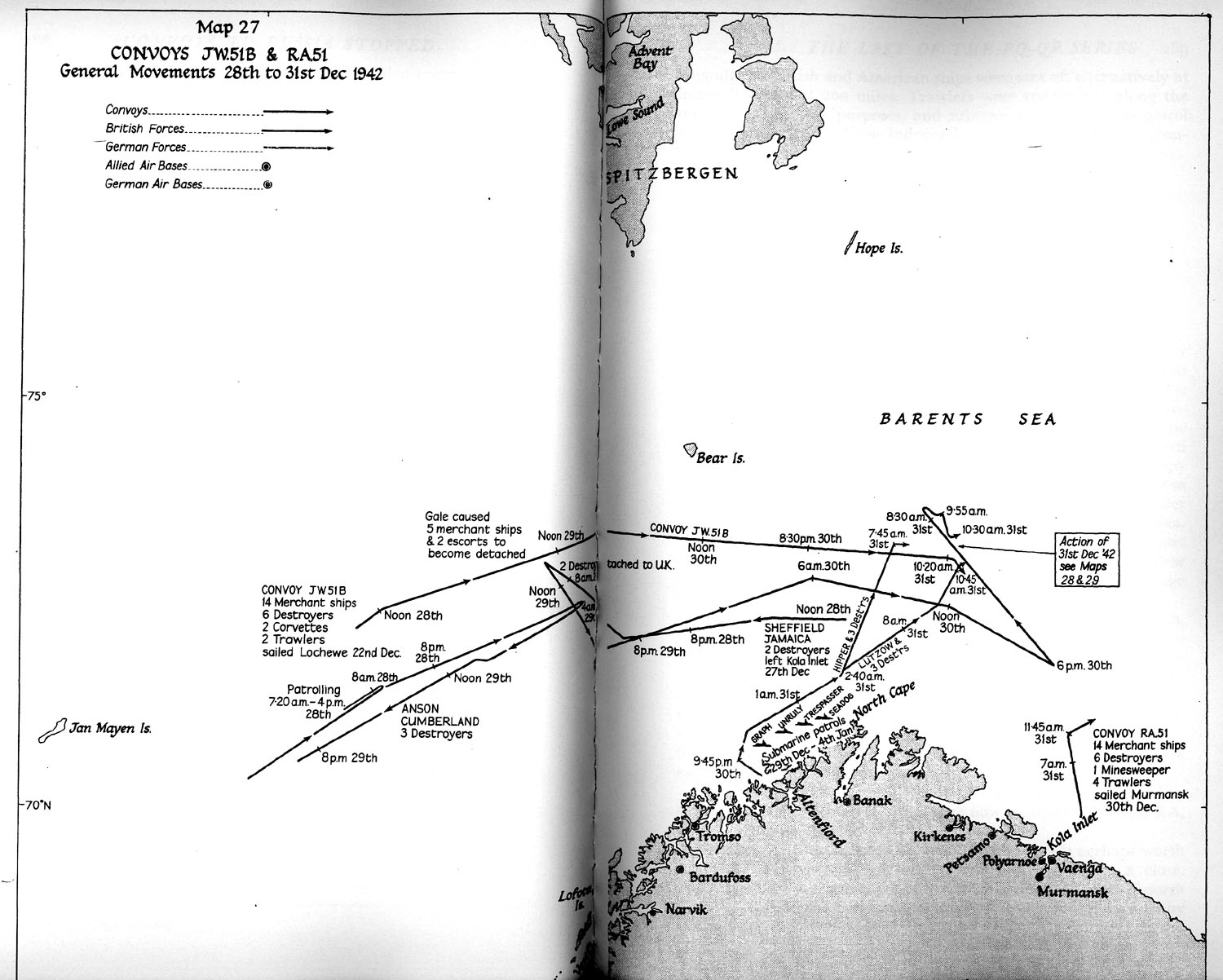
Battle of the Barents Sea

At 08:00 on 31 December, the main body of Convoy JW 51B, twelve ships and eight warships, was some 120 nmi (220 km; 140 mi) north of the coast of Finnmark heading east. Detached from the convoy were the destroyer Oribi and one ship, which took no part in the action; 15 nmi (28 km; 17 mi) astern (north-east) of the convoy, Bramble was searching for the stragglers. To the north of the convoy, about 45 nmi (83 km; 52 mi) off, was Vizalma and another ship, while Burnett's cruisers were 15 nmi (28 km; 17 mi) to the south-east, 30 nmi (56 km; 35 mi) from the convoy. To the east, 150 nmi (280 km; 170 mi) away, the home-bound Convoy RA 51 was heading west. To the north of the convoy, Admiral Hipper and three destroyers were closing, and 50 nmi (93 km; 58 mi) away, Lützow and her three destroyers were closing from the south. At 08:00, the destroyer Friedrich Eckholdt sighted the convoy and reported it to Admiral Hipper.

At 08:20 on 31 December, HMS Obdurate, south of the convoy, spotted three German destroyers to the rear (west) of the convoy. Then, HMS Onslow spotted Admiral Hipper, also to the rear of the convoy and steered to intercept with HMS Orwell, HMS Obedient and Obdurate. HMS Achates was ordered to stay with the convoy and make smoke. After an exchange of fire, the British ships turned, apparently to make a torpedo attack. Considerably outgunned, Sherbrooke knew that his torpedoes were his most formidable weapons; the attack was a feint as once the torpedoes had been launched, their threat would be gone. The ruse worked. Admiral Hipper retired, since Kummetz had been ordered not to risk his ships. Admiral Hipper returned to make a second attack, hitting Onslow and causing severe damage and many casualties, including 17 killed. Onslow survived the damage but Sherbrooke had been badly injured by a large steel splinter and command passed to the captain of Obedient.

Admiral Hipper sailed north of the convoy and stumbled across Bramble, a Halcyon-class minesweeper. Admiral Hipper returned fire with her much heavier guns, causing a large explosion on Bramble. The destroyer Friedrich Eckholdt was ordered to finish it off, and Bramble sank with all hands, while Admiral Hipper shifted aim to Obedient and Achates to the south. Achates was badly damaged but continued to make smoke until she sank, the trawler Northern Gem rescuing many of the crew. The Germans reported sinking a destroyer but this was a mistaken identification of Bramble; they had not realised Achates had been hit.

The shellfire attracted the attention of Force R, which was still further north. Sheffield and Jamaica approached unseen and opened fire on Admiral Hipper at 11:35, hitting her with enough six-inch shells to damage (and cause minor flooding to) two of her boiler rooms, reducing her speed to 28 kn (52 km/h; 32 mph). Kummetz initially thought that the attack of the two cruisers was coming from another destroyer but upon realising his mistake, he ordered his ships to retreat to the west. Friedrich Eckholdt and Richard Beitzen mistook Sheffield for Admiral Hipper and attempted to formate with the British ships. Sheffield opened fire; Friedrich Eckholdt broke in two and sank with all hands.

Lützow approached from the east and fired ineffectively at the convoy, still hidden by the smoke laid by Achates. Heading north-west to join Admiral Hipper, Lützow also encountered Sheffield and Jamaica, which opened fire. Coincidentally, both sides decided to break off the action at the same time, each fearing imminent torpedo attacks by destroyers upon their cruisers. This was shortly after noon; Burnett with Force R shadowed the German ships at a distance until it was evident that they were retiring to their base. The ships of the convoy re-formed and continued towards Kola Inlet.

== Aftermath ==
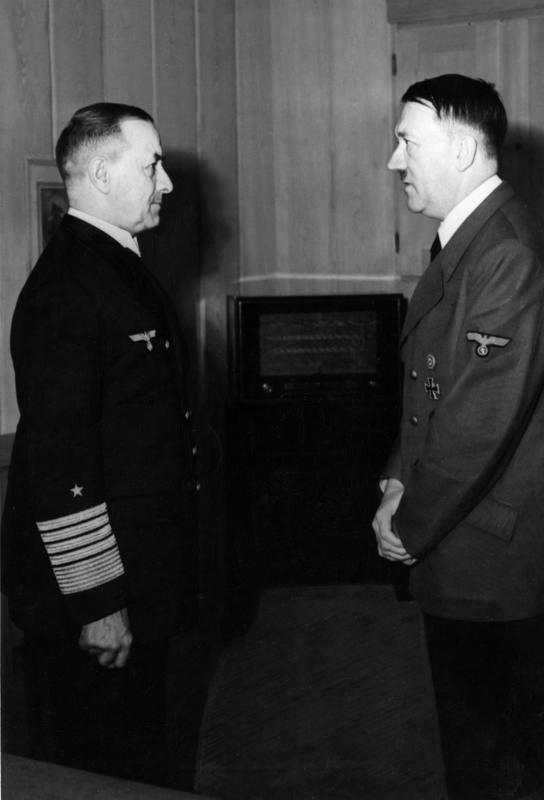
Erich Raeder with Adolf Hitler shortly after he resigned from his post of commander in chief of the Navy in 1943

The encounter took place in the middle of the months-long polar night, and the German and British forces were scattered and unsure of the positions of the rest of their forces or those of their opponent. The battle became a confused affair and at times it was not clear who was firing on whom or how many ships were engaged. Despite the German efforts, all fourteen of the merchant ships reached their destinations in the USSR undamaged.

Hitler was infuriated at what he regarded as the uselessness of the surface raiders, seeing that the initial attack of the two heavy cruisers was held back by destroyers before the arrival of the two British light cruisers. This failure nearly made Hitler enforce a decision to scrap the surface fleet and order the German Navy to concentrate on U-boat warfare. Admiral Erich Raeder, commander in chief of the Kriegsmarine, offered his resignation, which Hitler accepted. Raeder was replaced by Admiral Karl Dönitz, the commander of the U-boat fleet.

Dönitz saved the German surface fleet, although Admiral Hipper and the light cruisers Emden and Leipzig were laid up until late 1944; repairs and rebuilding of the battleship Gneisenau were abandoned. Work to complete the aircraft carrier Graf Zeppelin, was suspended for the second and final time. German E-boats continued to operate off the coast of France but only one big surface operation was executed after the battle, the attempted raid on Convoy JW 55B by the battleship Scharnhorst. The battleship was sunk by a British force in what became known as the Battle of the North Cape.

== Victoria Cross ==
Captain Robert Sherbrooke was awarded the Victoria Cross. He acknowledged that it had really been awarded in honour of the whole crew of Onslow. In the action he had been badly wounded and he lost the sight in his left eye. He returned to operations and retired from the navy in the 1950s with the rank of rear-admiral.

== Commemoration ==
At the memorial for Bramble, Captain Harvey Crombie said of the crew

They had braved difficulties and perils probably unparalleled in the annals of the British Navy, and calls upon their courage and endurance were constant, but they never failed. They would not have us think sadly at this time, but rather that we should praise God that they had remained steadfast to duty to the end.

The battle was the subject of the book 73 North by Dudley Pope and the poem JW51B: A Convoy by Alan Ross, who served on Onslow.

== Order of battle ==
- Damaged
- Sunk

=== Royal Navy ===
British ships
Ship	Type	Notes
Close convoy escort
HMS Hyderabad	Flower-class corvette	22 December – 3 January
HMS Rhododendron	Flower-class corvette	22 December – 3 January
HMS Bramble	Halcyon-class minesweeper	22–29 December
HMT Vizalma	ASW trawler	22 December – 3 January
HMT Northern Gem	ASW trawler	22 December – 3 January
Fighting destroyer escort
HMS Achates	A-class destroyer	25 – 31 December
HMS Obdurate	O-class destroyer	25 December – 3 January
HMS Obedient	O-class destroyer	25 December – 3 January
HMS Onslow	O-class destroyer	25 December – 3 January
HMS Oribi	O-class destroyer	25–31 December, separated, sailed independently
HMS Orwell	O-class destroyer	25 December – 3 January
Force R (cruiser covering force)
HMS Jamaica	Fiji-class cruiser	27–31 December, from Kola Inlet
HMS Sheffield	Town-class cruiser	27–31 December, from Kola Inlet
HMS Matchless	M-class destroyer	27–29 December, from Kola Inlet
HMS Opportune	O-class destroyer	27–29 December, from Kola Inlet

=== Kriegsmarine ===
Regenbogen ships
Ship	Type	Notes
Admiral Hipper	Admiral Hipper-class cruiser	Sailed 30 December
Lützow	Deutschland-class cruiser	Sailed 30 December
Z4 Richard Beitzen	Type 1934-class destroyer	Sailed 30 December
Z6 Theodor Riedel	Type 1934A-class destroyer	Sailed 30 December
Z16 Friedrich Eckoldt	Type 1934A-class destroyer	Sailed 30 December
Z29	Type 1936A-class destroyer	Sailed 30 December
Z30	Type 1936A-class destroyer	Sailed 30 December
Z31	Type 1936A-class destroyer	Sailed 30 December

== Bibliography ==
- Boog, H.; Rahn, W.; Stumpf, R.; Wegner, B. (2001) [1990]. Der globale Krieg: Die Ausweitung zum Weltkrieg und der Wechsel zur Initiative 1941 bis 1943 [Widening of the Conflict into a World War and the Shift of the Initiative 1941–1943]. Das Deutsche Reich und der Zweite Weltkrieg (Germany and the Second World War). Vol. VI. Translated by Osers, Ewald; Brownjohn, John; Crampton, Patricia; Willmot, Louise (eng. trans. Cambridge University Press, London ed.). Stuttgart: Deutsche Verlags-Anstalt for the Militärgeschichtlichen Forschungsamt. ISBN 0-19-822888-0.
  - Rahn, W. "PART III The War at Sea in the Atlantic and in the Arctic Ocean IV. Operations on the Northern Flank of Europe". In Boog et al. (2001).
- "HMS Bramble 1942". halcyon-class.co.uk. 7 November 2010.
- Kemp, Paul (1993). Convoy! Drama in Arctic Waters. London: Arms and Armour. ISBN 978-1-85409-130-7.
- Pope, Dudley (1988) [1958]. 73 North: The Battle of the Barents Sea (repr. Secker and Warburg ed.). London: Weidenfeld & Nicolson. ISBN 978-0-43-637752-5 – via Archive Foundation.
- Rohwer, Jürgen; Hümmelchen, Gerhard (2005) [1972]. Chronology of the War at Sea, 1939–1945: The Naval History of World War Two (3rd rev. ed.). London: Chatham. ISBN 978-1-86176-257-3.
- Roskill, S. W. (1962) [1956]. The Period of Balance. History of the Second World War: The War at Sea 1939–1945. Vol. II (3rd impr. ed.). London: HMSO. OCLC 174453986.
- Roskill, S. W. (1960). The War at Sea 1939–1945: The Offensive 1st June 1943 – 31st May 1944. History of the Second World War United Kingdom Military Series. Vol. III. Part I (1st ed.). London: HMSO. OCLC 277168049.
- Ross, Alan (1967). "JW 51B: A Convoy (1946)". Poems, 1942–67. London: Eyre & Spottiswoode. OCLC 458952.
- Ruegg, R.; Hague, A. (1993) [1992]. Convoys to Russia: Allied Convoys and Naval Surface Operations in Arctic Waters 1941–1945 (2nd rev. enl. ed.). Kendal: World Ship Society. ISBN 0-905617-66-5.
- Woodman, Richard (2004) [1994]. Arctic Convoys 1941–1945. London: John Murray. ISBN 978-0-7195-5752-1.
