= HMS Achates (H12) =

A-class destroyer

Coordinates: 73°18′N 30°6′E

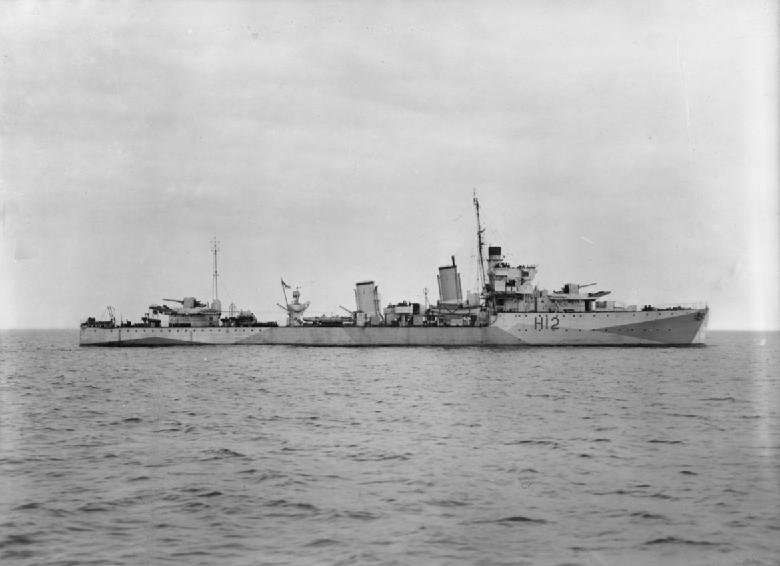
- Achates after having 'A' gun replaced by a Hedgehog anti-submarine mortar

History

United Kingdom
- Name: Achates
- Ordered: 6 March 1928
- Builder: John Brown & Company, Clydebank
- Yard number: 526
- Laid down: 11 September 1928
- Launched: 4 October 1929
- Commissioned: 27 March 1930
- Motto: Fidus Achates (Latin: "Faithful Achates")
- Fate: Sunk, Battle of the Barents Sea, 31 December 1942

General characteristics (as built)
- Class & type: A-class destroyer
- Displacement: 1,350 long tons (1,370 t) (standard); 1,773 long tons (1,801 t) (deep load)
- Length: 323 ft (98 m) (o/a)
- Beam: 32 ft 3 in (9.83 m)
- Draught: 12 ft 3 in (3.73 m)
- Installed power: 34,000 shp (25,000 kW); 3 × Admiralty 3-drum boilers
- Propulsion: 2 × shafts; 2 × geared steam turbines
- Speed: 35 knots (65 km/h; 40 mph)
- Range: 4,800 nmi (8,900 km; 5,500 mi) at 15 knots (28 km/h; 17 mph)
- Complement: 134; 140 (1940)
- Armament: 4 × single 4.7 in (120 mm) guns; 2 × single 2-pdr (40 mm) AA guns; 2 × quadruple 21 in (533 mm) torpedo tubes; 6 × depth charges, 3 chutes

HMS Achates was an A-class destroyer built for the Royal Navy during the late 1920s. Completed in 1930, she initially served with the Mediterranean Fleet. She was sunk on 31 December 1942 during the Battle of the Barents Sea.

== Design and description ==
In the mid-1920s, the Royal Navy ordered two destroyers from two different builders, Ambuscade, built by Yarrow, and Amazon, built by Thornycroft, incorporating the lessons learned from World War I, as prototypes for future classes. The A-class destroyers were based on Amazon, slightly enlarged and carrying two more torpedo tubes. They displaced 1,350 long tons (1,370 t) at standard load and 1,773 long tons (1,801 t) at deep load. The ships had an overall length of 323 feet (98.5 m), a beam of 32 feet 3 inches (9.83 m) and a draught of 12 feet 3 inches (3.73 m). Acasta was powered by a pair of Brown-Curtis geared steam turbines, each driving one shaft, using steam provided by three Admiralty 3-drum boilers. The turbines developed a total of 34,000 shaft horsepower (25,000 kW) and gave a speed of 35 knots (65 km/h; 40 mph). During her sea trials, she reached a maximum speed of 35.5 knots (65.7 km/h; 40.9 mph) from 34,596 shp (25,798 kW). The ships carried enough fuel oil to give them a range of 4,800 nautical miles (8,900 km; 5,500 mi) at 15 knots (28 km/h; 17 mph). The complement of the A-class ships was 134 officers and ratings and increased to 143 by 1940.

Their main armament consisted of four QF 4.7-inch (120 mm) Mk IX guns in single mounts, in two superfiring pairs in front of the bridge and aft of the superstructure. For anti-aircraft (AA) defence, they had two 40-millimetre (1.6 in) QF 2-pounder Mk II AA guns mounted on a platform between their funnels. The ships were fitted with two above-water quadruple mounts for 21-inch (533 mm) torpedoes. Carrying the minesweeping paravanes on the quarterdeck limited depth charge chutes to three with two depth charges provided for each chute. The A-class destroyers were given space for an ASDIC system, but it was not initially fitted.

=== Modifications ===
As a result of experience from the Norwegian campaign, the Royal Navy launched a programme of modifying its destroyers by adding high-angle anti-aircraft guns, with the A-class replacing the aft set of torpedo tubes with a single 12 pounder (3-inch (76mm)) gun, with all of the A-class modified by October 1940, although the lack of any fire control equipment meant that the gun was of limited use. Early in the Second World War, a depth charge outfit of 35 charges was carried, but this had increased to 42 charges, which could be dropped in a five-charge pattern, by April 1941. In late 1941, Y gun (the furthest aft 4.7-inch weapon) was removed to accommodate a heavier depth charge armament, with additional depth charge throwers and rails fitted to allow a ten-charge depth charge pattern to be dropped, with 60 depth charges carried, while A gun (the furthest forward 4.7-inch gun) was replaced by a Hedgehog anti-submarine weapon.

== Ship history ==
Achates was ordered on 6 March 1928, and was laid down on 11 September 1928 at John Brown & Company's Clydebank shipyard, launched on 4 October 1929 and completed on 27 March 1930. Following commissioning, Achates joined the 3rd Destroyer Flotilla, part of the Mediterranean Fleet. In early 1931, Achates accompanied the aircraft carrier Eagle on a visit to Buenos Aires, Argentina to support a British Empire Trade Exhibition, also visiting Montevideo and Rio de Janeiro. In October 1931, rioting in Cyprus led to the Royal Navy sending warships to the British protectorate, with Achates, sister ship Acasta and the cruisers London and Shropshire ordered to Cyprus from Crete on 22 October. On 4 April 1932, Achates and the destroyer Active collided off Saint-Tropez, with Active requiring repair at Malta. The ships of the 3rd Flotilla were refitted in British dockyards in the summer of 1932, with Achetes completing her refit at Devonport in October 1932, before returning to the Mediterranean, leaving for Gibraltar on 4 November 1932. The flotilla, including Achates again left the Mediterranean for home ports on 22 April 1935, with Achates recommissioning with a new crew at Devonport on 23 July before returning to the Mediterranean later that month, with the flotilla expected to work up and train at Gibraltar for a month before transferring to Malta.

On 13 January 1937, Achates collected the crew of the Spanish steamer Aragon, which had been seized by the German cruiser Admiral Graf Spee in retaliation against Spanish Republican actions against the German ship Palos, and repatriated Aragon's crew to Málaga. Achates, with the rest of the A-class, which was replaced in the 3rd Flotilla by the ships of the I-class, returned to Britain in March 1937 and was paid off at Devonport. In October 1937, Achates replaced the destroyer Woolston as parent ship of the 1st Anti-Submarine Flotilla based at Portland. In July 1938, Achates was relieved by Woolston as parent ship of the 1st Anti-Submarine Flotilla, and relieved Wolverine as emergency destroyer at Devonport. By May 1939, Achates was attached to the 6th Submarine Flotilla, based at Portland.

=== Second World War ===
At the start of the Second World War in September 1939, Achates joined the 18th Destroyer Flotilla of Portsmouth Command, carrying out anti-submarine patrols and convoy escort duties in the English Channel. In July 1940, Achates joined the 16th Destroyer Flotilla, based at Harwich, operating on patrol and escort duties in the North Sea. On 2 August 1940, the Home Fleet reorganised its destroyer flotillas, with Achates joining the 12th Destroyer Flotilla. In November 1940, Achates joined the 4th Escort Group. On 2 November 1940, the German submarine U-31 attempted an attack on the destroyer Antelope, part of the escort for Convoy OB 237, but Antelope detected the submarine and attacked with depth charges, while sending out an alert which brought up Achates. Achates's sonar was out of service, however, but continued depth charge attacks from Antelope badly damaged U-31, which surfaced and scuttled herself. Achates was still a member of the 4th Escort Group on 30 December 1940. She joined the 3rd Destroyer Flotilla, part of the Home Fleet, during 1941. (Note: Whitley says that the A-class rejoined the 3rd Flotilla in "early 1941". while Kindell records Achates carrying out convoy escort duties in early April while she was working with fleet units from mid April.)

==== Battle of the Denmark Strait ====
On 22 May, just after midnight, Achates sailed along with the destroyers Electra, Antelope, Anthony, Echo, and Icarus, escorting the battlecruiser Hood and the battleship Prince of Wales to cover the northern approaches against a breakout into the Atlantic by the German battleship Bismarck and the cruiser Prinz Eugen. The intention was that the force would watch the Denmark Strait, providing support for the cruisers Norfolk and Suffolk.

On the evening of 23 May, weather started getting bad, with the destroyers struggling to keep pace with Hood and Prince of Wales. At 0203 on the morning of 24 May, the destroyers were ordered to continue to search to the North while the two capital ships turned to the south. At about 0535, the German forces were sighted by Hood, and shortly after, the Germans sighted the British ships. Firing commenced at 0552. At about 0600, Hood suffered a massive explosion, sinking the ship within three or four minutes.

Following the loss of Hood, Admiral Wake-Walker, aboard Norfolk, ordered the destroyers to search for survivors, with the two cruisers continuing to shadow the German ships. The first destroyer, Electra arrived about two hours after Hood went under. They were expecting to find many survivors, and rigged scrambling nets and heaving lines, and placed life belts on the deck where they could be quickly thrown in, but only three survivors were found. Electra rescued these survivors, and continued searching. No more were found, only driftwood, debris, and a desk drawer filled with documents. After several hours searching, they left the area.

==== Kirkenes to Torch ====
On 23 July 1941, while the task force to take part in a carrier raid on Kirkenes and Petsamo was assembling off Iceland, Achates struck a British mine and was severely damaged, blowing off the destroyer's bow, including "A" gun, and killing 63 of her crew and injuring 25 more. Achates was towed to Seyðisfjörður by Anthony and after temporary repairs, left Iceland under the tow of the tug Assurance on 7 August, but a storm on 10 August caused further damage, with longitudinal members fracturing and cracking of upper deck plating, and the ships had to put into Skaglefjord in the Faroe Islands, where further temporary repairs were made. Achates eventually reached the Tyne on 24 August 1941.

Achates remained under repair for eight months before recommissioning. On 23 May 1942, Achates joined Arctic convoy PQ 16, remaining with the convoy until 30 May, when the convoy had reached Russian waters with the loss of seven out of 36 merchant ships. Achates returned to British waters as part of the westbound convoy QP 13, which left Arkhangelsk on 26 June. Achates remained with the convoy until 7 July 1942. In September 1942, Achates formed part of the Ocean Escort for Arctic Convoy PQ 18, joining on 7 September and remaining with it until the convoy reached Arkhangelsk on 21 September. In total, 13 merchant ships were sunk by German submarines and air attacks, with the convoy's escort sinking three submarines.

In November 1942, Achates took part in Operation Torch, the Anglo-American invasion of French North Africa. She formed part of an assault convoy, and was then detached to escort aircraft carriers during the landings at Oran, Algeria. On 8 November 1942, while deployed off Oran, Achates detected, and attacked a Vichy French submarine, which had sortied to contest the Allied landings in the area. Achates' attack saw the rise of oil to the surface of the sea and huge air bubbles, as well as debris from both inside, and outside the submarine. Two submarines were sunk by Achates and the destroyer Westcott off Oran that day, Argonaute and Actéon. (Note: Sources differ as to which destroyer sank which submarine. Blair says that Achates sank Actéon and Westcott sank Argonaute, while U-boat.net says that Argonaute was sunk by both destroyers, with Westcott sinking Actéon.)

==== Battle of the Barents Sea ====
On 25 December 1942, Achates joined the escort of Convoy JW 51B en route from Loch Ewe to Murmansk. On 31 December 1942, the convoy was attacked by the German heavy cruisers Admiral Hipper and Lützow together with six large destroyers in the Battle of the Barents Sea. The German plan was to divide the attacking force, with Hipper and three destroyers attacking the convoy from the northwest, drawing the escort off, so that Lützow could attack the convoy unhindered from the south.

When the German attack began at about 9:15 hr, Achates, following standing orders, positioned herself to lay smoke screens to obscure the convoy from attacking forces while the more modern destroyers of the escort would intercept the enemy force. Achates was damaged by a near-miss from Hipper early in the action, with shell splinters causing flooding, but the destroyer continued to lay smoke. At 11:15 hr Achates was ordered to join the badly damaged Onslow, but as she pulled clear of her own smoke screen, was spotted by Hipper and badly hit, killing 40 men, including Achates' commanding officer, Lieutenant-Commander A. H. T. Johns, and causing increased flooding. Command was assumed by the destroyer's second in command, Lieutenant Loftus Peyon-Jones. Despite the damage, Achates continued to lay smoke to protect the convoy, while flooding and the resultant list gradually increased. At about 13:00 hr, power was lost, and Achates signalled the trawler Northern Gem to come to her assistance. However, at 13:30 hr, as Northern Gem approached, Achates suddenly capsized. Northern Gem rescued 81 of Achates' crew, one of whom later died on the trawler. A total of 113 of Achates' crew were killed.

Despite being heavily outgunned the escort, under the command of Captain R. St. Vincent Sherbrooke, VC, held off the attacks until the covering cruisers Sheffield and Jamaica came to the escort's aid. Sheffield damaged Hipper and sank the German destroyer Z16 Friedrich Eckoldt, causing the Germans to break off the attack. No merchant ships were sunk. Peyton-Jones was awarded the Distinguished Service Order for his role in the battle, with other awards to Achates crew including a Conspicuous Gallantry Medal, a Distinguished Service Cross and seven Distinguished Service Medals. Sixteen men were Mentioned in dispatches, eleven, including Johns, posthumously.

== Bibliography ==
- Barnett, Correlli (2000). Engage the Enemy More Closely. Classic Penguin. ISBN 0-141-39008-5.
- Blair, Clay (2000). Hitler's U-Boat War: The Hunters 1939–1942. London: Cassell & Co. ISBN 0-304-35260-8.
- Blair, Clay (2000). Hitler's U-Boat War: The Hunted, 1942–1945. New York: Modern Library. ISBN 0-679-64033-9.
- Colledge, J. J.; Warlow, Ben (2006) [1969]. Ships of the Royal Navy: The Complete Record of All Fighting Ships of the Royal Navy from the 15th Century to the Present (3rd Rev ed.). London: Chatham Publishing. ISBN 978-1-86176-281-8. OCLC 67375475.
- English, John (1993). Amazon to Ivanhoe: British Standard Destroyers of the 1930s. Kendal, England: World Ship Society. ISBN 0-905617-64-9.
- Friedman, Norman (2009). British Destroyers From Earliest Days to the Second World War. Annapolis, Maryland: Naval Institute Press. ISBN 978-1-59114-081-8.
- Halpern, Paul G., ed. (2016). The Mediterranean Fleet, 1930–1939. Publications of the Navy Records Society. Vol. 163. London and New York: Routledge. ISBN 978-1-315-55560-7.
- Hodges, Peter; Friedman, Norman (1979). Destroyer Weapons of World War 2. Greenwich: Conway Maritime Press. ISBN 978-0-85177-137-3.
- Kemp, Paul (1999). The Admiralty Regrets: British Warship Losses of the 20th Century. Stroud, UK: Sutton Publishing Limited. ISBN 0-7509-1567-6.
- Kennedy, Ludovic (1984). Pursuit: The Chase and Sinking of the Bismarck. Bantam Books. ISBN 0-553-23795-0.
- Kostam, Angus (2019). Hunt The Bismarck: The pursuit of Germany's most famous battleship. Oxford: Osprey Publishing. ISBN 978-1-47283384-6.
- Lenton, H. T. (1998). British & Empire Warships of the Second World War. Annapolis, Maryland: Naval Institute Press. ISBN 1-55750-048-7.
- March, Edgar J. (1966). British Destroyers: A History of Development, 1892–1953; Drawn by Admiralty Permission From Official Records & Returns, Ships' Covers & Building Plans. London: Seeley Service. OCLC 164893555.
- Pope, Dudley (1988). 73 North: The Battle of the Barents Sea. London: The Alison Press. ISBN 0-436-37752-7.
- Rohwer, Jürgen; Hümmelchen, Gerhard (1992). Chronology of the War at Sea 1939–1945. London: Greenhill Books. ISBN 1-85367-117-7.
- Rohwer, Jürgen (2005). Chronology of the War at Sea 1939–1945: The Naval History of World War Two (Third Revised ed.). Annapolis, Maryland: Naval Institute Press. ISBN 1-59114-119-2.
- Roskill, S. W. (1956). The War at Sea 1939–1945: Volume II: The Period of Balance. History of the Second World War: United Kingdom Military Series. Her Majesty's Stationery Office.
- Ruegg, Bob; Hague, Arnold (1993). Convoys to Russia: 1941–1945. Kendal, UK: World Ship Society. ISBN 0-905617-66-5.
- Winser, John de S. British Invasion Fleets: The Mediterranean and Beyond 1942–1945. Gravesend, UK: World Ship Society. ISBN 0-9543310-0-1.
- Whitley, M. J. (1988). Destroyers of World War Two: An International Encyclopedia. Annapolis, Maryland: Naval Institute Press. ISBN 0-87021-326-1.
