= HMT Vizalma =

Anti-submarine warfare naval trawler

History

United Kingdom
- Name: HMT Vizalma
- Builder: Cook, Welton & Gemmell, Beverley
- Launched: 11 April 1940
- Requisitioned: 15 June 1940
- Completed: 12 August 1940
- Decommissioned: 23 December 1945
- Fate: Returned to original owners and eventually scrapped from 4 November 1964

General characteristics
- Displacement: 608 tons
- Length: 178.1 ft (54.3 m) LPP; 190 ft (58 m) LOA
- Beam: 30.8 ft 8 in (9.59 m)
- Propulsion: Triple expansion steam reciprocating engines by C. D. Holmes, 165 NHP
- Speed: 12 knots (22 km/h; 14 mph)
- Complement: 5 officers and 55 crew

HMT Vizalma was an anti-submarine warfare naval trawler of the Royal Navy during the Second World War. She spent the war escorting convoys in the Atlantic and Arctic, including the famous convoy JW 51B.

== Service history ==
Vizalma was ordered from Cook, Welton & Gemmell of Beverley by the Atlas Steam Fishing Company of Grimsby and launched on 11 April 1940. However, before she was completed, on 15 June 1940, she was requisitioned by the Admiralty and completed as an anti-submarine trawler on 12 August 1940. She was assigned to the Royal Naval Patrol Service and employed as a convoy escort.

Initially Vizalma was assigned to the Londonderry Escort Groups based in Derry, Northern Ireland, providing local escorts for Atlantic convoys entering and leaving the Western Approaches interspersed with trips to Gibraltar and Iceland. She was later transferred to the Iceland Command for duties on the Russian convoys escorting merchant ships from Scotland to the Kola Inlet via Iceland. She made two return trips to Murmansk.

The second outgoing convoy, in December 1942, was JW 51B, which was involved in the engagement that became known as the Battle of the Barents Sea. However, Vizalma had become separated from the convoy during a gale and was escorting merchantman Chester Valley away from the main group when the battle erupted. They went north to avoid the action and rejoined the convoy two days later. However, not directly involved in the battle she played a role in it : when the covering cruiser force of the convoy was racing towards the convoy in response to reports of an attacking German force, the force detected the 2 ships Vizalma and Chester Valley on their radar. They had to investigate and lost precious time whilst the German force was attacking the convoy escorts.

After returning from Russia, Vizalma resumed Atlantic convoy escort duties and, from September to November 1943, guard ship duties in the Faroes and Azores. On 23 December 1945 she was sold back to her original owners and converted into a deep-sea trawler. She was scrapped at Dunston from 4 November 1964.

== Convoys escorted by Vizalma ==
Convoy	From	To	Notes
OA 206	Methil	Dispersed	29 August − 3 September 1940
WN 19	Clyde	Methil	29 September – 3 October 1940
OB 232	Liverpool	Dispersed at 56°30′N 26°50′W	21–26 October 1940
SC 8	Sydney, Cape Breton	Liverpool	26–31 October 1940
OB 245	Liverpool	Dispersed at 56°35′N 17°38′W	18–22 November 1940
HX 85/1	Sydney, Cape Breton	Liverpool	22 November 1940
OB 256	Liverpool	Dispersed at 59°04′N 15°30′W	8–12 December 1940
OB 269	Liverpool	Dispersed	4–6 January 1941
OB 283	Liverpool	Dispersed	8–12 February 1941
HX 106	Halifax	Liverpool	15–18 February 1941
HG 54	Gibraltar	Liverpool	20 February – 12 March 1941
HG 57	Gibraltar	Liverpool	6–9 April 1941
OB 314	Liverpool	Dispersed at 61°05′N 35°25′W	24–28 April 1941
HX 121	Halifax	Liverpool	28–30 April 1941
OB 319	Liverpool	Dispersed at 61°N 35°W	9–13 May 1941
SC 30	Halifax	Liverpool	12–20 May 1941
HX 124	Halifax	Liverpool	14 May 1941
SL 75	Freetown	Liverpool	12–13 June 1941
N|8	Liverpool	Dispersed at 56°09′N 44°32′W	18–21 August 1941
N|13	Liverpool	Dispersed at 53°32′N 26°16′W	6–8 September 1941
N|18	Liverpool	Dispersed at 45°25′N 50°25′W	21–24 September 1941
SC 45	Sydney, Cape Breton	Liverpool	1 October 1941
N|25	Liverpool	Dispersed	11–13 October 1941
N|32	Liverpool	Halifax	3–6 November 1941
N|39	Liverpool	Dispersed at 53°34′N 39°30′W	22–29 November 1941
UR 7	Loch Ewe	Reykjavík	12–17 January 1942
UR 14	Loch Ewe	Reykjavík	28 February – 4 March 1942
RU 14	Reykjavík	Loch Ewe	7–11 March 1942
PQ 15	Oban	Murmansk	26 April – 5 May 1942
QP 12	Kola Inlet	Reykjavík	21–29 May 1942
JW 51B	Loch Ewe	Kola Inlet	22 December 1942 – 3 January 1943
RA 52	Kola Inlet	Loch Ewe	29 January – 8 February 1943
ONS 4	Liverpool	Halifax	—
ONS 9	Liverpool	Halifax	29 May – 7 June 1943
SC 134	Halifax	Liverpool	20 June – 1 July 1943
OS 64/KMS 38	Liverpool	Convoy Split	3–9 January 1944
RU 107	Reykjavík	Loch Ewe	3–7 February 1944
RU 109	Reykjavík	Loch Ewe	21–24 February 1944
RU 112	Reykjavík	Loch Ewe	18–21 March 1944
OS 73/KMS 47	Liverpool	Convoy Split	4–16 April 1944
KMS 47G	Liverpool	Gibraltar	16–17 April 1944
MKS 46G	Gibraltar	Liverpool	22–23 April 1944
SL 155/MKS 46	Freetown/Port Said	Liverpool	23 April – 3 May 1944
HX 304	New York	Liverpool	23 August – 1 September 1944
RU 127	Reykjavík	Loch Ewe	17–18 July 1944

== Notes and references ==
=== Sources ===
- Bertke, Donald A; Smith, Gordon; Kindell, Don (2012). World War II Sea War: The Royal Navy is Bloodied in the Mediterranean. Vol. 3. Dayton, Ohio: Bertke Publications. ISBN 9781937470012.
- Bertke, Donald A; Smith, Gordon; Kindell, Don (2012). World War II Sea War: Germany Sends Russia to the Allies. Vol. 4. Dayton, Ohio: Bertke Publications. ISBN 9781937470036.
- Bertke, Donald A; Smith, Gordon; Kindell, Don (2014). World War II Sea War: The Allies Halt the Axis Advance. Vol. 6. Dayton, Ohio: Bertke Publications. ISBN 9781937470098.
- Bertke, Donald A; Smith, Gordon; Kindell, Don (2015). World War II Sea War: Guadalcanal Secured. Vol. 8. Dayton, Ohio: Bertke Publications. ISBN 9781937470135.
- "Convoy Web".
- Kemp, Paul (1993). Convoy!. Casell. ISBN 0-304-35451-1.
- Lawson, Siri. "Ships in Atlantic Convoys". Warsailors.com.
- Lawson, Siri. "Ships in Arctic Convoys". Warsailors.com.
- Smith, Gordon. "Naval-History.net".
