= HMS Jamaica =

Six vessels of the Royal Navy have been named HMS Jamaica, after the island colony of Jamaica:

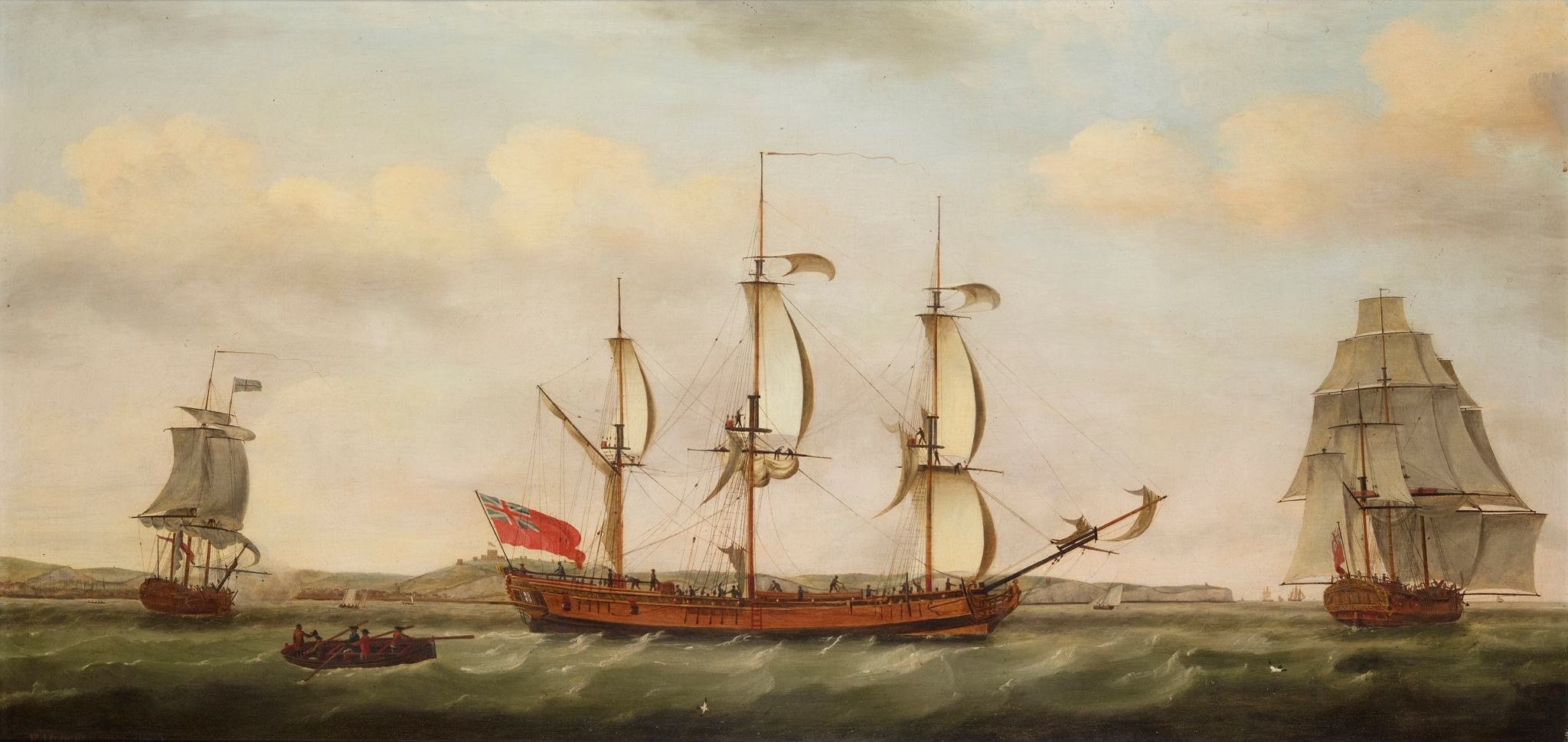
The galley frigate Jamaica off Dover by Francis Holman, 1780

- HMS Jamaica (1710), a 14-gun sloop launched in 1710 and wrecked in 1715
- HMS Jamaica (1744), a 14-gun sloop launched 1744 and foundered 1770 off Jamaica
- HMS Jamaica (1779), a 16-gun sloop purchased in 1779 and sold in 1783
- HMS Jamaica, formerly the French 26-gun corvette Perçante, which HMS Intrepid captured in February 1796; she was taken in as a 26-gun sixth rate and sold in 1814.
- HMS Jamaica (1825), a 52-gun fourth rate ordered in 1825 and cancelled in 1829
- HMS Jamaica (C44), a Crown Colony-class cruiser launched in 1940 and scrapped in 1960
