= Robert Sherbrooke =

British officer and recipient of Victoria Cross (1901–1972)

Rear-Admiral Robert Sherbrooke VC CB DSO DL
- Born: 8 January 1901; Oxton, Nottinghamshire
- Died: 13 June 1972 (aged 71); Oxton, Nottinghamshire
- Burial place: St Peter and St Paul's churchyard, Oxton
- Spouse: Rosemary Neville Buckley (m. 1929)
- Children: Dione Digby, Lady Digby
- Military career
- Allegiance: United Kingdom
- Branch: Royal Navy
- Service years: 1917–1954
- Rank: Rear-Admiral
- Nickname: Rupert
- Commands: Flag Officer Germany (1951–53); HMS Daedalus III (1948–49); HMS Aurora (1945–46); HMS Condor (1943); HMS Onslow (1942–43); HMS Matabele (1940–41); HMS Cossack (1939–40); HMS Wakeful (1939)
- Conflicts: First World War; Second World War: Battle of the Barents Sea (WIA)
- Awards: Victoria Cross; Companion of the Order of the Bath; Distinguished Service Order; King Haakon VII Freedom Cross (Norway)
- Other work: Lord Lieutenant of Nottinghamshire

Rear-Admiral Robert St Vincent 'Rupert' Sherbrooke, VC, CB, DSO, DL (8 January 1901 – 13 June 1972) was a senior officer in the Royal Navy and a recipient of the Victoria Cross, the highest award for gallantry in the face of the enemy that can be awarded to British and Commonwealth forces.

== Early life ==
Born in Oxton, Nottinghamshire, Sherbrooke attended the Royal Naval Colleges of Osborne and Dartmouth and joined the Royal Navy in 1917 as a midshipman aboard HMS Canada. He was promoted to commander in 1935 and served aboard the aircraft carrier HMS Courageous. His wartime commands were all destroyers.

== Victoria Cross ==
Sherbrooke was 41 years old and a captain in the Royal Navy during the Second World War when the following deed took place during the Battle of the Barents Sea for which he was awarded the VC.

Captain Sherbrooke, in H.M.S. Onslow, was the Senior Officer in command of the destroyers escorting an important convoy [JW 51B] bound for North Russia. On the morning of 31st December [1942], off the North Cape, he made contact with a greatly superior enemy force [led by the heavy cruiser Hipper and the pocket battleship Lützow] which was attempting to destroy the convoy. Captain Sherbrooke led his destroyers into attack and closed the Enemy. Four times the Enemy tried to attack the convoy, but was forced each time to withdraw behind a smoke screen to avoid the threat of torpedoes, and each time Captain Sherbrooke pursued him and drove him outside gun range of the convoy and towards our covering forces. These engagements lasted about two hours, but after the first forty minutes H.M.S. Onslow was hit, and Captain Sherbrooke was seriously wounded in the face and temporarily lost the use of one eye. Nevertheless he continued to direct the ships under his command until further hits on his own ship compelled him to disengage, but not until he was satisfied that the next Senior Officer had assumed control. It was only then that he agreed to leave the bridge for medical attention, and until the convoy was out of danger he insisted on receiving all reports of the action.
His courage, his fortitude and his cool and prompt decisions inspired all around him. By his leadership and example the convoy was saved from damage and was brought safely to its destination.

Sherbrooke's actions – and the German ships' failure to neutralize the convoy despite its superior force – were pivotal in Hitler's order to end the use of surface fleet of the Kriegsmarine at the beginning of 1943.

== Later life ==
From July 1945 to mid-1946, Sherbrooke was commanding officer of the cruiser HMS Aurora.

He achieved the rank of rear admiral on 7 July 1951. He was Gentleman Usher of the Scarlet Rod from 1954 to 1964. From 1964 he was Registrar and Secretary to the Most Honourable Order of the Bath.

He was appointed High Sheriff of Nottinghamshire for 1958–59. His daughter is Dione Digby, Lady Digby. He died in his home town of Oxton, aged 71.
