= Robert Burnett =

Royal Navy officer (1887–1959)

Admiral Sir Robert Burnett GBE KCB DSO CStJ
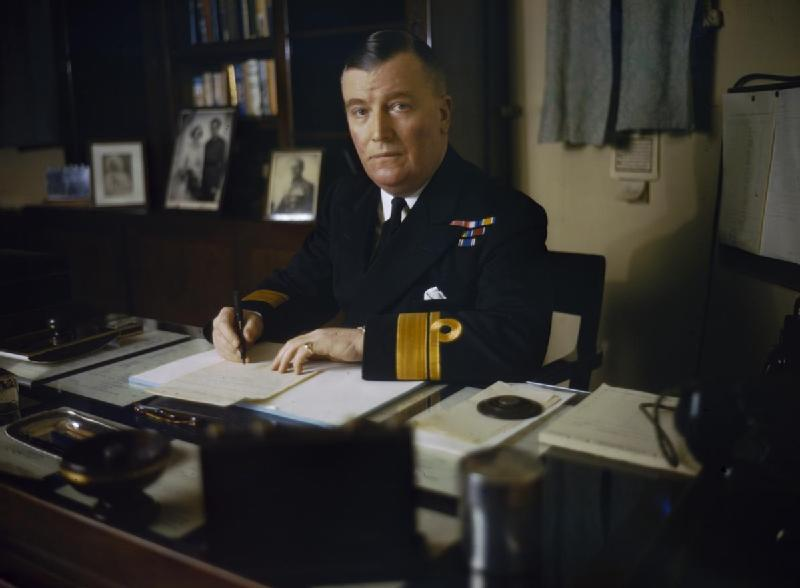
- Burnett, then a rear admiral, on board Destroyer Depot Ship HMS Tyne
- Born: 22 July 1887; Old Deer, Buchan, Aberdeenshire
- Died: 2 July 1959 (aged 71); 116 Pall Mall, Westminster, London
- Military career
- Allegiance: United Kingdom
- Branch: Royal Navy
- Service years: 1902–1950
- Rank: Admiral
- Commands: Plymouth Command (1947–50); South Atlantic Station (1944–46); 10th Cruiser Squadron (1943); Home Fleet Destroyer Flotillas (1942); Royal Naval Barracks, Chatham (1939–40); HMS Amphion (1935–39); HMS Curacoa (1933); 8th Destroyer Flotilla (1931–33); HMS Keppel (1931–33); HMS Wallflower (1925–27)
- Conflicts: World War I; Battle of Heligoland Bight; Battle of Dogger Bank; World War II; Battle of the Barents Sea; Battle of North Cape
- Awards: Knight Grand Cross of the Order of the British Empire; Knight Commander of the Order of the Bath; Distinguished Service Order; Commander of the Venerable Order of Saint John; Order of Suvorov, 1st Class (USSR); Order of George I (Greece); Order of Orange-Nassau (Netherlands)

Admiral Sir Robert Lindsay Burnett GBE KCB DSO CStJ (22 July 1887 – 2 July 1959) was an officer in the Royal Navy.

== Naval career ==
Educated at Eastman's Royal Naval Academy and Bedford School, Burnett joined the Royal Navy in 1902. He served on the China Station from 1904 and then with the Atlantic and Mediterranean Fleets from 1908. He became an instructor at the Navy Physical Training Schools in 1911.

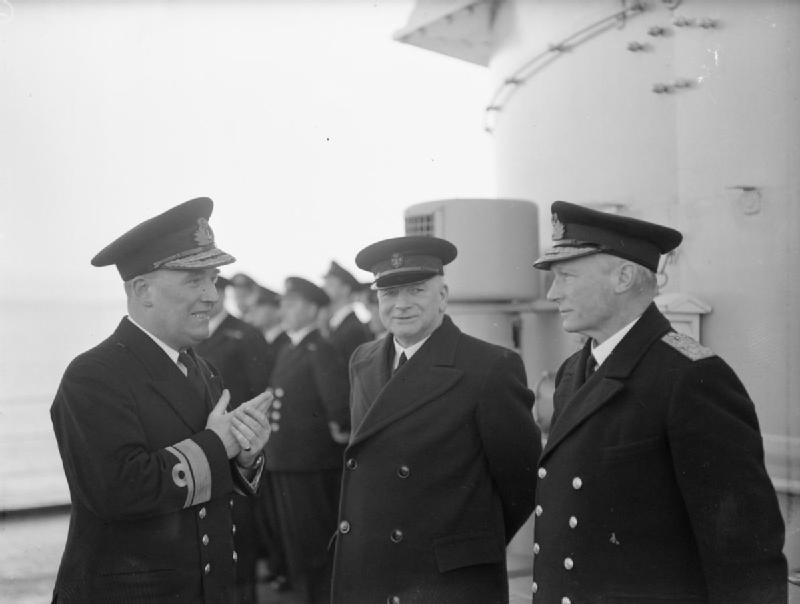
Burnett, left, with First Lord of the Admiralty A. V. Alexander and Admiral Sir John Tovey, C.-in-C. Home Fleet, on board HMS Belfast in January 1943

Burnett served in World War I and saw action at the Battle of Heligoland Bight in 1914, at the Battle of Dogger Bank in 1915 and served in destroyers in the Grand Fleet. He was promoted to lieutenant commander in April 1918, commander in December 1923 and captain in December 1930.

In 1933 Burnett was made Director of Physical Training and Sports. He was promoted rear admiral in January 1941, appointed flag officer of minelayers and from March 1942 flag officer of the Destroyer Flotillas of the Home Fleet. From January 1943 he was flag officer of the 10th Cruiser Squadron and was promoted to vice admiral in that role on 9 December 1943. Flying his flag in HMS Belfast, he saw action in the North Sea and in the Arctic Ocean off the coast of Norway in convoy escort duty, particularly on 26 December at the Battle of North Cape, where he played a major role in the sinking of the German battleship Scharnhorst (in most accounts of the battle he is described as a rear admiral). He was Commander-in-Chief, South Atlantic Station from 1944. He became Commander-in-Chief, Plymouth in 1947 and retired from active service in May 1950. He then served as the first director of the White Fish Authority, from its foundation in 1951 until his retirement in November 1954.

== Honours ==
Burnett was appointed an Officer of the Order of the British Empire (OBE) in the 1925 Birthday Honours.

== Family ==
In 1915 Burnett married Ethel Constance Shaw; they had no children. He was the younger brother of Air Chief Marshal Sir Charles Burnett.

Military offices
Preceded by Sir Campbell Tait	Commander-in-Chief, South Atlantic Station; 1944–1946	Succeeded by Sir Clement Moody
Preceded by Sir Henry Pridham-Wippell	Commander-in-Chief, Plymouth; 1947–1950	Succeeded by Sir Rhoderick McGrigor
