= HMS Obedient (G48) =

1942 O and P class destroyer

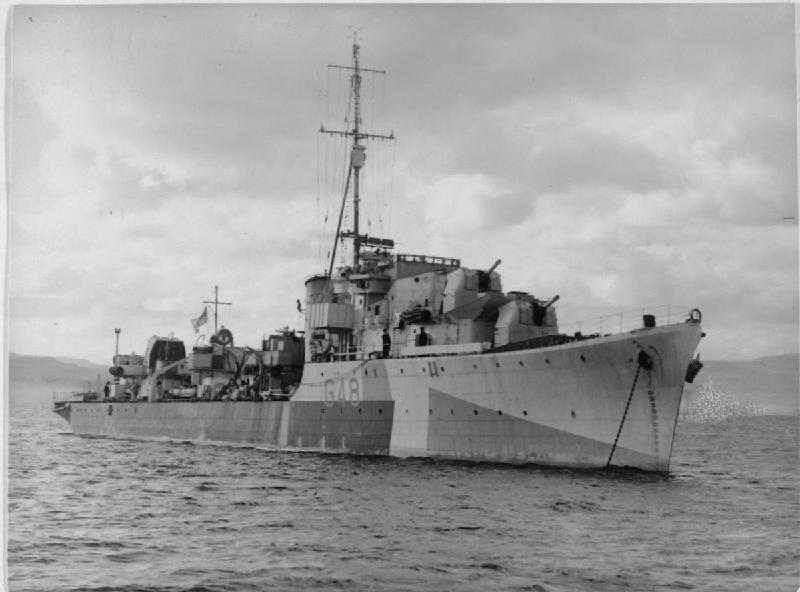
- HMS Obedient during the Second World War

History

United Kingdom
- Name: Obedient
- Ordered: 3 September 1939
- Builder: William Denny and Brothers, Dumbarton
- Laid down: 22 May 1940
- Launched: 30 April 1942
- Commissioned: 30 October 1942
- Identification: Pennant number G48 later D248
- Honours and awards: Jutland 1916; Arctic 1942-44; Barents Sea 1942; Atlantic 1943; Normandy 1944
- Fate: Scrapped 1962
- Badge: On a Field Blue, a sea dog sejant Proper, collared Gold

General characteristics
- Class & type: O-class destroyer
- Displacement: 1,610 long tons (1,640 t) (standard)
- Length: 345 ft (105.2 m) (o/a)
- Beam: 35 ft (10.7 m)
- Draught: 13 ft 6 in (4.1 m)
- Installed power: 2 × Admiralty 3-drum boilers; 40,000 shp (29,828 kW)
- Propulsion: 2 × shafts; 2 × geared steam turbines
- Speed: 37 knots (69 km/h; 43 mph)
- Range: 3,850 nmi (7,130 km; 4,430 mi) at 20 knots (37 km/h; 23 mph)
- Complement: 176+
- Armament: 5 × single QF 4 in (102 mm) AA gun; 1 × quad 2 pdr (40 mm (1.6 in)) AA gun; 4 × single 20 mm (0.8 in) AA guns; 1 × quadruple 21 in (533 mm) torpedo tubes; 2 × depth charges throwers; 60 × mines

HMS Obedient was an O-class destroyer of the Royal Navy. She was built by William Denny and Brothers of Dumbarton, between 1940 and 1942. During Warship Week in 1942 she was adopted by the civil community of Lymington, United Kingdom. She was scrapped in 1962.

== Service history ==
=== Second World War service ===
On commissioning Obedient joined the 17th Destroyer Flotilla for service with the Home Fleet. During the Second World War she escorted Arctic convoys in 1942 and 1944, and Atlantic convoys in 1943, taking part in the Battle of the Barents Sea in 1942.

During June 1944 she was deployed in the English Channel for patrol duties to assist with the Normandy landings. In April 1945 she was converted for mine-laying duties and undertook mine-laying duties in the Northwestern approaches.

She took part in the King's Birthday celebrations at Kiel on 2 June 1945 together with HMS Offa

=== Postwar service ===
In August 1946 Obedient underwent refit. Following this she took part in Operation "Deadlight", the destruction of surrendered U-boats in the Northwest Approaches. She then joined the Portsmouth Local Flotilla for use by the Torpedo School. The ship was reduced to Reserve status in October 1947 at Sheerness and was refitted in 1949. She was re-commissioned on 17 October 1952 and deployed at Portsmouth for service in the Local Flotilla. In 1953 she took part in the Fleet Review to celebrate the Coronation of Queen Elizabeth II.

After July 1953 she was used for Air-Sea rescue duties during air operations by aircraft carriers in the English Channel. After acceptance into the Reserve Fleet at Chatham in December that year she briefly commissioned for further service for trials in February 1956 but then returned to Reserve at Chatham. A proposal to convert this ship and Obdurate for use as anti-submarine frigates was not implemented and she was laid-up in Reserve at Hartlepool in 1957. The ship was put on the Disposal List in 1961 and sold to the British Iron & Steel Corporation (BISCO) for demolition by Hughes Bolckow. She arrived in tow at the Breakers yard in Blyth on 19 October 1962.
