= HMS Obdurate (G39) =

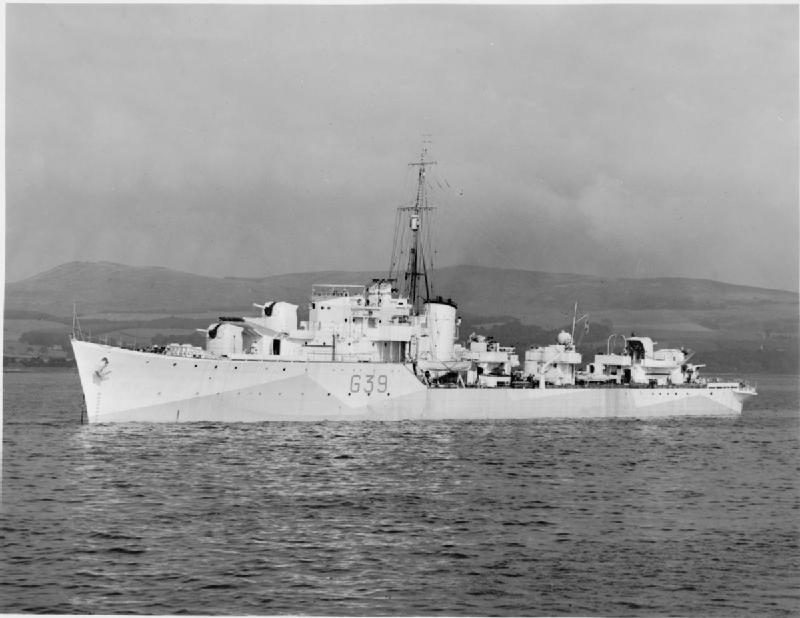

History

United Kingdom
- Name: Obdurate
- Ordered: 3 September 1939
- Builder: William Denny and Brothers, Dumbarton
- Laid down: 25 April 1940
- Launched: 19 February 1942
- Commissioned: 3 September 1942
- Identification: Pennant number: G39
- Honours and awards: Arctic 1942-44; Barents Sea 1942; Atlantic 1943
- Fate: Broken up, 1965
- Badge: On a field Blue, a mule statant white

General characteristics
- Class & type: O-class destroyer
- Displacement: 1,610 long tons (1,640 t) (standard)
- Length: 345 ft (105.2 m) (o/a)
- Beam: 35 ft (10.7 m)
- Draught: 13 ft 6 in (4.1 m)
- Installed power: 2 × Admiralty 3-drum boilers; 40,000 shp (29,828 kW)
- Propulsion: 2 × shafts; 2 × geared steam turbines
- Speed: 37 knots (69 km/h; 43 mph)
- Range: 3,850 nmi (7,130 km; 4,430 mi) at 20 knots (37 km/h; 23 mph)
- Complement: 176+
- Armament: 5 × single QF 4 in (102 mm) AA gun; 1 × quad 2 pdr (40 mm (1.6 in)) AA gun; 4 × single 20 mm (0.8 in) AA guns; 1 × quadruple 21 in (533 mm) torpedo tubes; 2 × depth charges throwers; 60 × mines

HMS Obdurate was an O-class destroyer of the Royal Navy. She was built by William Denny and Brothers of Dumbarton, being laid down at their yards on the River Clyde on 25 April 1940, launched on 19 February 1942 and commissioned on 3 September 1942.

== Service history ==
=== Second World War ===
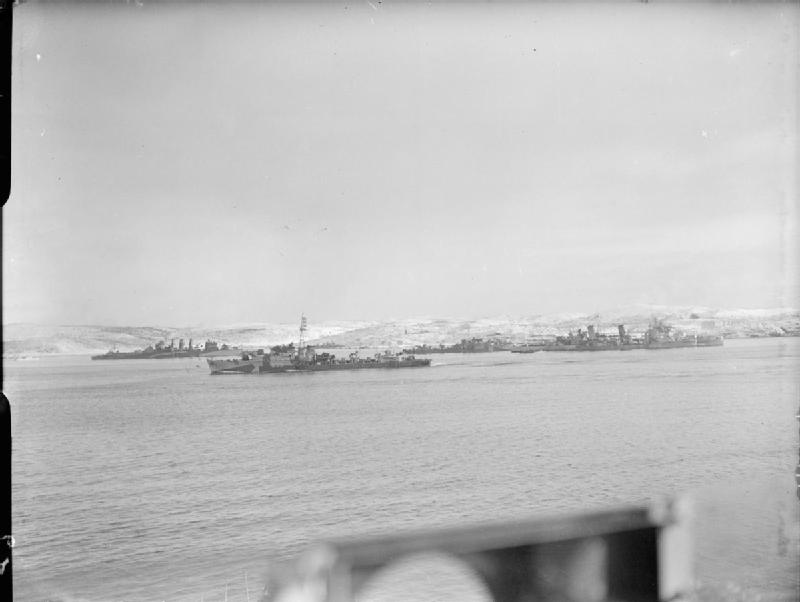
In the distance Obdurate (centre) leaving a Russian bay, with the cruisers Cumberland (left) and Belfast (right) with Faulknor alongside. Photograph taken at Vaenga after the arrival of convoy JW 53.

During the Second World War she escorted Arctic convoys in 1942 and 1944, and Atlantic convoys in 1943, taking part in the Battle of the Barents Sea in 1942.

In December 1942, while on escort for convoy JW 51B, she was attacked and damaged by the German heavy cruiser Admiral Hipper.

On 25 January 1944, she was torpedoed and damaged by the German submarine U-360, using a GNAT acoustic torpedo, southeast of Bear Island, while on escort for convoy JW 56A.

At the end of the war, she escorted the cruiser Norfolk whilst the latter took King Haakon VII back to Norway, followed by post-war work in German waters. On 14 July 1945 US president Harry Truman transferred to Obdurate from the cruiser USS Philadelphia in the English Channel to travel the rest of his journey to the Potsdam Conference.

=== Postwar service ===
After the war Obdurate was used for torpedo training at Portsmouth. In 1948 she was placed into reserve at HMNB Portsmouth before a refit on the Tyne 1949 and 1950. She was then held in reserve at Chatham Dockyard between 1950 and 1952. Between 1952 and 1956 she was part of the Nore local squadron. In 1953 she took part in the Fleet Review to celebrate the Coronation of Queen Elizabeth II.

Between 1957 and 1959 she was again held in reserve at Portsmouth. In 1959 she was used in tests by the NCRE at Rosyth. She was sold for scrap in 1964, arriving at Inverkeithing on 30 November of that year for breaking.
