= HMS Rhododendron (K78) =

Flower-class corvette

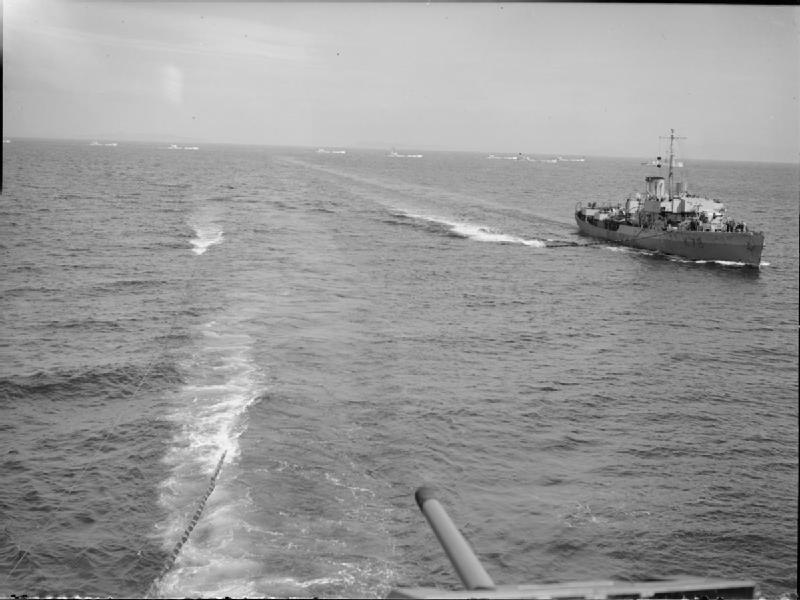
- HMS Rhododendron during refueling trials at sea

History

United Kingdom
- Name: HMS Rhododendron
- Ordered: 19 September 1939
- Builder: Harland and Wolff Ltd., Belfast, Northern Ireland
- Laid down: 22 May 1940
- Launched: 2 September 1940
- Commissioned: 18 October 1940
- Out of service: 17 May 1947 – placed in reserve
- Identification: Pennant number: K78
- Fate: Sold 1950; scrapped 1968

General characteristics
- Class & type: Flower-class corvette (original)
- Displacement: 925 long tons (940 t; 1,036 short tons)
- Length: 205 ft (62.48 m)o/a
- Beam: 33 ft (10.06 m)
- Draught: 11.5 ft (3.51 m)
- Propulsion: single shaft; 2 × fire tube Scotch boilers; 1 × 4-cycle triple-expansion reciprocating steam engine; 2,750 ihp (2,050 kW)
- Speed: 16 knots (29.6 km/h)
- Range: 3,500 nautical miles (6,482 km) at 12 knots (22.2 km/h)
- Complement: 85
- Sensors & processing systems: 1 × SW1C or 2C radar; 1 × Type 123A or Type 127DV sonar
- Armament: 1 × BL 4-inch (101.6 mm) Mk.IX single gun; 2 x double Lewis machine gun; 2 × twin Vickers machine gun; 2 × Mk.II depth charge throwers; 2 × Depth charge rails with 40 depth charges; initially with minesweeper equipment, later removed

HMS Rhododendron was a Flower-class corvette that served with the Royal Navy during the Second World War. She served as an ocean escort in the Battle of the Atlantic.

== Background ==
The ship was ordered on 19 September 1939 from Harland & Wolff in Belfast, Northern Ireland. The ship's keel was laid on 22 May 1940, and the ship was launched on 2 September. The ship was commissioned about one month later, on 18 October.

== War Service ==
On 21 November 1940, Rhododendron, part of the escort for Convoy OB244, attacked the German U-boat U-103 with depth charges, helping to drive the submarine away from the convoy. Although U-103 escaped unscathed, this attack led to the incorrect claim that Rhododendron had sunk U-104. That same day, she picked up 36 survivors from the merchant ship Daydawn, which earlier that day had been sunk by U-103. At the beginning of 1941, Rhododendron was part of the 8th Escort Group. On 17 January 1941, she detonated a mine in Liverpool harbor, knocking out her engines and steering gear and causing minor structural damage. Rhododendron was under repair at Liverpool for three months. On 28 July 1941, she picked up 26 survivors from the Lapland, a merchant ship which was torpedoed by U-203. On 1 October 1941, Rhododendron was part of the 36th Escort Group, based at Liverpool.

In November 1942, the British and Americans landed in French North Africa in Operation Torch, with Rhododendron helping to escort one of the convoys carrying invasion forces from Britain to the Centre Task Force beaches at Arzew near Oran in Algeria on 9 November. On 4 July 1943, she picked up more than 300 survivors from several merchant ships which were torpedoed by German submarines U-409 and U-375 off of Algeria.

== Fate ==
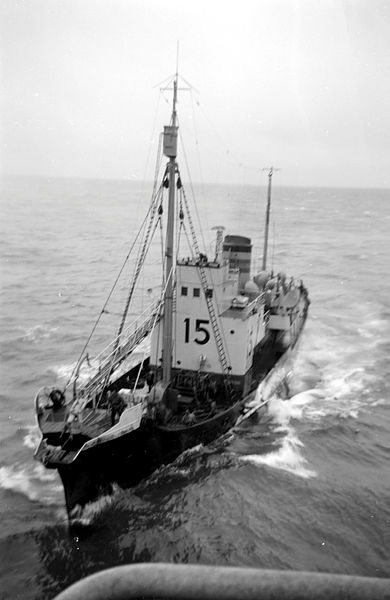
Whale catcher Maj Vinke

She was sold in 1950 to a shipping company, where she was turned into the merchant Maj Finke. She was sold for demolition in South Africa in 1968.

== Sources ==
- Blair, Clay (2000). Hitler's U-boat War: The Hunters 1939–1942. London: Cassell & Co. ISBN 0-304-35260-8.
- Friedman, Norman (2008). British Destroyers & Frigates – The Second World War and After. Barnsley, UK: Seaforth Publishing. ISBN 978-1-84832-015-4.
- Gardiner, Robert; Chesneau, Roger, eds. (1980). Conway's All the World's Fighting Ships 1922–1946. London: Conway Maritime Press. ISBN 0-85177-146-7.
- H.M. Ships Damaged or Sunk by Enemy Action: 3rd. SEPT. 1939 to 2nd. SEPT. 1945. Admiralty. 1952.
- Lynch, John (2012). Belfast Built Ships. Stroud, UK: The History Press. ISBN 978-075246-539-5.
- Preston, Antony; Raven, Alan (1982). Flower Class Corvettes. London: Arms and Armour Press. ISBN 0-85368-559-2.
- Rohwer, Jürgen; Hümmelchen, Gerhard (1992). Chronology of the War at Sea 1939–1945. London: Greenhill Books. ISBN 1-85367-117-7.
- Ruegg, Bob; Hague, Arnold (1992). Convoys to Russia: 1941–1945. Kendal, UK: World Ship Society. ISBN 0-905617-66-5.
- Winser, John de S. (2002). British Invasion Fleets: The Mediterranean and beyond 1942–1945. Gravesend, UK: World Ship Society. ISBN 0-9543310-0-1.
