= HMS Oribi =

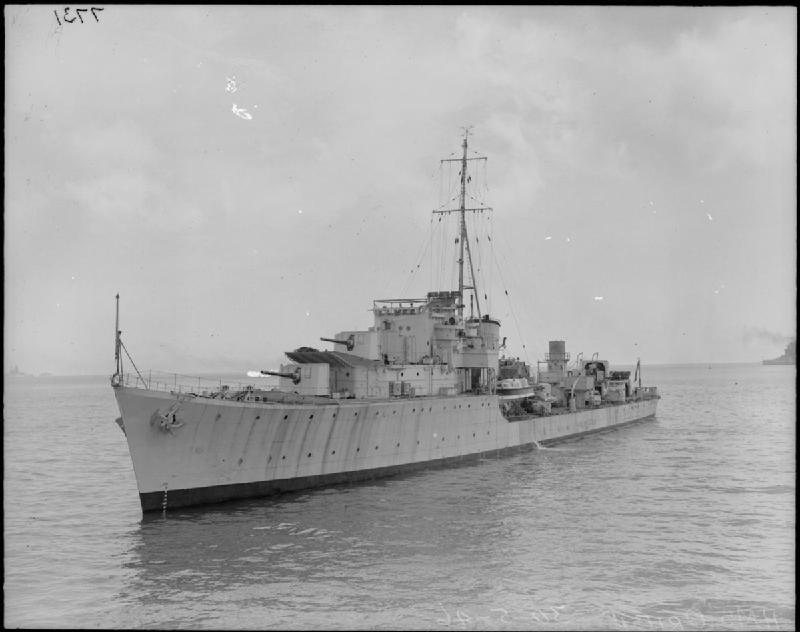
- HMS Oribi

History

United Kingdom
- Name: Oribi
- Ordered: 3 September 1939
- Builder: Fairfield Shipbuilding and Engineering Company, Govan
- Laid down: 15 January 1940
- Launched: 14 January 1941
- Commissioned: 5 July 1941
- Decommissioned: 1 January 1946
- Honours and awards: Norway 1941; Malta convoys 1941; North Africa 1942; Arctic convoys 1942–1944; Atlantic 1943–1944; Normandy 1944
- Fate: Sold to Turkey

Turkey
- Name: Gayret
- Acquired: 1946
- Fate: Scrapped 1965

General characteristics
- Class & type: O-class destroyer
- Displacement: 1,610 long tons (1,640 t) (standard)
- Length: 345 ft (105.2 m) (o/a)
- Beam: 35 ft (10.7 m)
- Draught: 13 ft 6 in (4.1 m)
- Installed power: 2 × Admiralty 3-drum boilers; 40,000 shp (29,828 kW)
- Propulsion: 2 × shafts; 2 × geared steam turbines
- Speed: 37 knots (69 km/h; 43 mph)
- Range: 3,850 nmi (7,130 km; 4,430 mi) at 20 knots (37 km/h; 23 mph)
- Complement: 176+
- Armament: 4 × single QF 4.7 in (120 mm) guns; 1 × single QF 4 in (102 mm) AA gun; 1 × quad 2 pdr (40 mm (1.6 in)) AA gun; 4 × single 20 mm (0.8 in) AA guns; 1 × quadruple 21 in (533 mm) torpedo tubes; 4 × throwers and 2 × racks for 70 depth charges

HMS Oribi (G66) was an O-class destroyer of the Royal Navy. Following the style of her sister ships, she was named with a word beginning with O. She was to have been named HMS Observer; because her building was sponsored by the South African government, she was named HMS Oribi, after the oribi, a South African antelope. In 1942, after a successful warship week, the ship was "adopted" by Havant, Hampshire.

== Second World War service ==
On 4 August 1941 Oribi carried the British Prime Minister, Winston Churchill, and senior officers from Scrabster to Scapa Flow, where the group embarked on HMS Prince of Wales for passage to Newfoundland and the secret meeting with US President Franklin D Roosevelt at which the Atlantic Charter was signed.

Oribi was one of the destroyers that supported Operation Archery, a commando raid on Norway in November 1941, by shelling the islands and attacking German shipping in the anchorage. She also assisted in bringing Norwegian nationals home after the raid to escape the German occupation.

She saw extensive action during the Arctic and North Atlantic convoys of the Second World War. These included Convoy ONS 5 in May 1943, regarded as the turning point of the Battle of the Atlantic. At 03:00 on 6 May 1943 U-125 was located by radar in thick fog, rammed by Oribi and disabled, she was unable to dive. At 03:54 the U-boat was sighted by the Flower-class corvettes Snowflake and Sunflower, as Snowflake manoeuvred to attack, closing to 100 yd (91 m), the crew of U-125, realising their indefensible position, scuttled the boat. The captain of Snowflake signalled the Senior Officer Escort, Lieutenant Commander Robert Sherwood, proposing to pick them up and received the response, "Not approved to pick up survivors". Snowflake and Sunflower abandoned the Germans to their fate and resumed their positions around the convoy, while the crew of U-125 died in the Atlantic over the next few hours.

== Postwar service ==
Oribi was transferred to the Turkish Navy in 1946 and renamed Gayret, to replace a previous ship of that name requisitioned by the Royal Navy during the Second World War and sunk. She received the new pennant number D15 and was used as a headquarters ship.
