= Kampfgeschwader 25 =

German bomber wing of World War II

- Active: August – September 1939
- Country: Nazi Germany
- Branch: Luftwaffe
- Type: Bomber
- Role: Maritime interdiction
- Size: Air force wing

Commanders
- Notable commanders: Helmuth Pohle

Insignia
- Identification symbol: Geschwaderkennung of 4D

Kampfgeschwader 25 (KG 25) was a short-lived Luftwaffe bomber wing during World War II. Formed from the crews and aircraft of Erprobungskommando 88, KG 25 operated the Junkers Ju 88. In September 1939, KG 25 was disbanded after its Staffeln were redesignated as the first Gruppe of Kampfgeschwader 30.

== Operational history ==
Before the outbreak of World War II, Erprobungskommando 88, commanded by Hauptmann Helmuth Pohle, had been formed at Rechlin to test the Junkers Ju 88. In August 1939, 12 crews and their Ju 88 aircraft were transferred to Jever, where they were designated as the first Staffel of Kampfgeschwader 25 (1./KG 25).

After the British declaration of war on Germany on 3 September, the 10th Flieger-Division was formed to target British shipping. Due to the 10th Flieger-Division being understrength as a result of aircraft being committed to the Invasion of Poland, the 12 Ju 88s of 1./KG 25 were attached to the division. However, General der Flieger Hellmuth Felmy, the commander of Luftflotte 2, did not believe that the new unit, while still undergoing technical trials of their aircraft, should be sent into combat in this manner. Consequently, 1./KG 25 was withdrawn to Greifswald, where six Ju 88s were forming 2./KG 25.

On 7 September, 1./KG 25 and 2./KG 25 were redesignated. The two Staffeln formed the first Gruppe of Kampfgeschwader 30 (I./KG 30), remaining under the command of Hauptmann Pohle. As a result, KG 25 was disbanded.

== Commanding officers ==
- Hauptmann Helmuth Pohle, August – September 1939
