= Rieckhoff =

Rieckhoff is a surname. Notable people with the surname include:

- Herbert Rieckhoff (1898–1948), German general
- Paul Rieckhoff (fl. from 1998), American veteran and activist
