= Helmuth Pohle =

German World War II pilot

Helmuth Pohle was a German aviator during World War II. In October 1939 he led the first German aerial attack on the United Kingdom, during which he was shot down and captured. He was the first German prisoner of war in World War II.

== Battle of the River Forth ==
Hauptmann (equivalent to Flight Lieutenant) Pohle, was the group commanding officer (Gruppenkommandeur), of Kampfgeschwader 30 (I. KG 30) from Westerland, Germany in Sylt and led the German raid known as the Battle of the River Forth. On 16 October 1939 with fifteen Ju 88 aircraft, leaving Germany at 11:00. Westerland was the nearest Luftwaffe base to Britain. His second-in-command was Oberleutnant Hans Storp. His group of fifteen aircraft flew over the Forth Bridge at around 14.30. German intelligence believed that there were no Spitfire squadrons in Scotland. At 12.25pm a power cut had disabled the radar at RAF Dronehill.

=== Capture ===
He was shot down by Squadron Leader Ernest Stevens, the commanding officer of 603 Sqn, based at RAF Turnhouse (now Edinburgh Airport). After the left engine was hit at around 14:55 the attack by the Spitfire injured the rear gunner and radio operator. Nine Ju 88s were intercepted by three Spitfires at 4,000 ft. This was the second downing of an aircraft by a Supermarine Spitfire, and by any aircraft in the war by RAF Fighter Command. Pohle's aircraft did not land on UK soil but in the sea, three miles east of Crail. He was the only survivor out of his crew of four.

Another Ju 88 from KG 30 was shot down soon afterwards, caught by five Spitfires. In total for the attack, the Germans lost two Ju 88 aircraft, with four airmen captured.

Pohle was taken to the hospital at Edinburgh Castle. He saw out the war at Grizedale Hall in the Lake District, at No 1 POW Camp. He later helped Franz von Werra to escape.

== See also ==
- Sergeant George Booth, of 107 Sqn, first British PoW, when his Bristol Blenheim was shot down over the German coast on 4 September 1939
- 18-year-old Private Helmut Roemer, when guarding the Pegasus Bridge (then Bénouville Bridge) on the morning of 6 June 1944, became the first German soldier to face the Allied invasion; he was captured the next day
- 28-year-old Lt Den Brotheridge, the first Allied soldier killed on 6 June 1944; he had left RAF Tarrant Rushton on 5 June and landed in Normandy, France, just after midnight. He took part in the British 6th Airborne Division's effort to capture of the Caen canal and Orne river bridges, to support the 3rd Division landing later that day.
- Staff Sergeant Jim Wallwork, the first Allied soldier on French soil, after being catapulted through the Horsa glider windscreen
- The first Heinkel He 111 was brought down was at Humbie on 28 October 1939, '1H + JA' of KG.26, intercepted by 602 Sqn
