= Hanns Heise =

Hanns Horst Heise
- Born: 1 February 1913; Treuenbrietzen, German Empire
- Died: 18 May 1992 (aged 79); Cologne, Germany
- Military career
- Allegiance: Nazi Germany (to 1945); West Germany
- Branch: Reichsmarine; Luftwaffe; German Air Force
- Service years: 1934–45; 1956–71
- Rank: Oberstleutnant (Wehrmacht); Brigadegeneral (Bundeswehr)
- Commands: I./KG 76; IV./KG 76; KG 51; KG 2 KG 40; KG 30
- Conflicts: World War II: Invasion of Poland; Battle of France; Battle of Britain; Eastern Front; Operation Steinbock
- Awards: Knight's Cross of the Iron Cross

Hanns Horst Heise (1 February 1913 – 18 May 1992) was a highly decorated Oberstleutnant in the Luftwaffe during World War II, and a recipient of the Knight's Cross of the Iron Cross. The Knight's Cross of the Iron Cross, and its variants were the highest awards in the military and paramilitary forces of Nazi Germany during World War II.

== Awards and decorations ==
- Aviator badge
- Front Flying Clasp of the Luftwaffe
- Ehrenpokal der Luftwaffe (15 September 1941)
- Iron Cross (1939)
  - 2nd Class
  - 1st Class
- German Cross in Gold (13 January 1942)
- Knight's Cross of the Iron Cross on 3 September 1942 as Hauptmann and Gruppenkommandeur of the IV./Kampfgeschwader 76
- Legion of Merit 1971

Military offices
Preceded by Hauptmann Robert von Sichart	Gruppenkommandeur of I./KG 76 ? – March 1942	Succeeded by Unknown
Preceded by Hauptmann Gerhard Kröchel	Gruppenkommandeur of IV./KG 76; March 1942 – 9 May 1943	Succeeded by Major Günter Beyer
Preceded by Major Egbert von Frankenberg und Proschlitz	Geschwaderkommodore of Kampfgeschwader 51; 9 May 1943 – 25 February 1944	Succeeded by Oberstleutnant Wolf Dietrich Meister
Preceded by Oberstleutnant Karl Kessel	Geschwaderkommodore of Kampfgeschwader 2; 25 February 1944 – April 1944	Succeeded by Major Wilhelm Rath
Preceded by Oberst Rupprecht Heyn	Geschwaderkommodore of Kampfgeschwader 40; November 1944 – February 1945	Succeeded by None
Preceded by Oberst Bernhard Jope	Geschwaderkommodore of Kampfgeschwader 30; February 1945 – May 1945	Succeeded by None
