= SS Empire Elgar =

World War II merchant ship of the United Kingdom

History
- Name: Empire Elgar (1942–1947); Sea Minstrel (1947–1951); Marandellas (1951–1956); Edward Jansen (1956–1960); Slitan (1960–1961); Pirin (1961–1965)
- Owner: Ministry of War Transport (1942–1945); Ministry of Transport (1945–1947); Dover Navigation Co Ltd (1947–1951); Drayton Steamship Co Ltd (1951–1956); I Jansen (1956–1960); Skibs A/S Katlander (1960–1961); Navigation Maritime Bulgare (1961–1965)
- Operator: Dover Navigation Co Ltd (1942–1951); Drayton Steamship Co Ltd (1951–1956); I Jansen (1956–1960); Skibs A/S Katlander (1960–1961); Navigation Maritime Bulgare (1961–1965)
- Port of registry: (United Kingdom) West Hartlepool, UK (1942–1947); (United Kingdom) London (1947–1951); (United Kingdom) Newcastle upon Tyne (1951–1956); Bergen, Norway (1956–1961); Varna, Bulgaria (1961–1965)
- Builder: William Gray & Co Ltd
- Launched: 17 February 1942
- Completed: April 1942
- Maiden voyage: 2 May 1942
- Identification: United Kingdom Official Number 168938 (1942–1956); Code Letters BDRL (1942–1956)
- Fate: Scrapped

General characteristics
- Class & type: Heavy lift ship
- Tonnage: 2,847 GRT; 1,695 NRT
- Length: 315 ft 4 in (96.11 m)
- Beam: 46 ft 5 in (14.15 m)
- Draught: 20 ft 10 3/4 in (6.369 m)
- Depth: 23 ft 0 in (7.01 m)
- Installed power: 269 NHP
- Propulsion: Triple expansion steam engine
- Crew: 27 + 9 DEMS gunners (Empire Elgar)

Empire Elgar was a 2,847 GRT heavy lift ship that was built in 1942 by William Gray & Co Ltd, West Hartlepool, Co Durham, United Kingdom for the Ministry of War Transport (MoWT). During World War II, she served with the Arctic Convoys. In 1947, she was sold into merchant service and renamed Sea Minstrel. A further sale in 1951 saw her renamed Marandellas. In 1956, she was sold to a Norwegian company and renamed Edward Jansen. A further sale in 1960 saw her renamed Slitan. In 1961, she was sold to a Bulgarian company and renamed Pirin (Bulgarian: Пирин). She served until 1965 when she was scrapped at Split, Yugoslavia.

== Description ==
The ship was built in 1942 by William Gray & Co Ltd, West Hartlepool, Co Durham.

The ship was 315 feet 4 inches (96.11 m) long, with a beam of 46 feet 5 inches (14.15 m). She had depth of 23 feet 0 inches (7.01 m) and a draught of 20 feet 10 3/4 inches (6.369 m).

The ship was propelled by a 269 nhp triple expansion steam engine, which had cylinders of 20 inches (51 cm), 31 inches (79 cm) and 55 inches (140 cm) diameter by 39 inches (99 cm) stroke. The engine was built by the Central Marine Engine Works, West Hartlepool.

== History ==
=== World War II ===
Empire Elgar was launched on 17 February 1942 and completed in April. The United Kingdom Official Number 168938 and Code Letters BDRL were allocated. Her port of registry was West Hartlepool and she was placed under the management of the Dover Navigation Co Ltd. She had a crew of 27, plus nine DEMS gunners.

Empire Elgar arrived at Middlesbrough, Yorkshire on 18 April 1942. After loading a cargo of war materiel, she made her maiden voyage on 2 May, joining Convoy FN 697, which had departed from Southend, Essex that day and arrived at Methil, Fife on 4 May. She then joined Convoy EN 81, which departed on 6 May and arrived at Oban, Argyllshire on 9 May. She left the convoy at Loch Ewe on 8 May, joining Convoy UR 23, which departed that day and arrived at Reykjavík, Iceland on 12 May. Empire Elgar was a member of Convoy PQ 16, which departed on 21 May. On 24 May, the convoy was spotted by a Blohm & Voss Ha 139 reconnaissance aircraft. The convoy was to remain under aerial surveillance for the next six days. On 25 May, an attempt was made to bomb the convoy, but no hits were scored. This was followed by a second attack, also unsuccessful. When a third attack was mounted that evening, the CAM ship Empire Lawrence launched her Hawker Sea Hurricane, but the pilot was wounded whilst attacking five Junkers Ju 88s, of which one was shot down and another damaged. The pilot bailed out and his aircraft crashed into the sea. DEMS gunners on Empire Elgar damaged two aircraft, with one probably destroyed. The attacks continued into the next day. On reaching the entrance to the White Sea, progress was slowed by ice. Two icebreakers were required to clear a passage. PQ16 arrived at Murmansk, Soviet Union on 30 May. Empire Elgar's destination was Arkhangelsk. She moored in the Dvina Bay some 5 nautical miles (9.3 km) from the town, where a new quay was under construction.

Amongst her crew were Able Seamen George Kitchener Patterson and Harry Smith and Second Officer Maurice Irvin. Patterson and Smith were awarded British Empire Medals and Irvin was awarded an MBE for their actions whilst Empire Elgar was under attack. These were Gazetted on 30 July 1943.

The ship sailed in a convoy which, for six days, was attacked almost continuously by submarines and from the air, but the vessel survived and arrived safely. During the passage of the convoy an excellent defence was put up by the ship. Many hits were registered on enemy aircraft and on one occasion three of the planes were set on fire, one being seen to crash into the sea. An attempt was made to ram an enemy submarine, and although this was unsuccessful, the ship's accurate fire kept the enemy submerged.

The Second Officer was the Gunnery Officer of the ship and his courage, skill and leadership were mainly responsible for the excellent defence of the vessel which resulted in the probable destruction of at least one enemy aircraft and severe damage to others.

Able Seamen Patterson and Smith did splendid work at the guns and by their courage, coolness and accuracy of fire succeeded in beating off the many attacks to which the ship was subjected.

Empire Elgar was equipped with derricks enabling her to unload the heavy war stores (locomotives, tanks and aircraft) from other ships that arrived with Convoy PQ 16. Amongst her cargo were tanks. Once she had discharged her cargo, Empire Elgar unloaded other ships' cargos into her hold, returned to the quayside and then put the transferred cargo ashore. She assisted in unloading the survivors of the ill-fated Convoy PQ 17. In September, Empire Elgar was ordered to Molotovosk. Five ships from a convoy ran aground on a sandbank and she was sent to unload their cargos in order to refloat the ships. Empire Elgar returned to Arkhangelsk to unload. She was then ordered to Murmansk to relieve Empire Bard. The 550 nautical miles (1,020 km) voyage taking 24 hours due to the poor quality of the Russian coal. On arrival at Murmansk, it was discovered that the port had been under attack for the previous three days. Murmansk was under almost constant attack as the Germans had possession of airfields only 55 nautical miles (102 km) away. In December, a convoy reached the Murmansk area. Empire Elgar sailed down the Dvina River to where a jetty served the naval base and airfield. She unloaded a cargo of aircraft from the American Liberty ship J. L. M. Curry, returning to Murmansk on 29 December. Convoy JW 51B arrived at the Kola Inlet on 3 January 1943. Empire Elgar assisted in unloading the ships which reached Murmansk, although this was delayed by problems with her winches.

Empire Elgar remained in the Soviet Union until August 1944. She was a member of Convoy RA 59A, which departed from the Kola Inlet on 28 August and arrived at Loch Ewe on 5 September. She was carrying 195 long tons (218 tonnes) of ammunition and was bound for Leith, Midlothian, where she was to receive further instructions. She joined convoy WN 630, which departed on 7 September and arrived at Methil two days later.

Empire Elgar departed from Methil on 29 October, spending the next five months sailing between Methil and Southend in various FN and FS convoys. She visited Sunderland, Co Durham from 12 to 15 December, the Tyne from 27 December to 5 January 1945 and again from 31 January to 13 February. She departed from Southend on 19 February as a member of Convoy FN 1638, which arrived at Methil on 21 February. Empire Elgar left the convoy at Great Yarmouth, Norfolk, on 20 February. She sailed the next day to join Convoy FN 1640, which had departed from Southend that day and arrived at Methil on 23 February. She left the convoy at the Tyne on 22 February.

Empire Elgar sailed on 7 March for Blyth, Northumberland, arriving later that day. She departed on 10 March, joining Convoy FN 1656, which had departed from Southend the previous day and arrived at Methil on 11 March. She joined Convoy EN 480, which departed on 13 March and arrived at Loch Ewe two days later. Empire Elgar was a member of Convoy UR 157, which departed on 15 March and arrived at Reykjavik on 20 March. She departed for the Tyne on 2 April, arriving on 11 April via convoys RU 158, WN 684 and FS 1780. She departed on 22 April, joining Convoy FN 1693, which had departed from Southend the previous day and arrived at Methil on 23 April. Reykjavik was reached on 1 May via convoys EN 488 and UR 161.

=== Post-war ===
Empire Elgar was a member of Convoy RU 163, which departed from Reykjavik on 22 May 1945 and arrived at the Belfast Lough on 27 May. She was carrying a cargo of cod liver oil. She then sailed to Grangemouth, Stirlingshire, arriving the next day. Empire Elgar departed on 1 June for Hull, Yorkshire, arriving two days later. She sailed on 22 June for Liverpool, Lancashire, arriving on 26 June and departing on 3 July for London, where she arrived on 6 July. She departed for Liverpool on 20 July, arriving four days later.

In 1947, Empire Elgar was sold to her managers. She was renamed Sea Minstrel. In 1951, she was sold to Drayton Steamship Co Ltd, Newcastle upon Tyne and renamed Marandellas.

In 1956, Marandellas was sold to I Jansen, Bergen, Norway and renamed Edward Jansen. She was sold in 1960 to Skibs A/S Katlander and renamed Slitan. In 1961, she was sold to the Bulgarian Government-owned Navigation Maritime Bulgare, Varna and renamed Pirin. She served until 1965, arriving on 1 October at Split, Yugoslavia for scrapping.
