= Kampfgeschwader 2 =

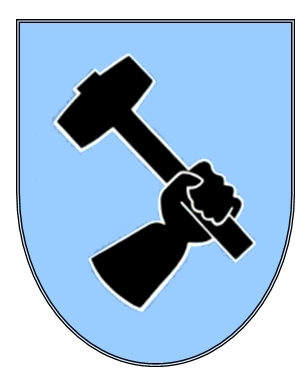
- Active: 1939–1944
- Country: Nazi Germany
- Branch: Luftwaffe
- Type: Bomber Wing
- Role: Tactical and Direct Ground Support.
- Size: Air Force Wing
- Nickname: Holzhammer (wooden mallet)
- Engagements: Invasion of Poland; Battle of Belgium; Battle of France; Battle of Britain; The Blitz; German invasion of Yugoslavia; Battle of Greece; Battle of Crete; Operation Barbarossa; Dieppe raid Battle of the Atlantic; Battle of Normandy; Operation Steinbock

Insignia
- Identification symbol: Geschwaderkennung of U5

Kampfgeschwader 2 Holzhammer (KG 2/Battle Wing 2) was a Luftwaffe bomber unit during the Second World War. The unit was formed in May 1939. The unit operated the Dornier Do 17 light bomber, Dornier Do 217 and Junkers Ju 188 medium bombers. During the Second World War, KG 2 lost 767 aircraft destroyed and 158 damaged. According to H.L. de Zeng et al. it suffered the loss of 1,908 personnel killed in action or missing in action and 214 as prisoners of war. During the war KG 2 lost 1,228 men killed, 688 missing, 656 wounded and with 214 captured, for a total of 2,786 in combat and non-combat operations.

== Formation ==
Stab/.KG 2 and I./KG 2 were formed on 1 May 1939 at Cottbus. II./KG 2 was formed at Liegnitz, Silesia. The crews converted onto Junkers Ju 86. The unit spent most of the summer training and recruiting personnel from the flight schools in night flying.

== World War II ==
=== Invasion of Poland ===
On 25 August the unit was transferred to Jesau and participated in the Invasion of Poland. Stab/KG 2 was withdrawn on 20 September and placed under the Command of Luftflotte 3 carrying out reconnaissance missions over France. I. KG 2 attacked airfields at Wilna and Lida and Płock on 1 September and again on 2 September. From 2–3 September it supported the German Third Army and German Fourth Army north of Warsaw. From 4–11 September rail targets were again bombed. Troop concentrations became the main targets after this until the end of the fighting in Poland. Stab./ KG 2 and II. KG 2 also operated in support of I. Gruppe. Altogether, the three Grupen had contributed 84 Dornier Do 17Z aircraft to the campaign.

=== Battle of France and the Low Countries ===
I./KG 2 supported German Army Group A's crossing of the Meuse. It supported Heinz Guderian's Panzerkorps in the vicinity of Sedan during the battle of 12–14 May. It fielded 36 Dornier Do 17s, with 22 aircraft serviceable. It also hit French Air Force airfields in Amiens, Reims, Champagne and Arras. Between 21 and 31 May 1940, I. Gruppe supported ground forces during the Battle of Dunkirk. On 3 June 1940 it participated in the huge aerial offensive against French air power in Operation Paula.

II./KG 2 committed 36 Do 17s (28 operational) to the western campaign in Fliegerkorps II. It assisted in all the major operations of the French Campaign. III./KG 2 supported the other two Gruppen with 36 Do 17s, with 30 serviceable. The worst day of the western campaign for KG 2 was 27 May, when Major Werner Kreipe's III. Gruppe lost 11 out of 27 Do 17s to RAF fighters over Dunkirk.

=== Kanalkampf ===
In mid-1940, I./KG 2 deployed up to 43 Do 17s (27 operational) against Britain while based at Epinoy. The Geschwader took part in the first large dogfight over the English Channel, on 10 July 1940 – the day usually considered to be the beginning of the Battle of Britain. In an attack on Convoy "Bread", KG 2 sank two ships and one 700-ton sloop and damaged four RAF fighters. In return three Do 17s were lost and three damaged, along with three Messerschmitt Bf 110s destroyed and a Messerschmitt Bf 109 shot down, with two damaged. On 10 August, KG 2 attacked Convoy "Booty", losing three Dorniers and six damaged.

=== Battle of Britain ===
On 13 August Adlertag (Eagle Day) KG 2 took off at 4:50 am led by Geschwaderkommodore Johannes Fink, to attack targets in southern Britain. They were to be escorted by Bf 110s from ZG 26 led by Oberstleutnant Joachim-Friedrich Huth. The weather was poor and German ground controllers ordered the fighters back to base. The message did not get through to II. and III./KG 2. Huth tried to signal them by flying in front of them and performing aerobatics. Fink ignored him and flew on. He flew around the coast to his target, Eastchurch airfield on the Isle of Sheppey. Albert Kesselring had issued orders for bombers to abandon missions if their escorts did not show up. But some Bf 109s from Erprobungsgruppe 210 had not received the order either and Fink failed to turn back as he was not disobeying the directive. The return would take KG 2 across the area of 11 Group, which would have been disastrous. Owing to the radar plotters missing the raiders, and the Observer Corps misjudging the bearing or route of the raid, the RAF failed to prevent the target being attacked. On the return journey No. 74 Squadron RAF, No. 111 Squadron RAF and No. 151 Squadron RAF managed to intercept, shooting down five Do 17s. KG 2 claimed destroyed ten Supermarine Spitfires on the ground and wrecked the airfield. In fact it would seem none were lost.

By 7 September, the strength of I./KG 2 had fallen to 19 machines, with 12 operational. II./KG 2 began operations over Britain with 35 Do 17s, 31 operational. By 7 September this had fallen to 30 and 20 respectively. III./KG 2 succeeded in replacing most of its losses; the number employed on 13 August was 34 Do 17s and 32 operational. The figures were the same on 7 September. The Geschwader was also in action on 15 September 1940. It continued to strike at targets during the Blitz, before transferring to Austria on 28 March 1941, to prepare for operations during the German invasion of Yugoslavia.

=== Balkans Campaign ===
I. Gruppe committed 29 Do 17s with 28 operational. It participated in the bombing of Belgrade, the Battle of Greece and Battle of Crete attacking ground and naval targets. On 20 May 1941 the unit claimed many Allied ships sunk north of Crete. It reported the loss of 6 Do 17s and 7 damaged. II. Gruppe did not take part. III. Gruppe participated with 30 Do 17s, 29 operational. It reported losses of 6 aircraft shot down and 5 damaged during the campaign. During June 1941 I./KG 2 was partially converted to the Do 217.

=== Eastern Front ===
I. and III./KG 2 supported both Army Group North and Army Group Centre in several major engagements. KG 2 supported German forces during the Battle of Białystok–Minsk, Battle of Smolensk, Siege of Leningrad and Battle of Moscow. III./KG 2 returned to Germany on 26 September to convert onto the Do 217. I./KG 2 departed for Germany on 31 October 1941. Total losses for Kampfgeschwader 2 on the Eastern Front in 1941 indicate three Do 17s lost in June, a further nine lost in July, nine in August, a single Dornier destroyed on the ground in September, three Do 17s in October, for a total of 24 lost in aerial combat and one on the ground. I./KG 2 lost 13 Do 17s destroyed and 12 damaged in 22 June – 31 October 1941. The Dornier's most notable action on the Eastern front occurred on 23–24 June at Grodno. The commander of the Soviet Western Front, General Dmitriy Pavlov attempted a counterattack against Hermann Hoth's Panzergruppe 3. With air superiority and no air opposition, Dornier Do 17s of III./KG 2 destroyed columns of Soviet infantry. With help from other units, the Luftwaffe destroyed 105 Soviet tanks. The Soviet 6th and 11th Mechanised Corps and 6th Cavalry Corps were routed. For his unit's particular effectiveness, Hauptmann Walter Bradel, received the Knight's Cross of the Iron Cross.

=== Western Europe ===
While I. and III./KG 2 were engaged on the Eastern Front, II./KG 2 operated from various bases in the Netherlands and France in Maritime Interdiction Operations and strategic bombing attacks on the United Kingdom. Its first notable action was its participation in Operation Donnerkeil, the Luftwaffe's air superiority plan in support of the Kriegsmarine operation Operation Cerberus (also known as the Channel Dash).

In July 1941 II. Gruppe were attached to Stab/KG 30 under the command of Luftflotte 3. On 2 July 1942 it could muster 37 Do 217s and 2 Do 17s. On the night of the 4/5 July 1942 it flew its first mission over the United Kingdom with Do 217s. Over the period 4 July – 31 December 1941 the unit lost 18 Do 217s. In August 1942 the unit lost 7 Do 217s during the Dieppe raid. In November 1942 it helped German forces occupy Vichy France during Case Anton. I./KG 2 returned to western Europe in May 1942. It engaged in night attacks over Britain and dropping naval mines in the English Channel and along the British east coast. This action continued until May 1944. By that time the Gruppe had struck at ports along the southern British coast which contained the Allied invasion fleets that were to launch the Normandy landings on 6 June 1944. II./KG 2 had supported I./KG 2 from December 1942 – September 1943. It was withdrawn to Germany owing to "very heavy losses". During that time, the Geschwaderkommodore Walter Bradel was killed returning from a raid on Norwich on 5 May 1943.

V./KG 2 was formed in mid 1943 and was the first to operate the Messerschmitt Me 410 in a night bomber and occasional night intruder role over the UK. The gruppe lost its first Me 410 on the night of 13–14 July 1943 when Fw Zwissler and his Bordfunker were killed after being shot down by future 'ace' F/L N Bunting in a Mosquito night fighter of No. 85 Squadron.

II./KG 2 converted to the Junkers Ju 188 in October – December 1943. It used its new aircraft to bomb British cities and ports containing the Allied invasion fleets. II./KG 2 continued strategic and anti-shipping strikes until, owing to lack of resources, was dissolved at Reppen on 3 October 1944. During its air raids over Britain, KG 2 lost 65 of 88 crews in April – September 1942. On four raids (27–31 July) it lost 27 aircraft.

III./KG 2 was withdrawn to Germany in July 1944 after combat operations over the Normandy beachheads. It was ordered dissolved on 16 September 1944, but it was not carried out. In October the Gruppe retrained as a night fighter unit flying the Dornier Do 335. The unit was renamed V./NJG 2 on 1 December 1944. Such training was abandoned in March 1945. I./KG 2 was disbanded officially on 3 October 1944 after combat operations over France.

== Commanding officers ==
Known as Kampfgeschwader 153 until 31 October 1938 and Kampfgeschwader 252 until 30 April 1939

• Oberst Walter Sommé	1 April 1936	–	31 October 1938
• Oberst Johannes Fink	1 November 1938	–	30 April 1939
• Generalmajor Johannes Fink	1 May 1939	–	20 October 1940
• Oberst Oberst Herbert Rieckhoff	21 October 1940	–	12 October 1941
• Major Walter Bradel	23 January 1943	–	5 May 1943 †
• Oberstleutnant Karl Kessel	18 May 1943	–	February 1944
• Major Hanns Heise	25 February 1944	–	April 1944
• Oberstleutnant Rudolf Hallensleben	17 June 1944	–	19 September 1944 (Note: The above list has major contradictions with Ulf Balke's history of KG 2)
