= Karl Kessel =

German general and Knight's Cross recipient (1912–1997)

- Born: 1 June 1912; Mülheim, German Empire
- Died: 24 August 1997 (aged 85); Bonn, Germany
- Military career
- Allegiance: Nazi Germany; West Germany
- Branch: Luftwaffe; German Air Force
- Service years: 1945; 1956–70
- Rank: Generalmajor
- Commands: KG 2
- Conflicts: World War II
- Awards: Knight's Cross of the Iron Cross

Karl Kessel (1 June 1912 – 24 August 1997) was a German officer during World War II and a general in the armed forces of West Germany. He was a recipient of the Knight's Cross of the Iron Cross of Nazi Germany. Kessel joined the Bundeswehr in 1956 and retired in 1970 as a Generalmajor.

== Awards ==
- Knight's Cross of the Iron Cross on 23 January 1944 as Oberstleutnant and Geschwaderkommodore of Kampfgeschwader 2

Military offices
Preceded by Leutnant Otto-Wolfgang Bechtle	Gruppenkommandeur of IV./Kampfgeschwader 2; 19 September 1940 – 21 March 1941	Succeeded by Major Johannes Hübner
Preceded by Hauptmann Ketterer	Gruppenkommandeur of I./Kampfgeschwader 2; 16 June 1942 – 5 May 1943	Succeeded by Major Franz Schönberger
Preceded by Major Walter Bradel	Geschwaderkommodore of Kampfgeschwader 2; 18 May 1943 – February 1944	Succeeded by Major Hanns Heise
