= Erich Bloedorn =

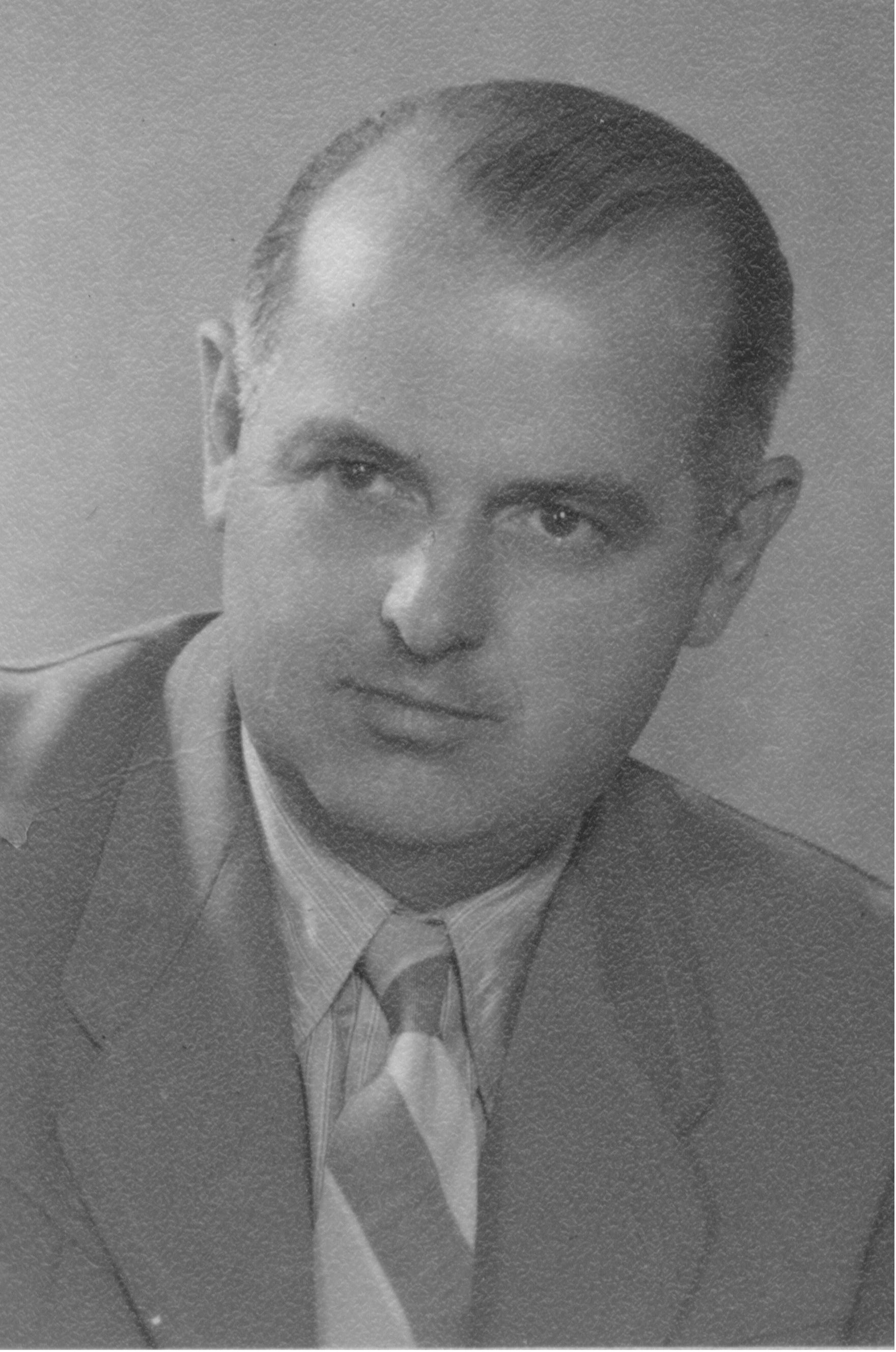
- Born: 6 July 1902; Mühlhausen
- Died: 30 November 1975 (aged 73); Ansbach
- Military career
- Allegiance: Weimar Republic (to 1930); Nazi Germany
- Branch: Reichswehr (1924–1930); Luftwaffe (1936–1945)
- Service years: 1924–1930; 1936–1945
- Rank: Oberst
- Units: Kampfgeschwader 4 Kampfgeschwader 30
- Commands: III./KG 4 KG 30
- Conflicts: World War II: Invasion of Poland; Battle of France; Battle of Britain; Operation Barbarossa; North African Campaign
- Awards: Knight's Cross of the Iron Cross
- Other work: Military advisor to China; Military advisor to Turkey

Erich Bloedorn (6 July 1902 – 30 November 1975) was a German Luftwaffe bomber pilot and recipient of the Knight's Cross of the Iron Cross during World War II.

== Life ==
Bloedorn studied at the University of Königsberg and became a member of the Corps Masovia in summer 1921. In 1924 he gave up studying and joined the Reichswehr in Allenstein, Masuria. When he was lieutenant in the de:2. (Preußisches) Infanterie-Regiment (Reichswehr) in Lötzen he made a bet: to reach Istanbul via Munich within 10 days, alone by motorcycle. He did and the German embassy gave a function.

He retired major from the Reichswehr in 1930 to serve on the General Staff of former Generaloberst Hans von Seeckt, who served as a military advisor to Chiang Kai-shek in Nanking and Shanghai. In 1936 Bloedorn joined the Luftwaffe and served as Hauptmann in Berlin. In 1940 he became Geschwaderkommodore of the Adler-Geschwader which flew air raids in France, the Netherlands, England, Scapa Flow and Norway and sank the Convoy PQ 17.

Having fought in the North African Campaign Bloedorn was promoted Oberstleutnant and assigned to Albert Kesselring in 1943. In Bucharest he witnessed the breakdown of the pro-German Romanian army and the coup of Michael I of Romania. As Oberst he returned to Kesselring until the end of the war. After the war Bloedorn built up a civil existence in publishing of scientific literature. He was married to Dr. med. Ursula Bloedorn. Their daughter Gisa is living in Ansbach, their son Arne in Rheine.

== Awards ==
- Flugzeugführerabzeichen
- Front Flying Clasp of the Luftwaffe
- Iron Cross (1939)
  - 2nd Class
  - 1st Class
- Knight's Cross of the Iron Cross on 13 October 1940 as Major and Gruppenkommandeur of the III./Kampfgeschwader 4 "General Wever"
- German Cross in Gold on 2 September 1942 as Major in Kampfgeschwader 30

Military offices
| Preceded by Major Neudörffer | Commander of III. Kampfgeschwader 4; 19 June 1940 – 3 February 1941 | Succeeded by Major Wolfgang Bühring |
| Preceded by Oberst Herbert Rieckhoff | Commander of Kampfgeschwader 30; October 1940 – 18 May 1943 | Succeeded by Oberstleutnant Wilhelm Kern |
