= Battle of the River Forth =

1939 air battle in Scotland during WWII

- Part of the Phoney War of World War II
Date	16 October 1939
Location	Rosyth Naval Base, Firth of Forth
Result	British victory

Belligerents
Germany	United Kingdom

Commanders and leaders
Hans Storp	George Pinkerton; Pat Glifford

Units involved
Kampfgeschwader 30; Kampfgeschwader 26	No. 602 Squadron RAF; No. 603 Squadron RAF

Strength
12 Junkers Ju 88; 3 Heinkel He 111	~11 Supermarine Spitfires; 2 light cruisers; 2 destroyers; 1 aircraft carrier

Casualties and losses
3 killed; 6 injured; 15 captured; 3 Junkers Ju 88	16 killed; 44 wounded

The Battle of the River Forth was an air battle on 16 October 1939 between Supermarine Spitfires from No. 602 and No. 603 Squadrons of the Royal Air Force and Junkers Ju 88 bombers of 1. Gruppe Kampfgeschwader 30. It resulted when twelve Ju 88s attacked Rosyth naval base at the Firth of Forth. The raid was the first German air raid on Britain during World War II.

== Background ==
When Britain declared war on Germany on 3 September 1939, some feared Germany would immediately embark on a devastating aerial bombing campaign against British cities. Adolf Hitler still hoped an all-out war with Britain might be avoided if a compromise could be reached. Britain, however, showed no inclination to compromise, and it was decided bombing should commence. Hitler remained anxious the attacks should not antagonise the British too much and so the rules of engagement were designed to avoid civilian casualties.

In its past, threats to Britain were always perceived as coming from the east, and for many years there had been major Royal Navy bases sited to allow its warships access to the North Sea, including Rosyth, on the northern shore of the Firth of Forth.

When war was declared on 3 September, the central belt of Scotland was protected by two fighter squadrons of the Auxiliary Air Force, which had been "embodied" or called up some weeks before. At Turnhouse (then a Fighter Command sector station) was No. 603 (City of Edinburgh) Squadron, equipped with Gloster Gladiators, and in the process of converting to Spitfires, its pilots only deemed competent to fly operationally in daylight. A Spitfire squadron, No. 602 (City of Glasgow), was based at Abbotsinch.

To counter the German threat from the east, 602 Squadron was moved to bolster the defences around the Firth of Forth. On 7 October, it moved to Grangemouth, and on 13 October to RAF Drem, nearer the coast.

== Air raid-16 October 1939 ==
=== Morning ===
16 October 1939 started with relatively good weather for the time of year and 6 or 7 tenths broken cloud. At 09:20, the Chain Home RDF station at Drone Hill near Coldingham detected two intruders heading for the coast from the North Sea. These were Heinkel He 111s of Kampfgeschwader 26 (KG26), based at airfield at Westerland on Sylt, at that time, the nearest Luftwaffe base to Britain.

The Heinkels were fitted with cameras and they carried out tactical reconnaissance sorties. The German crews knew Spitfires were based in the Firth of Forth, even if officially, Intelligence said there were none.

After being detected by RDF, at 09:45, Royal Observer Corps reports placed one unidentified aircraft at high altitude on a southwesterly course over Dunfermline heading for Rosyth, with another flying across the Borders near Galashiels. Three minutes later, at 09:48, Blue Section of 602 Squadron (three Spitfires led by Flight Lieutenant George Pinkerton ) was scrambled to patrol the Isle of May at 5,000 ft (1,500 m).

At 10:08, one He 111 was spotted by lookouts aboard the cruiser HMS Edinburgh, at anchor in the estuary. Shortly afterwards, the bomber was observed over Drem. Blue Section patrolled over the Island of May for 20 minutes before being ordered by the Turnhouse operations room to move south towards Dunbar. Pinkerton spotted the Heinkel and at 10:21 ordered his section into line astern to make a No 1 attack on the enemy bomber. However, the Germans made a sharp turn to port to escape into clouds. Still some distance away, Pinkerton and one of his other pilots, Archie McKellar, fired at the fleeing enemy, doing no damage. The bomber landed safely at Sylt.

These were the first shots fired in the air war over Britain.

Blue Section returned to Drem at 10:44.

Over the course of the rest of the morning, Spitfires from 602 Squadron continued to be scrambled to try, unsuccessfully, to intercept unknown intruders, to no effect. By lunchtime, all aircraft were back on the ground with one of 602's sections at Coastal Command station Leuchars, just north of St Andrews. It had been vectored as far north as Peterhead and being low on fuel, decided to land there to refuel and have lunch.

Unknown to the RAF, the German aircraft had radioed information about the weather conditions over the Forth and, crucially, the ships they had observed (which they believed included the battlecruiser Hood). At Westerland, 12 bombers waited to learn whether conditions would allow them to mount an attack, the first on the British homeland.

=== Afternoon ===
In addition to KG 26, there was another unit at Westerland, Kampgeschgwader 30 (KG30), flying the new Junkers Ju 88A-1.

The commanding officer of KG30 was Hauptmann Helmuth Pohle, who would lead the attack, twelve Ju 88s in four groups of three. The second group, led by Oberleutnant Hans Storp, KG30's second in command, planned to cross the North Sea at 23,000 ft (7,000 m) and make landfall at Berwick-upon-Tweed, then fly west across the Scottish border before turning north, to carry out their attack from the west. Each aircraft carried two 500 kg (1,100 lb) bombs – less than the maximum payload because of fuel needed for the distance they would need to cover.

The first group took off at 11:55. At 12:25, the approaching aircraft were spotted by RDF stations. During the crossing of the North Sea, Pohle's group had drifted north and made landfall about 20 mi (32 km) from Berwick, not far from Dunbar. Instead of turning back on to their intended track, Pohle decided to fly directly to the target, taking his bombers across East Lothian south of the airfield at Drem, then over the Firth of Forth. Pohle descended to 12,000 ft (3,700 m) to commence the first attack. The weather over the area was good: clear skies with broken clouds at 4,000 ft (1,200 m).

Below them, they could see several ships on the surface just beside the bridge but to their disappointment, what they thought to be Hood was not there. In fact, the ship previously sighted was Repulse, which resembled Hood. Repulse was safely in the Rosyth dockyard and, in accordance with the instructions received by the Germans, no longer a legitimate target. Anchored in the target area were two Town-class light cruisers, Edinburgh and Southampton. The Tribal-class destroyer Mohawk was making for the dockyard. Other British ships in the vicinity was another destroyer, Jervis, and the aircraft carrier Furious.

A few minutes after the first group of Ju 88s crossed the British shoreline, the second made landfall as planned, crossing the border north of Lauder and shortly reaching Gladhouse Reservoir. From here, there was a clear view of the estuary. At 14:20, the Observer Corps reported enemy aircraft over East Lothian and shortly afterwards, Turnhouse ordered 602 Squadron's Blue Section to scramble from Drem and investigate two unidentified aircraft over Tranent.

At 14:27, an anti-aircraft battery situated in Dalmeny Park reported three enemy aircraft flying up the Firth at 10,000 ft (3,000 m).

At 14:30, Pinkerton, having found nothing over Tranent, was ordered to fly north to patrol over the Firth. At the same time, Spitfires of 603 Squadron's Red Section (led by Flight Lieutenant Pat Gifford) were scrambled, with orders to head east, towards East Lothian.

Shortly before this, the first three Ju 88s were overhead the area of the bridge at 12,000 ft (3,700 m). Pohle could see the ship he thought to be Hood was in the confines of the dockyard. Turning his attention to the ships on the open water, he picked out one of the anchored cruisers, which he identified as Southampton, as his target and tipped into an 80º dive. As the aircraft dived, the top part of the cockpit canopy broke, taking the rear-facing machine gun with it. Despite this, Pohle continued his attack, releasing his bombs at 1,800 ft (550 m). According to Pohle, turned towards the north bank of the estuary, where he planned to orbit and observe the second wave's attack.

Meantime, Storp's group arrived, commencing their attack at 14:38. As planned, they had flown across the borders before heading northwards south of Roslin and over Threipmuir Reservoir in the Pentland Hills almost due south of the target area and the airfield at Turnhouse. Yellow Section of 603 Squadron (led by Flight Lieutenant George Denholm) had taken off at 14:35 and were climbing to altitude to intercept. Storp descended to 12,000 ft (3,700 m) and decided to attack the ships beside the bridge. As the Ju 88 dived, he selected one of the cruisers as his target and at 2,400 ft (730 m) released his bombs. He believed his target was Southampton.

Storp was sure his bombs had hit the target and, along with the two other Ju 88s of the second group, turned south hoping to fly the reciprocal route back to the North Sea.

As Storp's group tried to make their exit south, Pohle was orbiting low over Inverkeithing, 603 Squadron's Red Section positioned over Midlothian, 602 Squadron's Blue Section patrolling over the northern part of the estuary, and 603 Squadron's Yellow Section was climbing to altitude from Turnhouse.

One of Yellow Section's pilots, 'Black' Morton, saw three Ju 88s to the north. This was probably the third group which was next to attack, but more immediately, at about 3,000 ft (910 m) and south of the airfield, were another three Ju 88s – Storp's group, trying to escape. Yellow Section's Spitfires engaged the enemy individually.

The port engine of Storp's aircraft was rendered useless by bullets from the Spitfires, and one of the gunners, Obergefreiter Kramer, was killed. Storp's aircraft was harried by Spitfires and he knew he would not reach the North Sea. The fight continued over the Pentland Hills to the south of Edinburgh. Since his aircraft was a type unknown to the RAF, Storp hoped to keeping out of enemy hands and decided to try to ditch in the estuary.

While this was taking place, 603 Squadron's Red Section was ordered to return west. Suddenly, they saw Storp's damaged Ju 88 limping along towards the sea and cut in behind it, taking turns firing at it. They had not appreciated it was already being pursued by Yellow Section, which was not a little upset to be 'cut out' by their colleagues. The Ju 88 crashed into the sea off Prestonpans, the coup de grace delivered by F/L Gifford, who timed his attack as 14:45.

A small fishing boat, Dayspring, was not far from the crash site. Her captain, John Dickson, immediately picked up three injured German airmen. Kramer went down with the aeroplane. The Germans were returned to Cockenzie and delivered to local police.

603 Squadron's Red Section returned to Turnhouse.

When Storp's group completed their attack, Pohle, still orbiting over Inverkeithing, turned eastwards, making for the North Sea. He was intercepted by 602 Squadron's Blue Section (F/L Pinkerton and Flying Officers McKellar and Paul Webb). Pinkerton spotted Storp about 3 miles (4.8 km) ahead, above some cloud. Before he could attack, his attention was distracted by a group of three other aircraft, Sea Skuas on a training flight from RNAS Donibristle, one of a number of Fleet Air Arm airfields in the area. By the time Pinkerton's attention refocused on the enemy, Storp had disappeared into cloud and Webb had lost contact with his section mates.

Pinkerton spotted the fleeing Ju 88s through a patch of cloud and he and McKellar pursued it into clear skies further east. Two of his crewmen were killed in the attack, with the third badly injured. The attacks also rendered the engines useless and Pohle had no option but to ditch his aircraft off Crail. As with Storp, there was a boat nearby which picked up the injured pilot and his gunner, who died the following day, leaving Pohle the sole survivor of his crew.

The exact time Pohle's aircraft ditched is unclear, but the Observer Corps logged the sound of firing at 14:43 in the general area of Elie, another small fishing village to the west of Crail. In his log book, Pinkerton noted the attack was carried out at 14:45/55 and they landed at 15:00.

There were still two waves of Ju 88s approaching.

At 14:15, the third wave was reported to be crossing the coast at Dunbar. They continued flying west but eventually turned south towards the market town of Haddington. At the same time, six Spitfires of 603 Squadron's 'B' Flight were scrambled with orders to head east and patrol over North Berwick.

Three of 602 Squadron's Spitfires had landed at RAF Leuchars to refuel. As they waited, several aircraft were spotted but were assumed to be Bristol Blenheims, which resembled the Ju 88. The mistake was quickly corrected and it seems these were the three Ju 88s of the fourth wave which had crossed the coast considerably further north than their planned landfall at Berwick.

Thereafter, a series of running encounters took place for the rest of the afternoon. At 15:20, a Ju 88 was noticed over the Firth and at 15:25, Mohawk was near missed, bombs landing close enough to spray her with splinters, killing 13 ratings and two officers.

At 15.30, two Spitfires, one from 602 and one from 603, found and pursued a Ju 88 over the Island of May. One of 603's pilots, Pilot Officer 'Robbie' Robertson had taken off on his second sortie of the day at 15:40. North of Turnhouse and flying low – about 300 ft (91 m) – he found a Ju 88 on a southerly heading directly across 603 Squadron's base. Anti-aircraft gunners held their fire for fear of damaging Robertson's Spitfire but at 16:00, 'Black' Morton, on his own initiative, took off in pursuit. The Ju 88 turned east, taking it across the centre of Edinburgh at low level, pursued by Robertson, while Morton made for Leith and Portobello, hoping to cut it off. Flying at low level across the city, Robertson held off from firing at the Ju 88 in case his rounds caused damage or injury on the ground.

Eventually, the two Spitfires met up over Portobello and engaged the Ju 88. Stray rounds did cause damage to property and a painter was hit in the stomach but recovered.

Skirmishes continued but effectively the action was over.

== Aftermath ==
At the time, Luftwaffe recorded loss of two aircraft, the RAF none; Fighter Command considered it a victory. After the war, it was discovered a third Ju 88 had been badly damaged and limped to the Netherlands, where it made a forced landing in which all the crew were killed. It is unknown how this aircraft was damaged, whether by Spitfires or by anti-aircraft fire.

The two German aircraft shot down into the water were the first brought down in an attack against the British homeland.

It is generally accepted the Ju 88 flown by Hans Storp and brought down by 603 Squadron was the first, although many would disagree, claiming the aircraft flown by Helmut Pohle and brought down by 602 Squadron was first. An examination of reported timings suggests 603's was first.

While Gifford and Pinkerton were credited with the destruction of these aircraft, others were involved. The other airmen did not receive any official recognition for this.

Both intruders were destroyed by Auxiliaries (reservists), which raised the profile of the Auxiliary Air Force and confirmed the contention that they were just as effective as a regular squadron.

Because this was the first occasion that the Luftwaffe had attempted an attack, it was the subject of great interest both in the UK and abroad. The RAF examined carefully the workings of the various systems employed.

While the battle was notable for the successes of the British airmen, the Luftwaffe was not without success. It caused significant damage to some of the ships although none was sunk. Sixteen Royal Navy sailors died and 44 were injured. Mohawk received significant damage but managed to limp into the Rosyth base, her captain succumbing to his wounds once his ship was safe.

The German airmen who were captured were treated with courtesy and respect and their injuries attended to. Ultimately they finished up as prisoners of war in Canada. Those who had been killed and whose bodies were recovered were buried with full military honours.

Gifford and Pinkerton both received Distinguished Flying Crosses for their achievements.

The air battle over the waters of the Firth of Forth on 16 October 1939 was the first Luftwaffe attack on the British mainland, the first occasion in World War II of enemy aircraft intruding into British airspace being fired at by the RAF, and the first occasion enemy aircraft were shot down in British airspace during the war.

It is sometimes said that the aircraft carrying out the attacks on 16 October 1939 were Heinkel 111s. Some passengers on a train crossing the Forth Bridge at the time of the attack believed that the bridge was a target. A Heinkel He 111 was brought down at Humbie on 28 October 1939 by Spitfires of 602 Squadron and 602 Squadron in a separate incident, claimed to be the first German aircraft shot down on British soil by the RAF.
