= Golden Comb (tactic) =

Anti-ship military aviation tactic

The Golden Comb (German: die Goldene Zange) was an anti-ship tactic developed by the Luftwaffe during the Second World War for use against Allied convoys taking supplies to the Soviet Union by the Arctic route. It was first employed against Convoy PQ 18 in September 1942.

== Background ==
Before 1942 the Luftwaffe lacked a means to attack ships at sea due to the inter-service rivalry between the Luftwaffe, which regarded all air operations as its domain and the German navy (Kriegsmarine), which saw the development, production and use of torpedoes as naval matter. Germany had no torpedo bomber force, in contrast to the forces of other world powers, even the other Axis nations like Italy with the land-based Aerosiluranti or the Imperial Japanese Navy Air Service which used the Type 91 torpedo in the attack on Pearl Harbor, having revealed its manufacturing details to Germany in early August 1942.

In early 1942, when the Allied Arctic convoy cycle was becoming well established, the Luftwaffe was ordered to form a torpedo bomber force. Two Gruppen, III/Kampfgeschwader 26 (III/KG 26) and III/Kampfgeschwader 30 (III/KG 30), were assigned to train and equip as anti-ship /anti-convoy units, with Heinkel He 111 and Junkers Ju 88 bombers, modified to carry two air-dropped torpedoes under the wings.

To attack a convoy, a formation of 20 to 30 ships sailing in close formation at relatively slow speed, the commander of KG 26 Generalmajor Martin Harlinghausen and his units developed the Goldene Zange (Golden Comb) anti-shipping tactic. The attack was planned for use in the half light period of dawn or dusk and would be in conjunction with a simultaneous dive bombing attack to divide opposing anti-aircraft fire.

The Goldene Zange tactic involved the Gruppe forming line abreast, about forty aircraft flying approximately 30 m (33 yd) apart and approaching the convoy from a forward quarter, simultaneously to launch their torpedoes at a distance of 1,000 m (1,094 yd) then overfly the convoy and escape in the confusion. The tracks of up to eighty torpedoes heading towards the target was likened to the teeth of a comb.

== In action ==
The first use of the Goldene Zange occurred on 13 September 1942 against the Allied convoy PQ 18, a collection of 35 merchant ships, with a strong escort of 18 warships including the escort carrier HMS Avenger. After a dive-bombing attack by I/KG 30, the convoy was approached by the torpedo-bombers, I/KG 26, in a formation of 42 aircraft. The sight was described by one observer as "a huge flight of nightmare locusts". Despite anti-aircraft fire from the ships and their escorts, the group continued on course, dropping their torpedoes as planned. The convoy commodore ordered a turn to starboard to sail parallel to the torpedo tracks. In the confusion the signal was misread by the ships of the starboard columns, which continued ahead. Eight ships, six in the outermost starboard column and two further in, were sunk. This occasion was the most successful use of the Goldene Zange. The Luftwaffe aircraft made more attacks on PQ 18 after the torpedo attack and two more ships were sunk but no successes similar to the first day were achieved. Aircraft losses mounted after the first attack and by the end of the air offensive against PQ 18, forty aircraft from the two groups had been lost. Following PQ 18, Arctic convoys were suspended until December 1942 when the next series of convoys was able to travel under cover of the Arctic night.

== Aftermath ==
Devastating as the Goldene Zange had proved against PQ 18, the Allies quickly found counter-measures which reduced its effectiveness and inflicted crippling losses on the attackers. The approaching formation was unable to take evasive action and was vulnerable to AA fire from the ships and escorts and attacks by fighter aircraft from the carrier. The combination of gun and fighter attack, aided by the bold and aggressive handling of Avenger and the AA ship, Ulster Queen, caused the bombers to release and break formation earlier and earlier in their approach runs as the battle progressed.

Combing the tracks (turning into the track of torpedoes to present a smaller target) was made more effective against torpedoes running in the same direction. The confusion over signals that contributed to the ship losses in PQ 18 during the first Goldene Zange attack was not repeated. Other air forces had found torpedo attacks were more effective against ships when delivered from different directions simultaneously. Whilst hitting eight ships in one attack was a huge success, it had taken over eighty torpedoes, ten for every hit, an inferior performance to the British attack on Bismarck (May 1941), the Imperial Japanese Navy attack on HMS Prince of Wales and Repulse (December 1941), and the United States Navy attack on Yamato (April 1945).
