= Herbert Rieckhoff =

German general

- Born: 25 December 1898
- Died: 30 November 1948 (aged 49)
- Military career
- Allegiance: Nazi Germany
- Branch: Luftwaffe
- Rank: Generalleutnant
- Commands: Kampfgeschwader 30; Kampfgeschwader 2
- Conflicts: World War I World War II
- Awards: Knight's Cross of the Iron Cross

Herbert Rieckhoff (25 December 1898 – 30 November 1948) was a German general during World War II. He was a recipient of the Knight's Cross of the Iron Cross of Nazi Germany.

== Awards and decorations ==
- Knight's Cross of the Iron Cross on 5 July 1941 as Oberst and Geschwaderkommodore of Kampfgeschwader 2
- German Cross in Gold on 27 July 1943 as Oberst im Generalstab (in the General Staff) of Luftflotte 1

Military offices
Preceded by Oberstleutnant Walter Loebel	Commander of Kampfgeschwader 30; 17 August 1940 – 20 October 1940	Succeeded by Oberstleutnant Erich Bloedorn
Preceded by Generalmajor Johannes Fink	Commander of Kampfgeschwader 2; 21 October 1940 – 12 October 1941	Succeeded by Oberst Karl Mehnert
Preceded by Generalmajor Heinz-Hellmuth von Wühlisch	Chief of Staff of Luftflotte 1; 12 October 1941 – 23 February 1943	Succeeded by Generalmajor Hans Detlef Herhudt von Rohden
