= Kampfgeschwader 30 =

Military unit of Nazi Germany

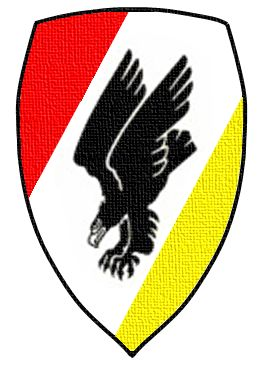
- Active: 1939–45
- Country: Nazi Germany
- Branch: Luftwaffe
- Type: Bomber wing
- Role: Tactical and Direct Ground Support.
- Size: Air force wing
- Nickname: Adler (eagle)
- Engagements: World War II

Insignia
- Identification symbol: Geschwaderkennung of 4D

Kampfgeschwader 30 (KG 30) was a Luftwaffe bomber wing during World War II.

== Service history ==
Formed on 15 November 1939 in Greifswald. I Gruppe formed 1 September, II Gruppe on 23 September and III Gruppe on 1 January 1940, based in Greifswald then Barth. IV Gruppe was formed 27 Oct 1940 as Erg.Sta./KG 30, and in April 1941 was increased to Gruppe strength. KG 30 was equipped with the Junkers Ju 88 and was initially trained as an anti-shipping and maritime attack unit: at the start of October 1939 it was attached to X. Fliegerkorps. On 16 October 1939 it attacked naval ships anchored off Rosyth Dockyard in the Firth of Forth.

II./KG 30 operated under X. Fliegerkorps for Operation Weserübung, the invasion of Norway. The unit Ju 88s engaged Allied shipping as its main target. On 9 April 1940, in cooperation with high-level bombing Heinkel He 111s of KG 26, Ju 88s of II./KG 30 dive-bombed and damaged the battleship HMS Rodney and sank the destroyer HMS Gurkha. The unit lost four Ju 88s in the action, the highest single loss of KG 30 throughout the campaign.

On 9 June 1940 Kampfgeschwader 30 took over Chièvres Air Base. On 17 June 1940 bombers from II./KG 30 sank RMS Lancastria off St Nazaire as she evacuated troops during Operation Aerial, killing some 5,800 Allied personnel. On 15 October 1940 III./KG 30 was redesignated Ergänzungskampfgruppe 6 and a new III./KG 30 was formed in Amsterdam-Schiphol from III./KG 4.

In September 1942 KG 30 was active against Arctic convoy PQ 18. Attacking PQ 18, the group carried out a massed torpedo attack known as the Golden Comb, developed as an anti-convoy measure. This was initially successful, sinking several ships, though the group suffered heavy losses. On 23 November 1944 Kampfgeschwader 30 was redesignated as Kampfgeschwader(J)30, converting to a fighter unit. The unit was disbanded 18 April 1945.

== Commanding officers ==
- Oberstleutnant Walter Loebel, 15 November 1939 – 16 August 1940
- Oberst Herbert Rieckhoff, 17 August – 20 October 1940
- Oberstleutnant Erich Bloedorn, October 1940 – May 1943
- Oberstleutnant Wilhelm Kern, 18 May – 10 September 1943
- Oberstleutnant Sigmund-Ulrich Freiherr von Gravenreuth, September 1943 – 16 October 1944
- Oberst Bernhard Jope, October 1944 – February 1945
- Oberst Hanns Heise, February – May 1945
