= Air raid on Ceylon (5 April 1942) =

WWII battle in Ceylon between Britain and Japan

- Part of the Indian Ocean raid of the Second World War
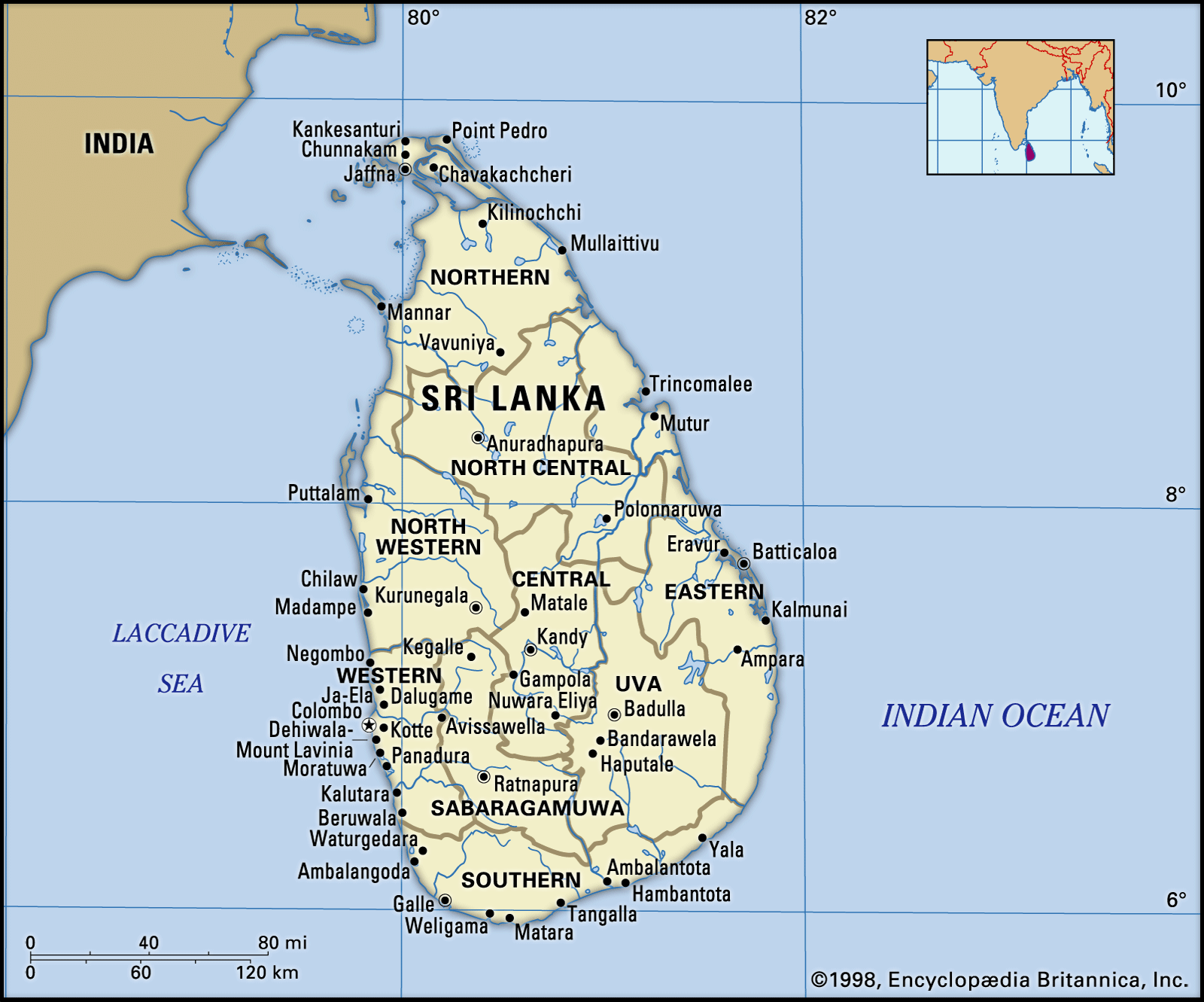
- Map of Ceylon (Sri Lanka)
Date	5 April 1942
Location	Colombo, British Ceylon 06°57′10″N 79°50′41″E
Result	Japanese victory

Belligerents
(Empire of Japan) Japan	United Kingdom; British Ceylon; Canada; Netherlands

Casualties and losses
7 aircraft	37 RN personnel killed; 23 merchant sailors killed; 37 civilians killed; 26 aircraft destroyed; 3 ships sunk; 3 ships damaged
- Colombo Harbour on the south-western coast of Sri Lanka

The Air raid on Ceylon (5 April 1942) also known as the Easter Sunday raid, was an air attack on Colombo, British Ceylon (now Sri Lanka) by Imperial Japanese Navy aircraft from the aircraft carriers of the 1st Air Fleet (Kidō Butai) during the Indian Ocean raid (31 March – 10 April 1942). The Japanese plan was to destroy the British Eastern Fleet in harbour.

The British received warning of the raid in March through decoded Japanese wireless messages and from air reconnaissance. The British forestalled the Japanese by dispersing shipping from the harbours in Ceylon before the attack. The Japanese aircraft were met by fighters of 222 Group, Royal Air Force, the Fleet Air Arm (FAA) of the Royal Navy and anti-aircraft guns.

Port facilities were damaged and ships in Colombo harbour were sunk or damaged. The bulk of the Eastern Fleet was not found and survived but several ships were sunk at sea after the raid. The Eastern Fleet moved temporarily to East Africa, from where it sent carrier forces into the central and eastern Indian Ocean. The Japanese Navy was unable to repeat the raid because of its commitments in the Pacific.

== Background ==
=== British Ceylon (Sri Lanka) ===
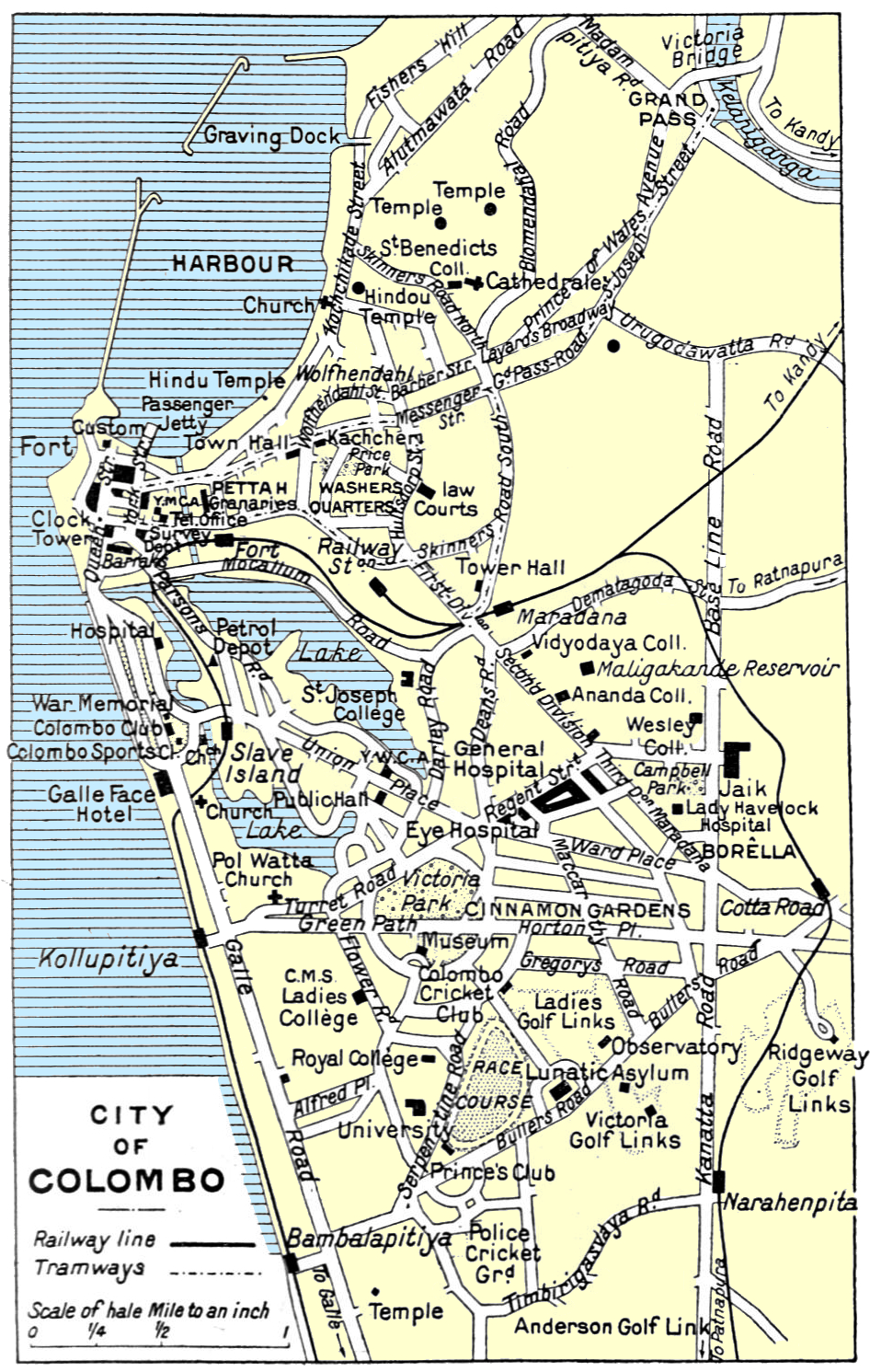
1930 diagram of Colombo and the harbour

Ceylon (now Sri Lanka) is off the south-east of India between shipping routes from Singapore and Rangoon to the Red Sea and the Persian Gulf. There are natural harbours at Colombo on the south-western coast and Trincomalee on the north-eastern coast, a naval anchorage and base. Ceylon was a geographically important part of the British Empire and its system of trade, communication and military organisation. In the 1930s more shipping tonnage was handled in Ceylon than all the ports of India. Since the beginning of the Second World War, the colonial government had engaged in mass recruitment for local defence, overseas labouring and expanded food production. Tea and rubber production was emphasised and rubber output rose from 99,500 long tons (101,100 t) in 1941 to 105,500 long tons (107,200 t) in 1943. The 3,600 workers in civil engineering converted to the repair and refitting of ships and the manufacture of dummy aircraft, guns and radar installations.

When the Pacific War began on 7 December 1941, the Allied disasters in the Pacific, Malaya and the British débâcle at the Battle of Singapore in February 1942 made Colombo Harbour the basis for eastern trade and the centre for the assembly of Indian Ocean convoys. Colombo port was large enough for 45 ships but soon had 100 to 110 ships at once, causing much overcrowding. The strategic importance of Ceylon increased and British planners deemed the island essential to the defence of India and Allied lines of communication through the Indian Ocean. The Allied defeat in the Dutch East Indies campaign (11 January – 9 March 1942) left the Indian Ocean vulnerable to Japanese attacks. The Malacca Strait in the Netherlands East Indies was about 1,000 nmi (1,900 km; 1,200 mi) east of Trincomalee, making it a useful base for attacks on Japanese ships sailing to Rangoon in Burma.

From September to December 1941, 710 troop reinforcements arrived on the island and from January to March 1942, another 2,612 arrived; during April and June, 2,112 more troops joined the garrison (2,872) and 4,993 troops moved between the Far East and Ceylon from October 1941 to March 1942. The extent of the disasters that befell the British in early 1942, led in March to Admiral Sir Geoffrey Layton being transferred from the temporary command of the Eastern Fleet and installed as the Commander-in-Chief, Ceylon, after Admiral James Somerville arrived to command the fleet. Layton was given authority over the military forces on the island and the civilian authorities of the governor, Sir Andrew Caldecott, "Do not ask permission to do things. Do them and report afterwards what you have done". Layton found the same complacency and inertia in Ceylon as he had experienced in Malaya,

...he takes complete charge of Ceylon and stands no nonsense from anyone.... He pulls all the Ministers legs... and they work for him all the harder.

— Admiral Somerville

=== Air defence ===
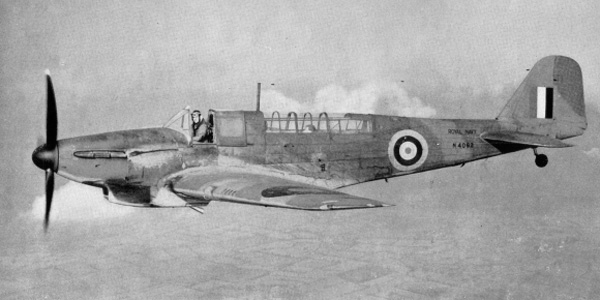
Example of a Fairey Fulmar Mk II

In September 1941 the Royal Air Force (RAF) had established No. 222 Group RAF (Air Vice-Marshal John D'Albiac) on the island in command of 273 Squadron at China Bay airfield with four Vickers Vildebeest and four Fairey Seal torpedo bombers. Until February 1942, the air defence of Ceylon had been a Royal Navy responsibility and 803 Naval Air Squadron (803 NAS) and 806 Naval Air Squadron (806 NAS) had transferred to Ceylon from the Middle East, six Fairey Fulmars at a time. Eight Hurricanes that had been assembled at Karachi, were flown to Ceylon, six of the Hurricanes, ferried to Ceylon by pilots of 136 Squadron, arrived at RAF Ratmalana on 23 February. The Torpedo Bomber Reconnaissance Pool, 788 Naval Air Squadron (788 NAS) with six Fairey Swordfish for the Eastern Fleet, was formed on 18 January at China Bay, near Trincomalee and was pressed into service in defence of Ceylon.

By March 1942, there were airfields at China Bay near Trincomalee, Ratmalana near Colombo, an airstrip was built at the Colombo Racecourse to relieve congestion at Ratmalana and another airstrip had been built at Minneriya on the south coast. China Bay was a grass landing ground that had the sea at both ends and there was a ridge along the southern edge; a low ridge ran along the northern boundary. Aircraft could only land and take off to the north-east or south-west, depending on the wind direction. There were fuel storage tanks beyond the north-east corner of the airfield at the Royal Naval Base Trincomalee. Anti-aircraft defence comprised four obsolescent QF 3-inch 20 cwt anti-aircraft guns at Trincomalee. The danger of an air attack by aircraft of the Japanese Navy aircraft carriers was acute after the examples of the Attack on Pearl Harbor in December 1941 and the Bombing of Darwin in February 1942. The airfields at Ratmalana, near Colombo and China Bay had been expanded. (Note: The Japanese were unaware of the bases at the Colombo Racecourse and Koggala.)

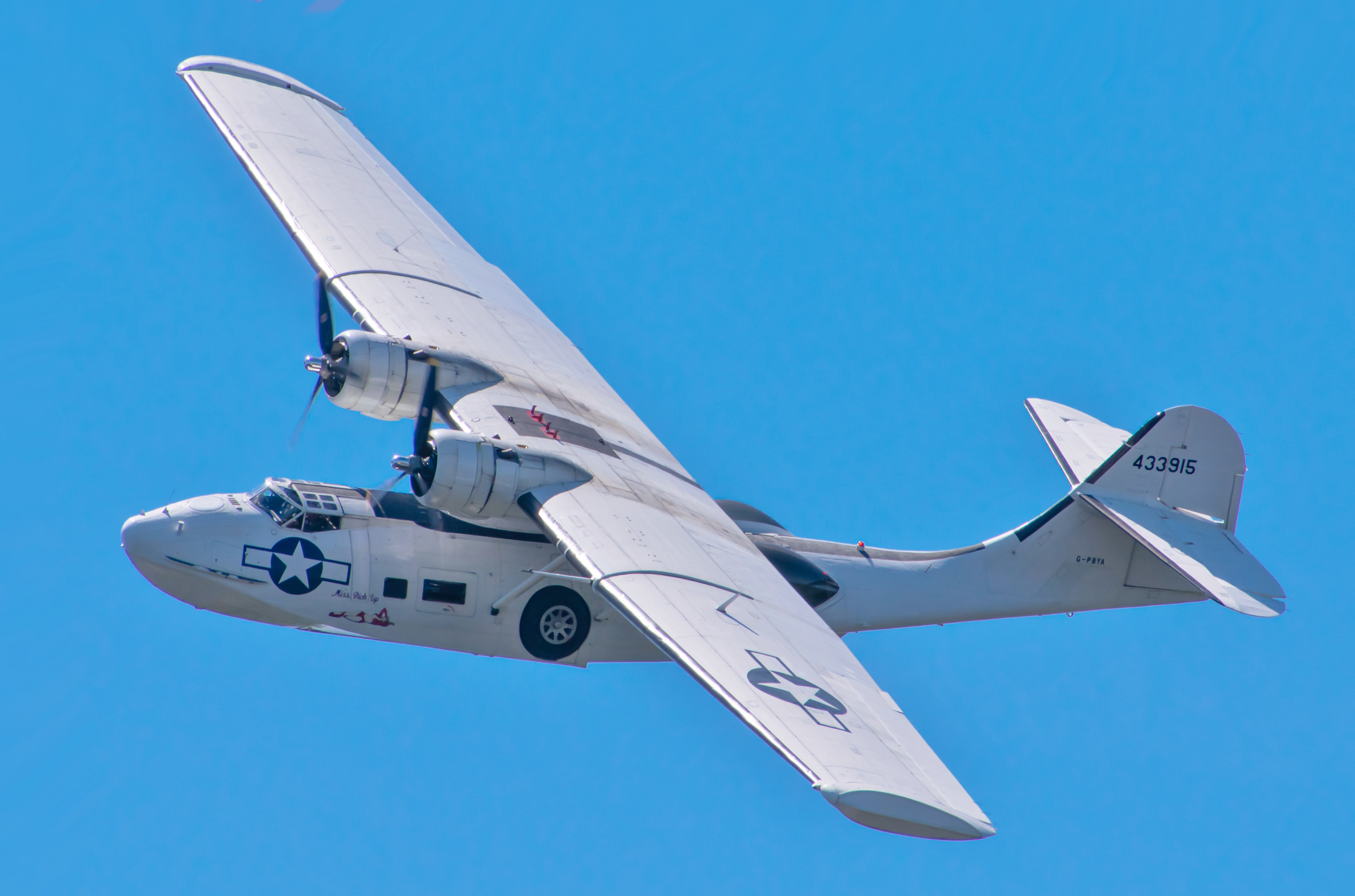
Example of a Catalina flying boat

On 6 and 7 March the aircraft carrier HMS Indomitable dispatched sixty Hurricanes of 30 Squadron and 261 Squadron, that had been intended for Java. On 30 March, the RAF reconstituted 258 Squadron that had been mauled in the fighting in British Malaya, Sumatra and Java. By 4 April, 803 NAS and 806 NAS of the Fleet Air Arm were ready with 24 Fulmars; the ground defences had been reinforced to 144 anti-aircraft guns. On 5 April, there were 37–38 serviceable Hurricanes near Colombo.

The first Consolidated PBY Catalina long-range flying boat of 413 Squadron Royal Canadian Air Force (RCAF) arrived on 28 March, with the ground crews following on by sea, two more arrived before the raid and on 6 and 7 April two more Canadian Catalinas arrived. By 4 April, four 205 Squadron RAF Catalinas had reached the island. There was one operational Dutch Catalina of the Netherlands Naval Aviation Service (MLD); two of the RAF and three Dutch Catalinas were unserviceable. The Catalinas were based at Koggala lagoon, at the south end of the island.

=== Radar ===
Radar stations, code-named Air Ministry Experimental Stations (AMES) were established at the Royal Colombo Golf Club at Ridgeway about 6 mi (9.7 km) north of Ratmalana airfield (AMES 254) and at Trincomalee (AMES 272). AMES 254 personnel arrived on 18 March and the equipment four days later. AMES 254 became operational on 25 March and was linked by telephone to 20 Operations Room on 28 March. The terrain around the radar limited maximum range to 60 mi (97 km) and the altitude of an object affected the detection range. The short notice may not have been sufficient for operators to tell the difference between false radar echoes produced by local conditions and real ones. The aerial projected "lobes" in which objects might be detected, with gaps between some lobes or lobes overlapping. The distance travelled by an aircraft between the maximum range of AMES 254 to Ratmalana was 54 mi (87 km) A Zero took about 17 minutes to cover the distance and it took a Hurricane five minutes to take off and six more to climb to interception altitude. There were only six minutes for AMES 254 to report to 20 Operations Room and for orders to be issued if pilots were going to avoid being caught climbing.

=== Japanese preparations ===
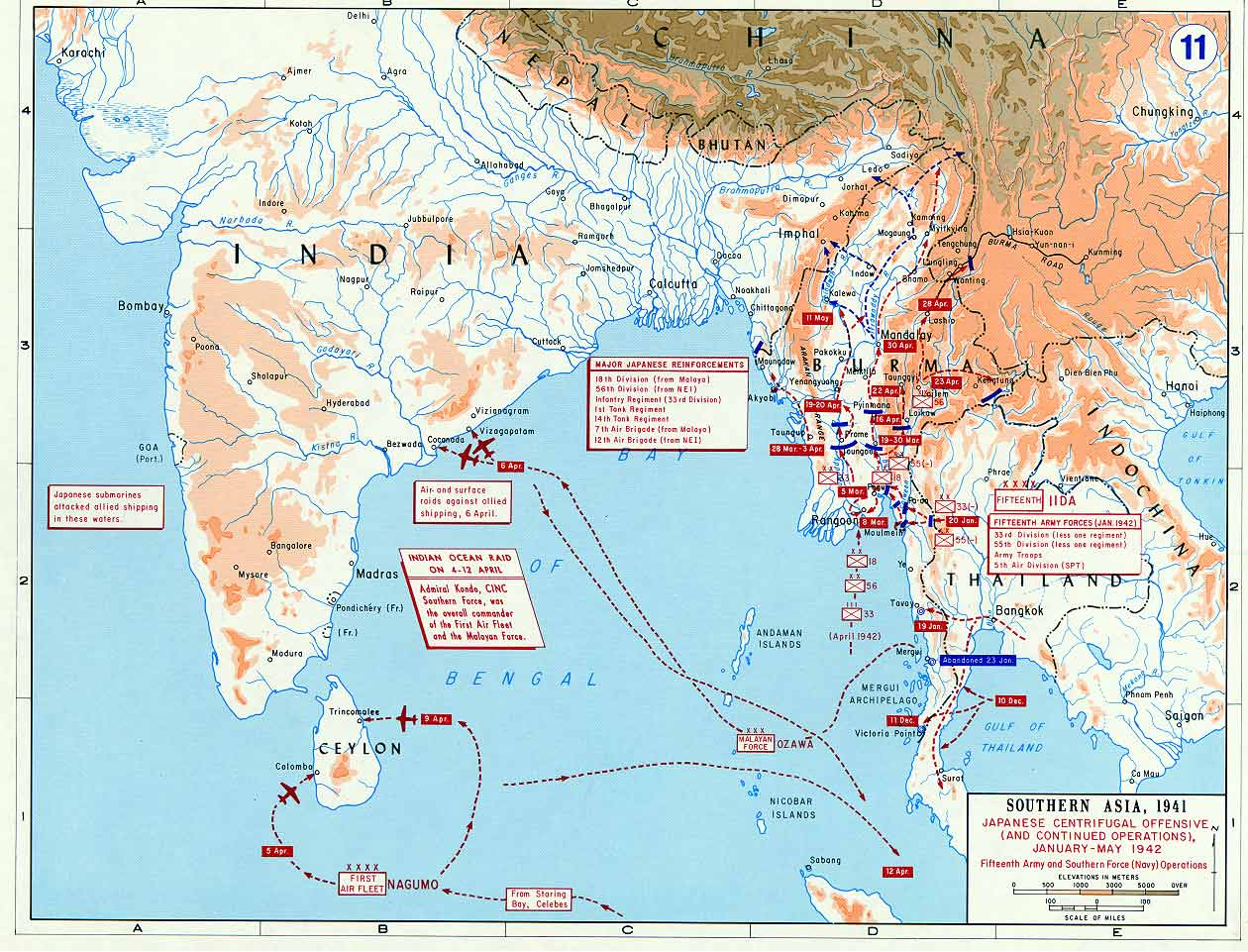
The Indian Ocean raid of the Japanese Combined Fleet (31 March to 10 April 1942)

On 9 March 1942 the Japanese Combined Fleet (Admiral Chūichi Nagumo) was ordered to protect Japanese sea communications from attack by the British army in Burma and to "sweep the Bay of Bengal clear of British naval units", ready for the occupation of the Andaman Islands and the Nicobar Islands in the eastern Indian Ocean. In February 1942, the Japanese army and navy conducted a war game to examine an invasion of Ceylon but both services were lukewarm. The army did not have the troops for an invasion and occupation; the navy was preoccupied with its operations in the Pacific.

There were insufficient ships to shift an invasion force and supply a garrison against attacks by British ships, submarines and aircraft. The Prime Minister, Hideki Tojo, rejected the plan indefinitely. By 16 March, the plan for an Indian Ocean raid was to depart from Staring Bay in the Celebes (now Sulawesi) in the Netherlands East Indies on 26 March, ready to attack Colombo on 5 April (C day). The Combined Fleet was based on the five aircraft carriers of the 1st Air Fleet, comprising Akagi of the 1st Carrier Squadron, Sōryū and Hiryū of the 2nd Carrier Squadron, with Shōkaku and Zuikaku of the 5th Carrier Squadron.

=== British code-breaking ===
On 4 December 1941 the Japanese had altered their code JN-25B that prevented British code-breakers of the Far East Combined Bureau (FECB) since 1936, a station of the Government Code and Cypher School (GC&CS) at Bletchley Park in England. from reading Japanese wireless messages. On 3 March 1942, the British began reading JN-25B messages again. By the middle of the month, decrypts revealed that the 1st Carrier Squadron and the 2nd Carrier Squadron were at Staring Bay in the Celebes, an Imperial Japanese Navy fuelling base and that the 5th Carrier Squadron was en route. Around 20 March decrypts revealed that a carrier force in Area D was going to attack DG on 2 April (C Day). On 28 March it was inferred that DG was Colombo. Japanese preparations were delayed by the late arrival of the 5th Carrier Squadron at Staring Bay on 24 March and the fleet sailed on 26 March.

The British air defences in Ceylon were alerted for an attack on 1 or 2 March and merchant shipping dispersed from Colombo. The Eastern Fleet sortied on 30 March to patrol 100 mi (160 km) south of the island. Aerial reconnaissance by Catalina flying-boats concentrated on the south-east, the right direction that the Japanese would approach but with no sightings, the Eastern Fleet retired late on 2 April toward Addu Atoll to refuel at Gan (Port T) about 600 mi (970 km) south-west of Ceylon. The heavy cruisers HMS Cornwall and Dorsetshire sailed for Colombo and HMS Hermes set out for Trincomalee to resume their commitments.

== Prelude ==
=== 2−4 April ===
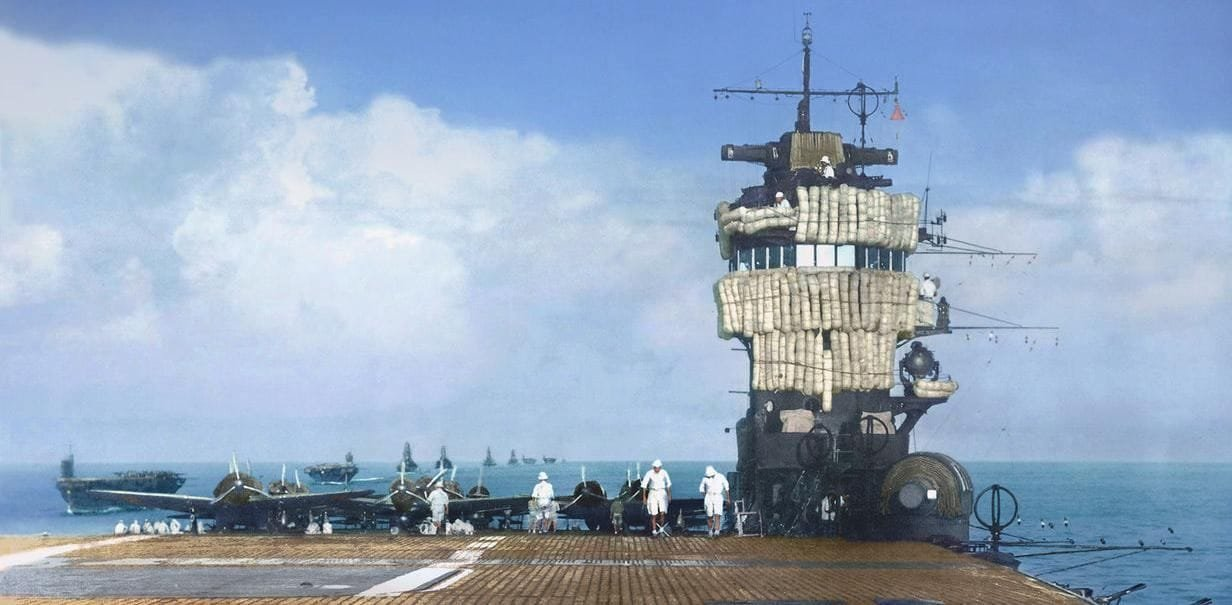
The deck of the Japanese aircraft carrier Akagi before the Indian Ocean raid

During the morning of 2 April, three Kawanishi H6K flying boats from Port Blair made a reconnaissance flight towards Ceylon and early on 4 April, an H6K was sent to Trincomalee, observing eight merchant ships and a destroyer in the harbour. The Japanese cancelled a planned reconnaissance of Colombo harbour on 4 April by cruiser floatplanes. Before dawn on 4 April, Catalina QL-A of 413 Squadron RCAF, flown by Squadron Leader Leonard Birchall, took off from Koggala to reconnoitre the southern-most patrol sector.

Later in the day, the crew decided to repeat a leg that took them to the southern-most point of their patrol. At 16:00, the crew spotted the Japanese fleet on the southern horizon, about 360 nmi (670 km; 410 mi) south-east of Ceylon. Three Zeros from Akagi, three from Zuikaku and six from Hiryū attacked the Catalina as it closed to get an accurate sighting. The radio was destroyed mid-transmission and only the sighting not the size of the fleet was received at Ceylon; several minutes after the Zeros attack began, QL-A was forced down on the sea.

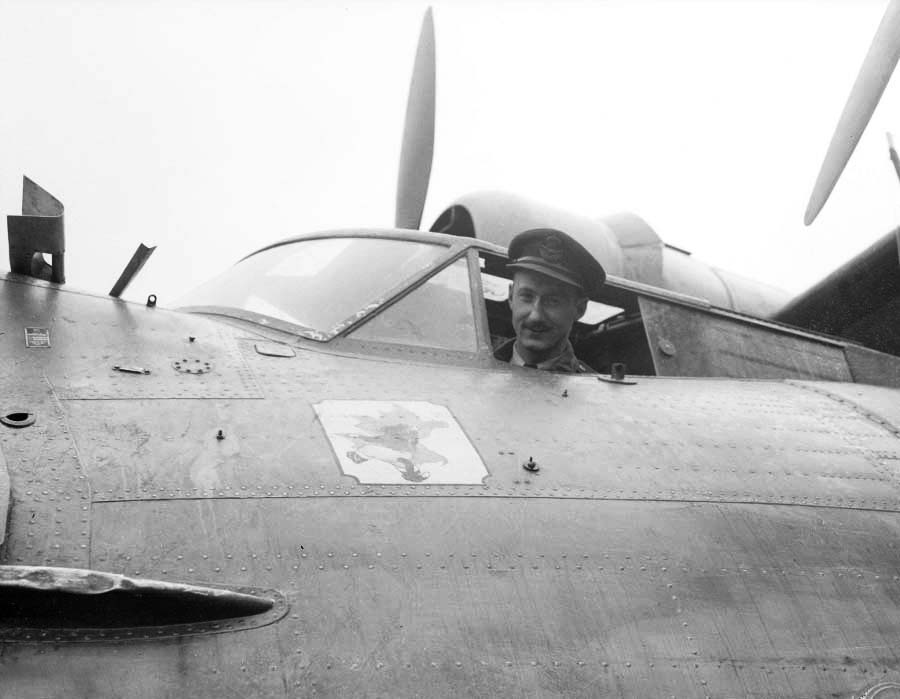
Squadron Leader Leonard Birchall RCAF, pilot of the Catalina that spotted the Japanese fleet

Zeroes strafed and sank the Catalina, the front gunner had been killed and two of the crew were shot in the water. The six survivors, including Birchall, were captured by the Japanese destroyer Isokaze. The prisoners claimed to have taken off from Colombo and this was reported to the fleet flagship Akagi late in the day; Koggala was not attacked during the raid. The prisoners denied making a sighting report but were confounded when the Japanese intercepted a signal from Colombo asking QL-A to repeat its report.

Catalina FV-R from 205 Squadron, flown by Flight Lieutenant "Jock" Graham, took off at 17:45. FV-R made reports at 22:37 of a destroyer at 01°59′N 82°20′E, course 315 degrees, speed 20 kn (37 km/h; 23 mph) and on 5 April at 00:45 reported six destroyers at 02°54′N 82°10′E, course 325 degrees, speed 21 kn (39 km/h; 24 mph) and at 06:15 a battleship, a cruiser "and at least four other ships" (Stuart 2014) 110 nmi (200 km; 130 mi), on a bearing of 195 degrees from Dondra Head, the southern tip of Ceylon. The Catalina was shot down by Japanese fighters about an hour and a half after making the report, with the loss of the crew.

== Attack on Colombo ==
=== 5 April ===
After the report from QL-A, D'Albiac briefed his staff for a Japanese air attack around dawn; 222 Group issued Operation Order No. 43 before midnight on 4 April,

Should the enemy force maintain present reported course at a speed of 25 knots it will arrive in position approximately 150 miles from Colombo at 2100 hours G.M.T. [Greenwich Mean Time].

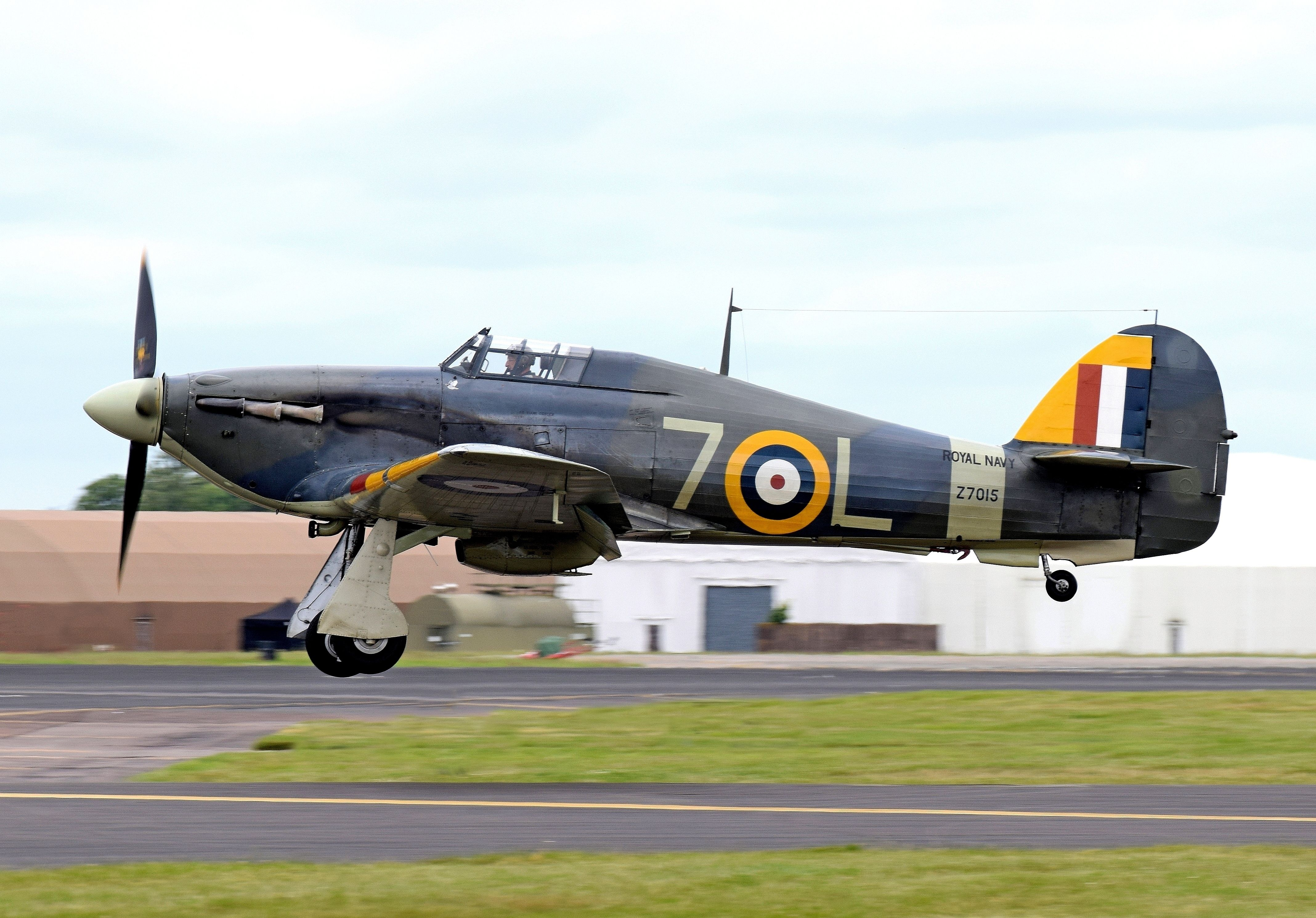
Example of a Sea Hurricane Mk.1b

At 04:00 on 5 April the RAF and FAA squadrons were put on stand-by with pilots at immediate readiness; 803 NAS scrambled six Fulmars from Ratmalana to patrol from Bentota, 35 mi (56 km) south of Colombo on the west coast, to Pottuvri 135 nmi (250 km; 155 mi) away on the south-east coast. The Navy ordered ships at Colombo and Trincomalee to scatter but at Colombo 21 merchant ships and 13 naval vessels were unable to sail due to defects and other reasons. Cornwall and Dorsetshire had departed from Colombo late on 4 April to rejoin the Eastern Fleet, part of which had started sailing back to Ceylon from Port T after the QL-A report.

At 05:34, Catalina BN-L of 240 Squadron, piloted by Flight Lieutenant W. Bradshaw, took off. At about 06:40, The crew saw six aircraft that looked like Fulmars at 5,000 ft (1,500 m) flying north in vic formation through scattered cloud, about 100 nmi (190 km; 120 mi) south of Ceylon. Four more aircraft, also flying north, were taken to be Sea Hurricanes. Since the aircraft were "British", Bradshaw kept radio silence. A Japanese aircraft had spotted BN-L at 06:38 and signalled soon afterwards "Sighted enemy plane. One flying boat at 346 degrees, 43 nmi [80 km (50 mi)] from launch point.(Stuart 2014)

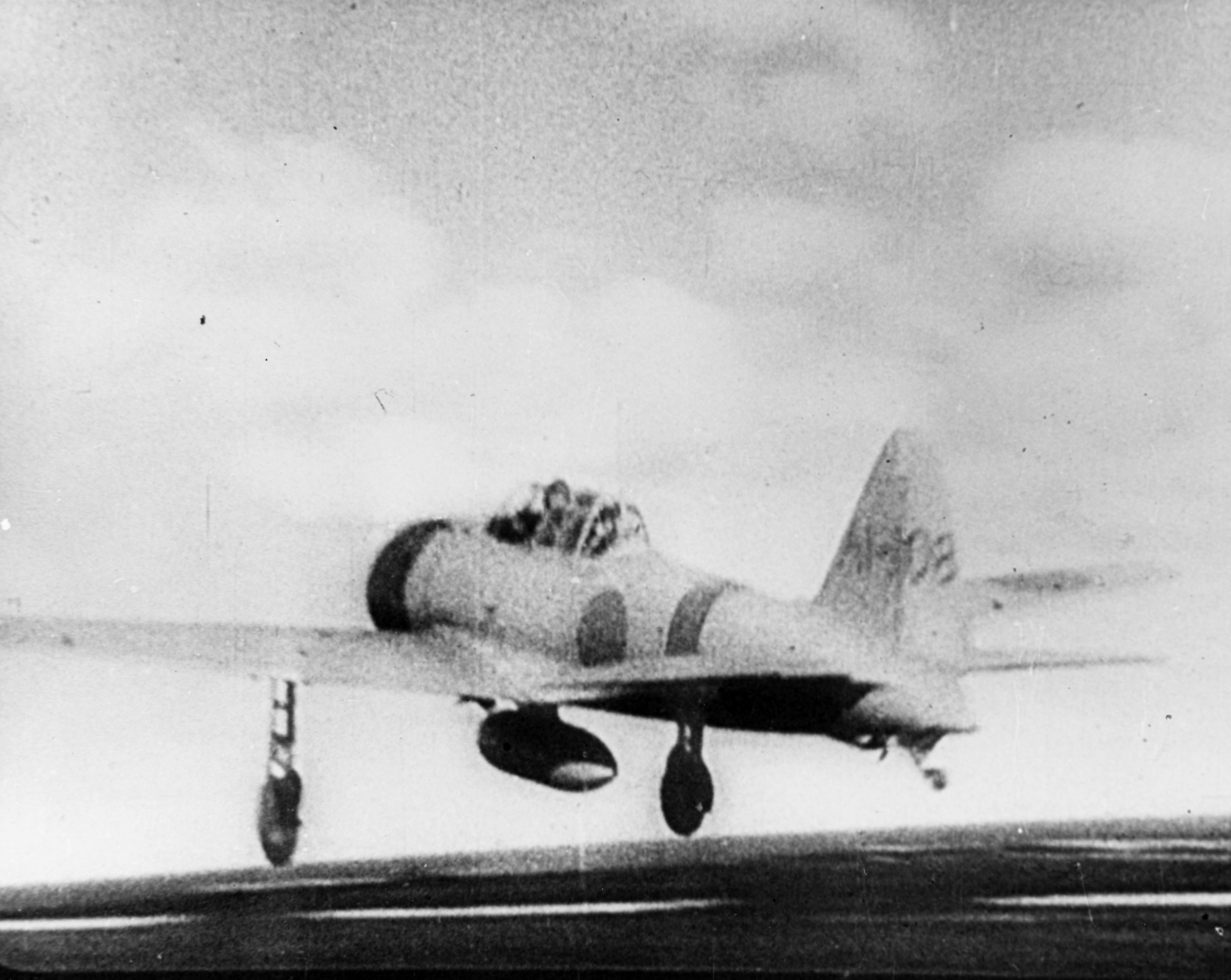
A Mitsubishi A6M Zero fighter taking off.

At 06:00 53 Kate bombers began to take off, 18 from Sōryū, 18 from Hiryū and 17 from Akagi, 120 nmi (220 km; 140 mi) from Colombo. Vals began to take off, 19 from Shōkaku and 19 from Zuikaku with 36 Zero fighter escorts forming a second wave. The Japanese aircraft approached Colombo from seaward, out of view of coast watchers and the 803 NAS line patrol. AMES 254 and its radar also failed to detect the Japanese force. British fighter pilots waited for a scramble that, due to the lack of early warning, never came, instead they were forced to take off during the attack, a tactical disadvantage when they needed height for the dive-and zoom tactic that could defeat the more manoeuvrable Zeros.

The first sign of a raid came at 07:32, when nine Zero fighters from Hiryū flew over the Colombo Racecourse airfield. The Zeros from Hiryū met six Swordfish of 788 NAS over Colombo, en route to Ratmalana, whose crews thought that the fighters were Hurricanes and fired the recognition signal (two greens). One pilot reported being attacked by "a Hurricane with a large red dot painted on the wings and fuselage"; the Six Swordfish were quickly shot down, the Zero pilots claiming eight aircraft. Five Hurricane Mk Ibs and nine Mk IIbs of 258 Squadron got off the ground undisturbed by 07:35 and climbed after the Zeros heading for the harbour. Three Fulmars each from 803 NAS and 806 NAS were scrambled from Ratmalana and the Racecourse. The 38 Vals from Shōkaku and Zuikaku were spotted from Ratmalana. The 14 Vals from Zuikaku attacked the airfield at 07:45 as Hurricanes from 30 Squadron were taking off in ones and twos; 21 got off the ground but four had not when the first bombs fell. The commanding officer's Hurricane was damaged and crashed on take-off. Pilots with no aircraft to fly armed themselves with Thompson submachine guns and joined in with the airfield Bofors gunners.

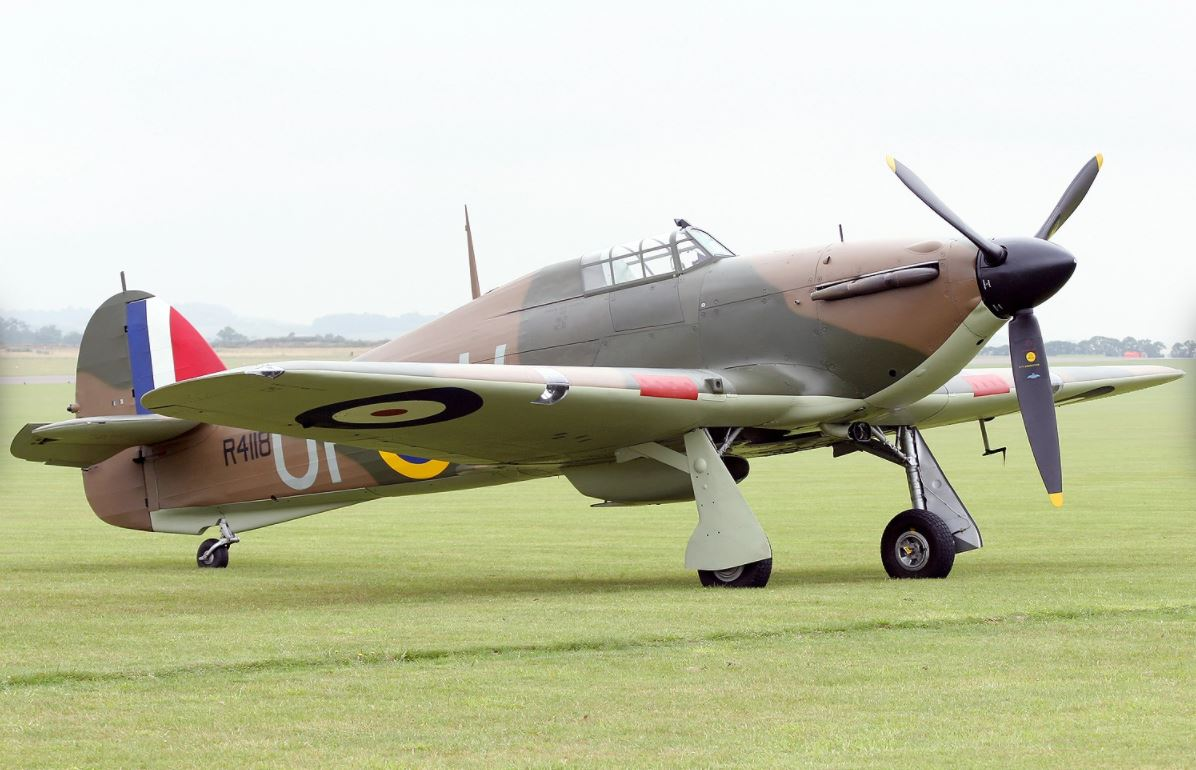
RAF Hawker Hurricane Mk I

A few minutes after the attack by Vals from Zuikaku, Zeros from Sōryū and Akagi arrived and at 07:50 the Vals from Shōkaku attacked. The three Fulmars of 803 NAS were shot down as they climbed away from the airfield and the 30 Squadron Hurricanes that got into the air were also bounced. At the harbour, 258 Squadron arrived as Vals began to dive. The Hurricanes attacked the Vals, later being credited with shooting down three and damaging several more but lost nine Hurricanes to the Japanese fighter escorts. Two of the remaining five Hurricanes were damaged and four pilots were killed. As the Hurricanes engaged the Vals and Zeros, Kates arrived from Sōryū at 07:56, Hiryū at 08:05 and Akagi at 08:08 with fighter escorts from Zuikaku. Five Kates were damaged in the first two waves but the third wave and its escorts were unopposed and were on the way back by 08:15. The Vals from Shōkaku took three minutes to bomb.

The Japanese bombers hit and set on fire the armed merchant cruiser HMS Hector with five bombs, settling it on the bottom. The submarine depot ship HMS Lucia was damaged. Five Vals from Zuikaku hit the British tanker MV San Cirilo (8,012 GRT) and 53 Kates, sank the destroyer HMS Tenedos, killing 33 members of the crew. The bombers hit port facilities and damaged the merchant ship SS Benledi (5,943 GRT), the Norwegian tanker MV Soli (5,834 GRT) was damaged and beached; the British freighter SS Clan Murdoch (5,960 GRT) was damaged. The Zeros and the last Vals from Zuikaku turned for home between 09:20 and 09:35. A flight of Fulmars from 803 NAS returned from a patrol, the crews unaware of the Japanese raid. The Japanese aircraft landed on their carriers from 09:45 to 10:30 and claimed a destroyer, a merchant ship and ten smaller vessels sunk; damage to Ratmalana airfield was negligible.

=== Subsequent events ===
==== 11 Squadron ====
Ten Blenheims of 11 Squadron took off at 08:30 to attack the Combined Fleet but were briefed with the wrong directions and failed to find the Japanese ships.

==== Reconnaissance ====
Catalinas based in Ceylon and Albacores from the Eastern Fleet continued to fly reconnaissance sorties during the day. At 08:40, three Zeros apiece from Hiryū, Shōkaku and Zuikaku shot down Catalina FV-R of 205 Squadron and killed the crew but not before the gunners damaged two of the Zeros from Zuikaku. Later on, three Zeros from Hiryū attacked two 827 NAS Albacores from the Eastern Fleet and shot one down, the crew being killed. Another 827 NAS Albacore was attacked by Zeros from Hiryū but escaped in cloud.

==== Sinking of Dorsetshire and Cornwall ====
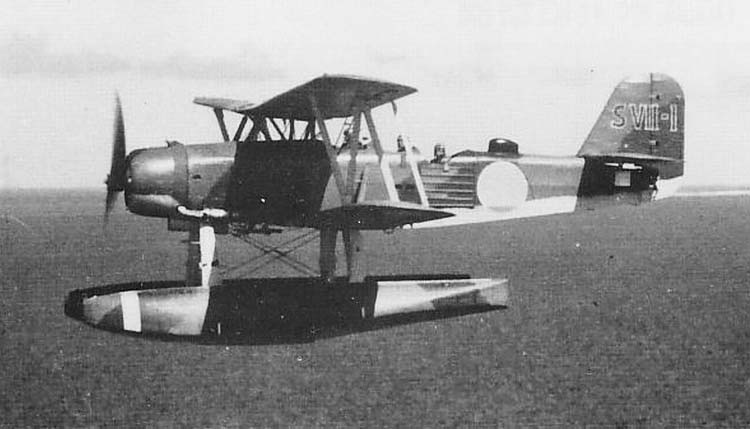
Kawanishi E7K2 (Alf) seaplane

Aircraft from Japanese cruisers searched the area south of Ceylon for the British ships that had not been found in port. At 10:50, a Kawanishi E7K2 (Alf) from the Japanese cruiser Abukuma, found Cornwall and Dorsetshire but the crew reported that they had spotted two destroyers 200 nmi (370 km; 230 mi) west of the Striking Force, to the south-east of the Combined Fleet. Cornwall was heading for Colombo to resume its refit and Dorsetshire to escort a troop convoy. The 5th Carrier Squadron, in reserve, with its aircraft loaded with bombs for another attack on Colombo, was ordered to attack the British cruisers instead.

Rearming with torpedoes took too long and the 2nd Carrier Squadron attacked with 18 Vals from Sōryū, 18 from Hiryū and 17 from Akagi. Thirty-seven aircraft carried 250 kg (551 lb) semi-armour piercing bombs and the other 16 were armed with 241 kg (532 lb) high-explosive bombs. The Vals from Sōryū attacked out of the sun from 14:40 to 14:55 and claimed 14 hits. The Vals from Hiryū commenced their attack soon after those from Sōryū and the Vals from Akagi claimed seven hits on one cruiser and eight hits on the other. Dorsetshire was hit on its aircraft catapult, bridge, engine rooms and boiler rooms; the rudder jammed and the cruiser sank at 14:48. Cornwall was hit by 15 bombs and sank six minutes later. The 1,646 men on both ships suffered 424 killed and 1,222 men rescued (after thirty hours in the sun, in waters inhabited by sharks) by the cruiser HMS Enterprise and the destroyers HMS Paladin and Panther.

== Aftermath ==
=== Casualties ===
On land, four Naval officers, 35 ratings, twelve Goanese and Indian Lascars were killed and 37 civilians, inmates of a psychiatric hospital were killed in the bombing. At sea the Navy suffered the loss of 424 men killed in the sinking of Dorsetshire and Cornwall. Japanese fighter pilots claimed 33 fighters and 11 probables; five were claimed by the Val crews from Shōkaku and one by a Val from Zuikaku. The real loss was 21 Hurricanes (two repairable) and several Hurricanes damaged. The Japanese fighter pilots claimed eight Swordfish, two probables and one Swordfish damaged, with a real loss of six. On the British side, 258 Squadron claimed four aircraft shot down, one probable and four damaged for a loss of five pilots killed and two wounded, eight Hurricanes shot down and two badly damaged. In 30 Squadron, 14 aircraft were claimed shot down, with six probables and five aircraft damaged.

The Fleet Air Arm pilots of 803 NAS and 806 NAS claimed one Japanese aircraft shot down for a loss of three pilots killed and four Fulmars shot down. Anti-aircraft gunners claimed five aircraft shot down for a total of 24 Japanese aircraft confirmed shot down, seven probables and a minimum of nine aircraft damaged. Both sides mistakenly over-claimed; the Japanese lost a Zero from Sōryū, three from Hiryū were damaged, five Vals from Zuikaku were shot down and six suffered damage, Shōkaku lost one Val shot down and one damaged. The true total was six Vals and seven damaged, one Zero shot down and three damaged and five Kates damaged. A Japanese bomber pilot crashed and was taken prisoner.

== Japanese order of battle ==
Supporting ships not shown

1st Carrier Fleet
Ship	(English)	Flag	Class	Notes
Vice-Admiral Chūichi Nagumo, C-in-C 1st Air Fleet
Air attack Group
1st Carrier Squadron
Akagi	Red Castle	Imperial Japanese Navy	Amagi-class aircraft carrier	
2nd Carrier Squadron
Sōryū	Blue [or Green] Dragon	Imperial Japanese Navy	aircraft carrier	
Hiryū	Flying Dragon	Imperial Japanese Navy	aircraft carrier	
5th Carrier Squadron (reserve)
Shōkaku	Soaring Crane	Imperial Japanese Navy	Shōkaku-class aircraft carrier	
Zuikaku	Auspicious Crane	Imperial Japanese Navy	Shōkaku-class aircraft carrier	

=== Japanese aircraft ===
1st Air Fleet
Fighter	Dive bomber	Torpedo bomber	Notes
Air attack Group
Akagi
19 Zero	17 Aichi D3A (Val)	18 Nakajima B5N (Kate)	54 aircraft, not all used on raid
Sōryū
20 Zero	18 Aichi D3A (Val)	18 Nakajima B5N (Kate)	56 aircraft, not all used on raid
Hiryū
18 Zero	18 Aichi D3A (Val)	18 Nakajima B5N (Kate)	54 aircraft, not all used on raid
Reserve
Shōkaku
18 Zero	19 Aichi D3A (Val)	19 Nakajima B5N (Kate)	56 aircraft, not used on raid
Zuikaku
18 Zero	19 Aichi D3A (Val)	18 Nakajima B5N (Kate)	55 aircraft, not used on raid
Totals
93 Zero	91 Aichi D3A (Val)	91 Nakajima B5N (Kate)	275, 111 reserves

=== Japanese air plan ===
Commander Fuchida Mitsuo (Akagi) (Note: The Aircraft numbers are inconsistent with the text and those of other authors.)
Unit	Aircraft	Carrier	Target	Notes
1st Attack Unit	17 Nakajima B5N (Kate)	Akagi	Ground facilities and ships	
3rd Attack Unit	18 Nakajima B5N (Kate)	Sōryū	Ships and ground targets	
4th Attack Unit	18 Nakajima B5N (Kate)	Hiryū	Ships and ground targets	
5th Attack Unit	19 Aichi D3A (Val)	Shōkaku	Ships, airfield; bombing and strafing	
6th Attack Unit	19 Aichi D3A (Val)	Zuikaku	Ships, airfield; bombing and strafing	
1st Air Control Unit	9 Mitsubishi A6M Zero	Akagi	Escort and ground strafing	
3rd Air Control Unit	9 Mitsubishi A6M Zero	Sōryū	Escort and ground strafing	

=== Ships sunk ===
British warships sunk or damaged, 5 April 1942
Ship	Flag	Class	Notes
Colombo harbour
HMS Hector	Royal Navy	Armed merchant cruiser	Damaged, settled on bottom
HMS Lucia	Royal Navy	submarine depot ship	Damaged
HMS Tenedos	Royal Navy	S-class destroyer	Sunk
At sea
HMS Cornwall	Royal Navy	County-class cruiser	Sunk
HMS Dorsetshire	Royal Navy	County-class cruiser	Sunk

Merchant ships sunk or damaged, 5 April 1942
Ship	Flag	GRT	Notes
Colombo harbour
SS Benledi	Merchant Navy	5,943	Damaged
SS Clan Murdoch	Merchant Navy	5,960	Damaged
MV Soli	Norway	5,834	Damaged

== British order of battle ==
=== Army ===
Ceylon garrison, March 1942
Unit	Flag	Type	Notes
Ceylon Defence Force
Ceylon Light Infantry	British Army	Infantry	
Ceylon Planters Rifle Corps	British Army	Infantry	
Colombo Town Guard	British Army	Infantry	
Ceylon Garrison Artillery	British Army	Artillery	6-inch naval, 9.2-inch naval
65th Heavy AA Regt	British Army	Anti-Aircraft	40 × 3.7-inch AA,, 4 × 3-inch 20 cwt AA
43rd Light AA Regt	British Army	Anti-Aircraft	69 × Bofors 40 mm AA from March 1942
Indian Army
34th Indian Division	British Indian Army	Infantry	
21st (East Africa) Infantry Brigade	British Army	Infantry	Attached to 34th Indian Division
Australian Army
6th Australian Division
16th Australian Brigade	Australian Army	Infantry	
17th Australian Brigade	Australian Army	Infantry	

=== Royal Air Force, Fleet Air Arm ===
222 Group RAF
	Flag	Type	Base	Notes
RAF
Colombo
11 Squadron	Royal Air Force	Bomber	Racecourse	14 Blenheim Mk IV
258 Squadron	Royal Air Force	Fighter	Racecourse	9 Hurricane Mk IIb, 5 Mk Ib, 8 shot down
30 Squadron	Royal Air Force	Fighter	RAF Ratmalana	22 Hurricane Mk IIb, 8 shot down
Galle
202 Squadron	Royal Air Force	Flying boat	RAF Koggala	1 Catalina
205 Squadron	Royal Air Force	Flying boat	RAF Koggala	Catalina FV-R
413 Squadron	Royal Canadian Air Force	Flying boat	RAF Koggala	3 Catalina
Netherlands Naval Aviation Service
Groep Vliegtuig-2	Marineluchtvaartdienst	Flying boat	RAF Koggala	(Aircraft Group-2 [GVT-2]) Catalina Y-64
Groep Vliegtuig-16	Marineluchtvaartdienst	Flying boat	RAF Koggala	(GVT-16) Catalinas Y-55, Y-56 and Y-57
Trincomalee
261 Squadron	Royal Air Force	Fighter	RAF China Bay	1 Hurricane Mk I, 17 Mk IIb
273 Squadron	Royal Air Force	Fighter	RAF China Bay	16 Fulmar Mk I, Mk II
788 Naval Air Squadron	Fleet Air Arm	Torpedo-bomber	RAF China Bay	6 Swordfish, Albacore, 6 Swordfish shot down
803 Naval Air Squadron	Fleet Air Arm	Carrier fighter	RAF China Bay	12 Fulmar Mk II
806 Naval Air Squadron	Fleet Air Arm	Carrier fighter	RAF China Bay	12 Fulmar Mk II
814 Naval Air Squadron	Fleet Air Arm	Torpedo-bomber	RAF China Bay	10 Swordfish ashore from HMS Hermes
HMS Indomitable	Fleet Air Arm	Fighter	RAF China Bay	2 Martlet ashore from Indomitable

=== Eastern Fleet ===
Eastern Fleet (Note: Royal Australian Navy ships flew the British white ensign until 1967.)
Ship	Flag	Class	Notes
Force A
HMS Formidable	Royal Navy	Illustrious-class aircraft carrier	
HMS Indomitable	Royal Navy	Illustrious-class aircraft carrier	
HMS Warspite	Royal Navy	Queen Elizabeth-class battleship	
Heavy cruisers
HMS Cornwall	Royal Navy	County-class cruiser	5 April, sunk, 01°54′N, 77°45′E, 190†
HMS Dorsetshire	Royal Navy	County-class cruiser	5 April, sunk, 01°54′N, 77°45′E, 234†
Light cruisers
HMS Emerald	Royal Navy	Emerald-class cruiser	
HMS Enterprise	Royal Navy	Emerald-class cruiser	
Destroyers
HMS Foxhound	Royal Navy	F-class destroyer	
HMS Hotspur	Royal Navy	H-class destroyer	
HMS Napier	Royal Navy	N-class destroyer	
HMAS Nestor	Royal Navy	N-class destroyer	
HMS Paladin	Royal Navy	P-class destroyer	
HMS Panther	Royal Navy	P-class destroyer	
Force B
HMS Hermes	Royal Navy	aircraft carrier	12 Fairey Swordfish, 10 ashore, 2 u/s
HMS Ramillies	Royal Navy	Revenge-class battleship	
HMS Resolution	Royal Navy	Revenge-class battleship	
HMS Revenge	Royal Navy	Revenge-class battleship	
HMS Royal Sovereign	Royal Navy	Revenge-class battleship	
Light cruisers
HMS Caledon	Royal Navy	C-class cruiser	
HMS Dragon	Royal Navy	Danae-class cruiser	
Jacob van Heemskerck	Royal Netherlands Navy	Tromp-class cruiser	
Destroyers
HMS Arrow	Royal Navy	A-class destroyer	
HMS Decoy	Royal Navy	D-class destroyer	
HMS Fortune	Royal Navy	F-class destroyer	
HMS Griffin	Royal Navy	G-class destroyer	
HNLMS Isaac Sweers	Royal Netherlands Navy	Gerard Callenburgh-class destroyer	
HMAS Norman	Royal Navy	N-class destroyer	
HMS Scout	Royal Navy	S-class destroyer	
HMAS Vampire	Royal Navy	V-class destroyer	

== See also ==
- Indian Ocean raid
- Ceylon in World War II

== Bibliography ==
- Behrens, C. B. A. (1955). Hancock, K. (ed.). Merchant Shipping and the Demands of War. History of the Second World War United Kingdom Civil Series. London: HMSO. OCLC 498039 – via Archive Foundation.
- Boyd, Andrew (2017). The Royal Navy in Eastern Waters. Barnsley: Seaforth Publishing (Pen & Sword). ISBN 978-1-4738-9248-4.
- Brown, David (1995) [1990]. Warship Losses of World War Two (2nd rev. ed.). London: Arms and Armour Press. ISBN 1-85409-278-2.
- Defensive Phase. Ministry of Defence (Navy) War with Japan. Vol. II. London: HMSO. 1995. ISBN 978-0-11-772818-9.
- Greenhous, B.; et al. (1994). The Official History of the Royal Canadian Air Force: The Crucible of War, 1939–1945. Vol. III. Toronto: University of Toronto Press and Department of National Defence. ISBN 978-0-8020-0574-8. D2-63/3-1994E.
- Hurstfield, Joel (1953). Hancock, W. K. (ed.). The Control of Raw Materials. History of the Second World War, United Kingdom Civil Series (War Production Series, Director: M. M. Postan). London: HMSO and Longman, Green and Co. OCLC 698112.
- Jackson, Ashley (2006). "Ch 11 The Islands of the Indian Ocean". The British Empire and the Second World War. London and New York: Hambledon Continuum. pp. 307−349. ISBN 1-85285-417-0.
- Jordan, Roger W. (2006) [1999]. The World's Merchant Fleets 1939: The Particulars and Wartime Fates of 6,000 Ships (2nd ed.). London: Chatham/Lionel Leventhal. ISBN 978-1-86176-293-1.
- Joslen, Hubert Frank (1960). Orders of Battle: United Kingdom and Colonial Formations and Units in the Second World War 1939–1945 Based on Official Documents. History of the Second World War. Vol. II. London: HMSO. OCLC 1110934538.
- Richards, Denis; Saunders, Hilary St. George (1975) [1954]. The Fight Avails. Official History of the Royal Air Force 1935–1945. Vol. II. London: HMSO. ISBN 0-11-771593-X – via Archive Foundation.
- Rohwer, Jürgen; Hümmelchen, Gerhard (2005) [1972]. Chronology of the War at Sea, 1939–1945: The Naval History of World War Two (3rd rev. ed.). London: Chatham. ISBN 1-86176-257-7.
- Roskill, Stephen (1956). War at Sea 1939–1945: The Period of Balance. United Kingdom Military Series. Vol. II. London: HMSO. OCLC 59620954 – via Archive Foundation.
- Shores, Christopher; Cull, Brian; Izawa, Yasuho (2014) [1993]. Bloody Shambles: The Defence of Sumatra to the Fall of Burma. Vol. II. London: Grub Street. ISBN 978-0-94-881767-0.
- Stephenson, Charles (2022). The Eastern Fleet and the Indian Ocean 1942–1944: The Fleet that had to Hide. Barnsley and New York: Pen & Sword Books. ISBN 978-1-52679-776-6.
- Stille, Mark (2023). Japan's Indian Ocean Raid 1942: The Allies' lowest Ebb. Campaign No. 396. Oxford: Osprey. ISBN 978-1-47-285418-6.
- Stuart, Robert (2014). "Air Raid Colombo, 5 April 1942: The Fully Expected Surprise Attack". Royal Canadian Air Force Journal. 3 (4). Department of National Defence of Canada. ISSN 1927-761X.
- Woodburn Kirby, Stanley; Addis, C. T.; Meiklejohn, J. F.; Roberts, M. R.; Wards, G. T.; Desoer, N. L. (2004) [1958]. The War against Japan: India's Most Dangerous Hour. History of the Second World War, united Kingdom Military Series. Vol. II (facs. pbk. Naval & Military Press, Uckfield ed.). London: HMSO. ISBN 978-1-84-574061-0 – via Archive Foundation.
- Wragg, David (2001) [2019]. The Fleet Air Arm Handbook 1939–1945. Stroud: Sutton. ISBN 978-0-75-092596-9.
