= Italian ship Tifone =

Tifone has been borne by at least two ships of the Italian Navy and may refer to:

- Italian patrol boat Tifone, previously the merchant ship Bata, purchased by Italy in 1916 and renamed. She was scrapped in 1920.
- Italian torpedo boat Tifone, a Ciclone-class torpedo boat launched in 1942 and sunk in 1943.
