= Battle of the Cigno Convoy =

1943 battle of World War II

Coordinates: 37°48′35.22″N 12°11′29.01″E

- Part of the Battle of the Mediterranean of the Second World War
- Belluno (ex. Fort de France) in a pre-war photograph
Date	16 April 1943
Location	Mediterranean off Marettimo Island
Result	Italian victory

Belligerents
United Kingdom	Italy

Commanders and leaders
(United Kingdom) Basil Jones	(Kingdom of Italy) Carlo Maccaferri

Strength
2 destroyers	4 torpedo boats; transport ship

Casualties and losses
10 men killed; 14 wounded; 1 destroyer scuttled; 1 destroyer damaged	~130 men killed; 1 torpedo boat sunk; 1 torpedo boat severely damaged

The Battle of the Cigno Convoy (or Belluno Convoy) was a naval engagement between two British destroyers of the Royal Navy and two torpedo boats of the Regia Marina (Italian Royal Navy) south-east of Marettimo island to the west of Sicily, in the early hours of 16 April 1943. The Italian ships were escorting the transport ship Belluno (4,200 gross register tons) to Tunisia; the torpedo boat Tifone, carried aviation fuel. The British force was fought off by the Italian ships for the loss of a torpedo boat. A British destroyer, disabled by Italian gunfire, had to be scuttled after the action when it was clear that it could not make port before dawn.

== Background ==
After Operation Torch, the Allied invasion of French North Africa (8 November 1942), the Allies began a campaign to achieve naval and air supremacy around North Africa and Sicily to interdict the Axis supply route from Italy. In February 1943, the Allied air and sea campaign inflicted a loss of 20 per cent on Axis merchant shipping. In March the rate of loss reached 50 per cent and by April, Axis merchant ship sinkings averaged of 3.3 per day. The supply route for the Regia Marina from Italian ports to Tunisia was shorter than the previous route to Tripoli in Libya but Allied air supremacy and the attrition of Axis merchant shipping since 1940 made it almost impossible to assemble large convoys, despite the superior port facilities in Tunisia.

A chronic lack of fuel also limited the sailings of Italian escort vessels and led the Regia Marina (Italian Royal Navy) and the Kriegsmarine (German Navy) to use smaller ships and barges, escorted by small, fast destroyers and torpedo boats. The smaller craft were harder to find when sailing dispersed and quicker to unload. Due to the loss of many faster cargo ships earlier in the war, convoys were only capable of 8–10 kn (15–19 km/h; 9.2–11.5 mph). A huge extension of minefields planted by both sides had limited the scope for Allied surface ships based at Bône in Algeria to attack Axis shipping to a far greater extent than during the Libyan campaign; Malta-based ships also had little success. Allied aircraft had become a greater threat to Axis sea traffic.

== Prelude ==
On 15 April, the freighter Belluno (4,200 gross register tons) departed Naples for Trapani in Sicily, carrying ammunition for the Axis forces (Army Group Africa [Heeresgruppe Afrika/Gruppo d'Armate Africa]) in Tunisia. Belluno was escorted by the torpedo boats Tifone (carrying aviation fuel) and Climene. At Trapani, Cigno (flagship, Lieutenant commander Carlo Maccaferri) and Cassiopea (Capitano di Corvetta Virginio Nasta) rendezvoused with the convoy to look for British motor torpedo boats (MTB), a force of which had disabled two ships of a convoy off Cani Rocks on 1 April.

During the afternoon of 15 April, the British destroyers HMS Pakenham and Paladin were on an exercise off Malta. A signal arrived from the C-in-C Malta that ships had been sighted off Pantelleria, giving orders to investigate; the ships moved off at 17:45. After eight hours the British destroyers passed Pantelleria at 20 kn (37 km/h; 23 mph) with Pakenham in the lead and Paladin .3 nmi (0.56 km; 0.35 mi) astern. On 16 April the convoy departed Trapani at 01:00.

At 02:42 Pakenham obtained a radar contact at 7,200 yd (3.6 nmi; 4.1 mi; 6.6 km), lost it as Pakenham turned and regained it at 02:45. The contact was seen to be two torpedo boats in line ahead, on a reciprocal course at 6,000 yd (3.0 nmi; 3.4 mi; 5.5 km) range. The British destroyers turned to starboard to get down moon, silhouetting the Italian ships. At 02:38 Cigno spotted shapes in the dark at a range of 9,000 yd (4.4 nmi; 5.1 mi; 8.2 km). Cigno turned towards the shapes, switched on its fighting lights and sent recognition signals. Pakenham also showed fighting lights and turned to starboard towards the Italian ships, as Paladin carried on to the north around the flank of the Italian convoy. Cigno and Pakenham closed quickly and Maccaferri saw that the shapes were British destroyers.

== Action ==
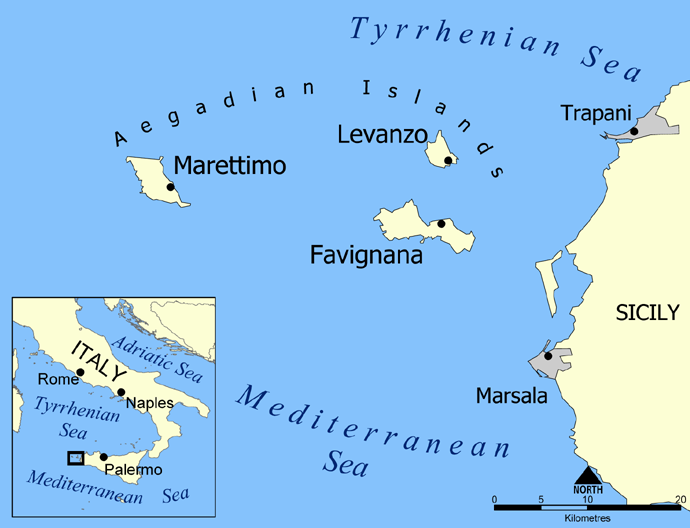
A map showing Marettimo, the western-most of the Aegadian Islands

At 02:48, after illuminating the foremost Italian ship, Pakenham opened fire at 2,700 yd (1.3 nmi; 1.5 mi; 2.5 km). When the range was estimated by Cigno at 2,500 yd (1.2 nmi; 1.4 mi; 2.3 km) it also opened fire and hit Pakenham on the stern with a 100 mm (3.9 in) 100/47 shell, starting a fire and disabling its aft torpedo tubes. Cassiopea, having steered north north-west to confront Paladin, opened fire at 4,500 yd (2.2 nmi; 2.6 mi; 4.1 km). As soon as the firing was heard, Belluno and its escorts turned for Trapani. Pakenham received a second hit at 02:50 which exploded in the lower deck and caused a much bigger fire, leading to Stevens ordering the aft magazine to be flooded.

The ships were very close and both fired with every weapon that could be brought to bear, filling the air with multi-coloured tracer ammunition. Pakenham hit Cigno in the forward boiler just to the rear of the bridge at 02:53, releasing a large cloud of smoke and steam over the ship as it came to a stop. While drifting, Cigno fired torpedoes at Pakenham to no effect and Pakenham replied at 02:58 from its undamaged forward torpedo tubes and struck Cigno amidships, breaking the ship in two. (Note: Arthur Evans wrote that Paladin launched four torpedoes at Cigno, causing the fatal hit.) The stern quickly sank but the forward section of the ship stayed afloat; its 100 mm (3.9 in) gun-crew continuing to fire.

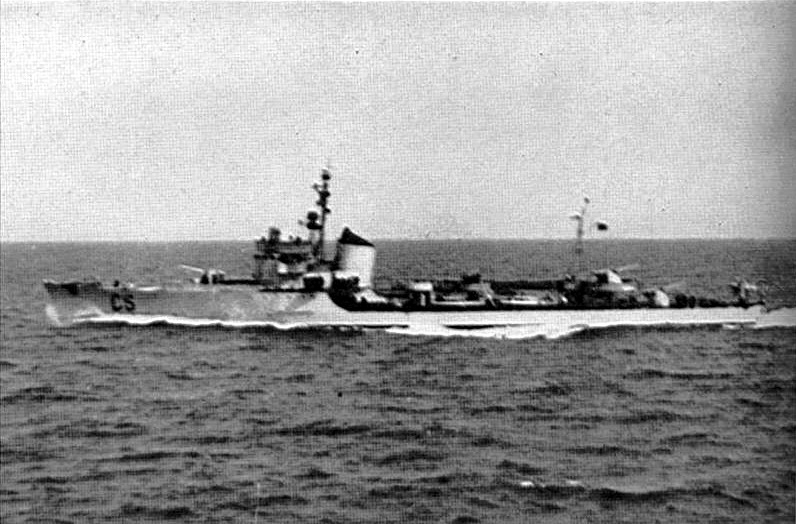
Italian torpedo boat Cassiopea

Pakenham turned north towards Cassiopea but just after 03:00, one or two shells, fired either from the forward half of Cigno as it was sinking or from Cassiopea, hit on the waterline cutting the boiler tubes and causing the engine room to flood; the steam forcing the engine-room crew to evacuate. Pakenham listed 15° to port, electrical power was lost and stopped in the water, fires burning. Cassiopea and Paladin had not been hit until Paladin raked Cassiopea with a burst of QF 2-pounder pom-pom fire, which jammed the rudder and started a big fire forward and a smaller one aft. The crews of the two 100 mm (3.9 in) guns to the rear remained in action and at 03:06 Cassiopea fired a torpedo at 1,200 yd (0.59 nmi; 0.68 mi; 1.1 km) to no effect.

At 03:08 Paladin doused its lights and ceased fire, which misled the crew of Cassiopea into claiming a hit. Paladin was taking evasive action and broke away to the south-east, after its captain mistook Cassiopea for a Capitani Romani-class cruiser, because Italian shells exploding in the water caused unusually large splashes. Pakenham had regained power and continued north, achieving a hit on Cassiopea at 4,000 yd (2.0 nmi; 2.3 mi; 3.7 km); Cassiopea returned fire from its rearward guns and scored two hits on its stern pom-pom mounting and searchlight at 03:13. Pakenham ceased fire and turned to follow Paladin; Cassiopea was badly damaged, with two large fires onboard and did not pursue.

== Aftermath ==
=== Analysis ===
In 2009, Vincent O'Hara wrote that the Battle of the Cigno Convoy was a rare occasion when Italian naval escorts defeated a night attack by British ships. The British thought that they had been engaged by two fleet destroyers and believed that they had sunk them, putting the loss of Pakenham down to an unlucky hit and the lack of experience of both British crews. O'Hara wrote that experience had more influence on the result; the British ships had recently been transferred from the Indian Ocean and Rich deciding to turn away was "unusually cautious". The two Italian crews were veteran and spotted the British ships before the British opened fire but for the Italians to call the engagement a success when one ship was saved for the loss of one escort and another seriously damaged showed the extent of the British ascendancy in night-fighting.

=== Casualties ===
Cigno suffered the loss of 103 crew. Pakenham suffered nine crew killed and fifteen wounded; one of whom died on 18 April.

=== Subsequent operations ===
Cassiopea was towed back to Trapani by Climene and later to Taranto for repairs. Belluno and Tifone sailed from Trapani at 05:45 and reached Tunis; Tifone unloaded its cargo of aviation fuel at Bizerte. Pakenham and Paladin made for Malta at 25 kn (46 km/h; 29 mph) but high-pressure steam leaking into Pakenham's engine room made it impossible for the crew to remain. Jones could shut off the steam and wait for the engine room to cool before making repairs but this would take two hours or keep going until the boiler feed-water ran out and the ship stopped in the water. With Axis airfields so close, Jones continued and made another 13 nmi (24 km; 15 mi) before losing power, stopping at 03:50. Paladin was able to tow Pakenham at 4–5 kn (4.6–5.8 mph; 7.4–9.3 km/h). At 06:00, as dawn rose, two aircraft were spotted; the ships dropped the tow as they engaged the Axis aircraft, which were followed by two more, which failed to damage the ships. The tow was resumed at 06:20 but the cable broke after a few minutes; the ships were too far from Malta for Allied fighters to keep a standing patrol over the ships, when they could make only 5 kn (9.3 km/h; 5.8 mph) at best. Orders were received from Malta at 06:30 to sink Pakenham; as a dogfight went on overhead, Jones ordered the destroyer scuttled. Paladin took on the crew and returned to Malta at 32 kn (59 km/h; 37 mph).

== Orders of battle ==
=== Belluno ===
Belluno
Ship	year	Flag	GRT	Notes
Belluno	1935	Merchant Navy	4,278	(Ex-French Fort de France) Naples to Tunisia, turned back

=== Convoy escorts ===
Escorts for Belluno
Ship	Flag	Notes	
Tifone	Kingdom of Italy	Ciclone-class torpedo boat	Escort Trapani to Tunisia
Cassiopea	Kingdom of Italy	Spica-class torpedo boat	Escort Trapani to Tunisia, scouting force
Cigno	Kingdom of Italy	Spica-class torpedo boat	Flagship, Lieutenant-Commander Carlo Maccaferri, scouting force; sunk
Climene	Kingdom of Italy	Spica-class torpedo boat	Escort Trapani to Tunisia

=== Allied ships ===
British destroyers
Ship	Flag	Type	Notes
HMS Pakenham	Royal Navy	P-class destroyer	Flagship Captain J. S. Stevens, scuttled
HMS Paladin	Royal Navy	P-class destroyer	Damaged
