= HMS Panther (G41) =

Ship of the Royal Navy of the UK

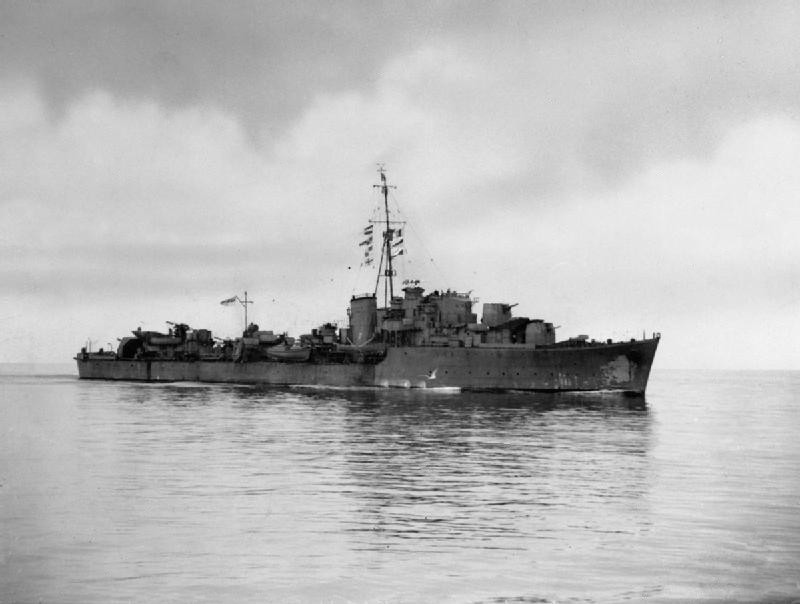
- Panther coming into Hvalfjord in Iceland, January 1942

History

United Kingdom
- Name: HMS Panther
- Ordered: 20 October 1939
- Builder: Fairfield Shipbuilding and Engineering Company
- Laid down: 15 July 1940
- Launched: 28 May 1941
- Commissioned: 12 December 1941
- Identification: Pennant number: G41
- Fate: Sunk by Aerial attack, 9 October 1943

General characteristics
- Class & type: P-class destroyer
- Displacement: 1,640 long tons (1,666 t) standard; 2,250 long tons (2,286 t) full
- Length: 345 ft (105 m) o/a
- Beam: 35 ft (11 m)
- Draught: 12 ft 3 in (3.73 m)
- Installed power: 40,000 shp (30,000 kW); 2 × Admiralty 3-drum boilers
- Propulsion: 2 shafts; 2 × steam turbines
- Speed: 36 knots (67 km/h; 41 mph)
- Range: 3,850 nautical miles (7,130 km; 4,430 mi) at 20 knots (37 km/h; 23 mph)
- Complement: 176
- Armament: 5 × single QF 4 in Mk.V (102 mm); 1 × quadruple QF 2-pdr (40 mm) Mk.VIII; 4 × single QF 20 mm Oerlikon; 1 × quadruple 21-inch (533 mm) torpedo tubes; 4 × throwers and 2 × racks for 70 depth charges

HMS Panther was a P-class destroyer built for the Royal Navy during the Second World War. After commissioning on 12 December 1941, she made a short trip to Iceland with the battleship King George V, then escorted a British convoy to India. In early April 1942, Panther rescued survivors from two cruisers sunk in the Indian Ocean, after which she took part in Operation Ironclad, the Allied invasion of Vichy French-held Madagascar, and sank a French submarine with another destroyer. Panther then returned to the Mediterranean, and participated in the Allied landings in North Africa, but was severely damaged in an air attack and had to undergo repairs in Gibraltar. After taking on survivors from the torpedoed SS Strathallan, Panther escorted two Allied convoys in the Atlantic. She next supported the Allied attack on Sicily, then sailed to the Aegean Sea in the Dodecanese Campaign. On 9 October 1943, Panther was sunk by German Stuka dive-bombers with 33 dead.

== Description ==
The P-class destroyers were repeats of the preceding O class, except that they were armed with 4-inch (102 mm) anti-aircraft guns. They displaced 1,640 long tons (1,670 t) at standard load and 2,250 long tons (2,290 t) at deep load. The ships had an overall length of 345 feet (105.2 m), a beam of 35 feet (10.7 m) and a deep draught of 12 feet 3 inches (3.7 m). They were powered by two Parsons geared steam turbines, each driving one propeller shaft, using steam provided by two Admiralty three-drum boilers. The turbines developed a total of 40,000 shaft horsepower (30,000 kW) and gave a maximum speed of 36 knots (67 km/h; 41 mph). The ships carried a maximum of 500 long tons (510 t) of fuel oil that gave them a range of 3,850 nautical miles (7,130 km; 4,430 mi) at 20 knots (37 km/h; 23 mph). The ships' complement was 176 officers and ratings.

Panther was armed with five QF 4-inch Mark V guns in single mounts, two pairs superfiring fore and aft and the fifth gun replacing the aft torpedo tubes. Her light anti-aircraft suite was composed of one quadruple mount for 2-pounder "pom-pom" guns and four single Oerlikon 20 mm cannon. The ship was fitted with one above-water quadruple mount for 21-inch (533 mm) torpedoes. The aft mount was later reinstated and one 4-inch gun removed. The ship was fitted with four depth charge throwers and two racks for 70 depth charges.

== Construction and career ==
Panther was ordered by the British Admiralty on 20 October 1939, just months into World War II. She was laid down on 15 July 1940 by the Fairfield Shipbuilding and Engineering Company (Govan, Scotland) and launched on 28 May of the following year. Panther was commissioned to the fleet on 12 December 1941, the fifth Royal Navy ship to bear this name. Her construction had cost £404,046, excluding armament and wireless communication equipment. Panther was adopted by the community of Poplar, London after a Warship Week in March 1942.

After sea trials and working up in the River Clyde area, Panther departed for Scapa Flow and arrived there on 1 January 1942. From 17 to 19 January, Panther escorted the battleship HMS King George V to Iceland, then accompanied the battleship back to Scapa Flow in early February. On 17 February, she escorted the Allied convoy WS16 along with HMS Eagle, Renown and Hermione from the British Isles to India. Panther left the convoy at Freetown on 1 March.

Between 29 March and 12 April 1942, Panther was part of the British surface Force A, which operated in the Indian Ocean. During the Japanese Indian Ocean Raid, she was dispatched along with two fleet aircraft carriers, three cruisers, and five destroyers to intercept and engage the Japanese force, with their carriers as prime targets. On 5 April however, two of the British cruisers, HMS Cornwall and Dorsetshire, were sunk by Japanese aircraft; Panther was ordered to collect survivors. She participated in picking up 1,122 sailors out of 1,546 from both ships along with Enterprise and Paladin.

In early May 1942, Panther took part in Operation Ironclad, the Allied invasion of Vichy French-held Madagascar. She supported troop landing of the 5th, then bombarded enemy positions the next day. On 8 May, in conjunction with the destroyer Active she sank the Vichy French submarine Monge, which was attempting to attack British ships. Panther then refitted in England during June and July 1942. In November, she escorted ships during the Allied landings in North Africa, and was severely damaged in an air attack; three men were killed and ten more injured. Fires broke out, and Panther returned to Gibraltar at low speed, entering No.2 dock for repairs.

After post-repair trials, Panther formed part of convoy KMF 5, which included the troopship SS Strathallan in December 1942. On 21 December the troopship was torpedoed by the U-562; Panther, along with other escort vessels took on board the crew and troops to Oran.

In January 1943, Panther escorted the aircraft HMS Illustrious from Freetown back to Gibraltar, then refueled at Casablanca. After a refit in Great Britain, Panther was assigned to the 40th Escort Group in March and escorted the Atlantic Convoy HX 233. In early May, Pathfinder continued escort duties, this time with Convoy ONS 5.

During the next three months, Panther, now with the 14th Destroyer Flotilla, took part in Operation Husky, the Allied invasion of Sicily; she screened major ships from submarine attacks and bombarded Italian targets. In September 1943, Panther continued escorting Allied warships during Operation Avalanche and Operation Slapstick, then was sent to the Aegean Sea to protect Allied islands after the surrender of Italy during the Dodecanese Campaign. On 9 October, Panther was sailing south of the Scarpento Channel with other Allied vessels; the naval force came under air attack by Junkers Ju 87 Stuka aircraft of I. Group Stuka Wing 3 from Megara airbase at noon. Panther received two direct hits, broke in two, and sank less than ten minutes later in position 35°48′N 27°36′E. (Note: uboat.net and naval-history.net state that Panther sank in seconds.) Thirty-three men aboard Panther were killed. Her sinking was the last Stuka bomber victory over the British.
