= HMS Dorsetshire (40) =

Heavy cruiser of the Royal Navy

Coordinates: 1°54′N 77°45′E

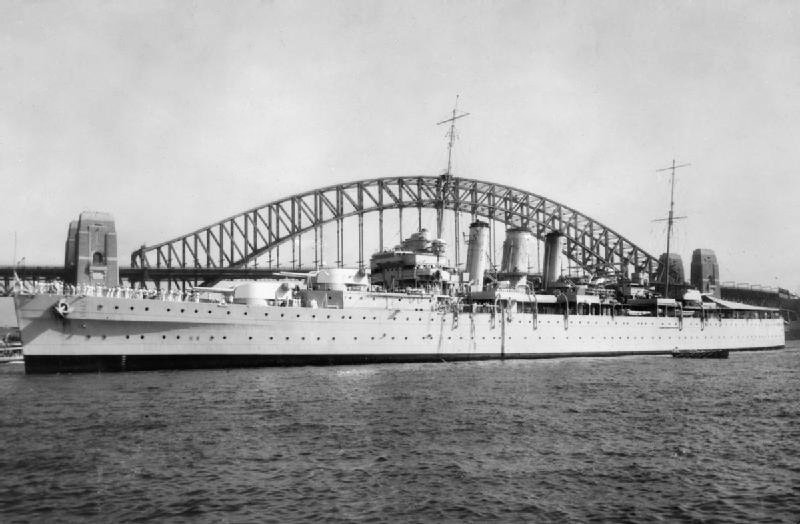
- HMS Dorsetshire in front of the Sydney Harbour Bridge in 1938.

History

United Kingdom
- Name: Dorsetshire
- Namesake: Dorset
- Builder: Portsmouth Dockyard
- Laid down: 21 September 1927
- Launched: 29 January 1929
- Commissioned: 30 September 1930
- Motto: "Pro Patria Et Comitatu" (For Country and County)
- Fate: Sunk by Japanese air attack, 5 April 1942

General characteristics
- Class & type: County-class heavy cruiser
- Displacement: Standard: 10,035 long tons (10,196 t); Full load: 13,420 long tons (13,640 t)
- Length: 632 ft 9 in (192.86 m)
- Beam: 66 ft (20 m)
- Draught: 18 ft (5.5 m)
- Installed power: 8 × boilers; 80,000 shp (59,660 kW)
- Propulsion: 4 × Parsons geared or Brown Curtis steam turbines; 4 × screw propellers
- Speed: 31.5 knots (58.3 km/h; 36.2 mph)
- Range: 12,000 nmi (22,000 km; 14,000 mi) at 12 knots (22 km/h; 14 mph)
- Complement: 653
- Armament: 8 × 8 in (203 mm) Mk VIII guns; 8 × QF 4 in (102 mm) dual-purpose guns; 24 × 2-pounder pom-pom anti-aircraft guns; 8 × 21 in (533 mm) torpedo tubes
- Armour: Side: 1 to 4 in (25 to 102 mm); Turrets: 1 in
- Aircraft carried: 2 × Supermarine Walrus floatplanes (operated by 700 Naval Air Squadron)
- Aviation facilities: 1 × catapult

HMS Dorsetshire (pennant number 40) was a County-class heavy cruiser of the British Royal Navy, named after the English county, now usually known as Dorset. The ship was a member of the Norfolk sub-class, of which Norfolk was the only other unit; the County class comprised a further eleven ships in two other sub-classes. Dorsetshire was built at the Portsmouth Dockyard; her keel was laid in September 1927, she was launched in January 1929, and was completed in September 1930. Dorsetshire was armed with a main battery of eight 8 in (203 mm) guns, and had a top speed of 31.5 knots (58.3 km/h; 36.2 mph).

Dorsetshire served initially in the Atlantic Fleet in the early 1930s, before moving to become the flagship of the Commander-in-Chief, Africa in 1933, and then to the China Station in late 1935. She remained there until the outbreak of the Second World War in September 1939, when she was transferred to the South Atlantic. There, she reinforced the search for the German heavy cruiser Admiral Graf Spee. In late May 1941, Dorsetshire took part in the final engagement with the battleship Bismarck, which ended when Dorsetshire was ordered to close and torpedo the crippled German battleship. She joined searches for the heavy cruiser Admiral Hipper in August and the auxiliary cruiser Atlantis in November.

In March 1942, Dorsetshire was transferred to the Eastern Fleet to support British forces in the recently opened Pacific Theatre of the war. At the end of the month, the Japanese fast carrier task force—the Kido Butai—launched the Indian Ocean raid. On 5 April, Japanese aircraft spotted Dorsetshire and her sister Cornwall while en route to Colombo; a force of dive bombers then attacked the two ships and sank them. More than 1,100 men were rescued the next day, out of a combined crew of over 1,500.

== Description ==
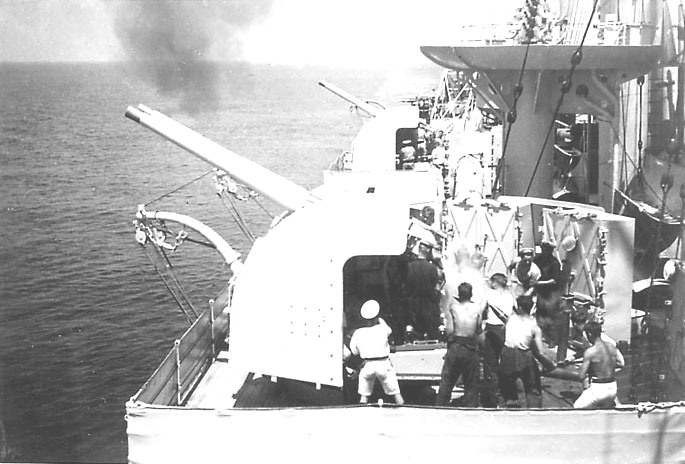
Dorsetshire's twin 4-inch guns, installed in 1937

Dorsetshire was at maximum 632 ft 9 in (192.86 m) long overall, and had a beam of 66 ft (20 m) and a draught of 18 ft (5.5 m). She displaced 9,925–9,975 long tons (10,084–10,135 t) at standard displacement, in compliance with the tonnage restriction of the Washington Naval Treaty, and up to 13,425 long tons (13,640 t) at full load. Dorsetshire was propelled by four Parsons steam turbines that drove four screw propellers. Steam was provided by eight oil-fired 3-drum water-tube boilers. The turbines were rated at 80,000 shp (60,000 kW) and produced a top speed of 32.3 knots (59.8 km/h; 37.2 mph). The ship had a capacity of 3,210 t (3,160 long tons; 3,540 short tons) of fuel oil as built, which provided a cruising radius of 12,500 nautical miles (23,200 km; 14,400 mi) at a speed of 12 knots (22 km/h; 14 mph). She had a crew of 710 officers and enlisted men.

Dorsetshire was armed with a main battery of eight BL 8 in (203 mm) Mk VIII 50-cal. guns in four twin turrets, in two superfiring pairs forward and aft. As built, the cruiser had a secondary battery that included four 4 in (102 mm) dual-purpose guns (DP) in single mounts. She also carried four QF 2-pounder anti-aircraft guns, also in single mounts. Her armament was rounded out by eight 21 in (533 mm) torpedo tubes mounted in two quadruple launchers.

Unlike most heavy cruisers, the County-class cruisers dispensed with traditional belt armour and used 1 in (25 mm) side plating to protect the hulls against shell fragments only. The ammunition magazines received 4 in (102 mm) of armour plate on the sides. The gun turrets and their supporting barbettes also received only 1 in splinter protection.

In 1931, Dorsetshire began to carry a seaplane; a catapult was installed the following year to allow her to launch the aircraft while underway. In 1937, her secondary battery was overhauled. Eight QF 4-inch Mk XVI DP guns in twin turrets replaced the single mounts, and the single 2-pounders were replaced with eight twin-mounts. During the Second World War, her anti-aircraft battery was strengthened by the addition of nine 20 mm (0.79 in) guns.

== Service history ==
=== Pre-war ===
Dorsetshire was laid down at the Portsmouth Dockyard on 21 September 1927 and was launched on 21 January 1929. After completing fitting-out work on 30 September 1930 she was commissioned into the Royal Navy. Upon commissioning, Dorsetshire became the flagship of the 2nd Cruiser Squadron. In 1931, she was part of the Atlantic Fleet during the Invergordon Mutiny. During the incident, some of her men initially refused to assemble for duty but after an hour and a half, the ship's officers had restored order and no further unrest troubled Dorsetshire during the mutiny. From 1933–1935, she served as the flagship for the Commander-in-Chief, Africa; she was replaced by Amphion. By September 1935, Dorsetshire was assigned to the China Station. From 1–4 February 1937, Dorsetshire, the aircraft carrier Hermes and the cruiser Cumberland participated in an exercise to test the defences of Singapore against a hypothetical Japanese attack.

=== Second World War ===
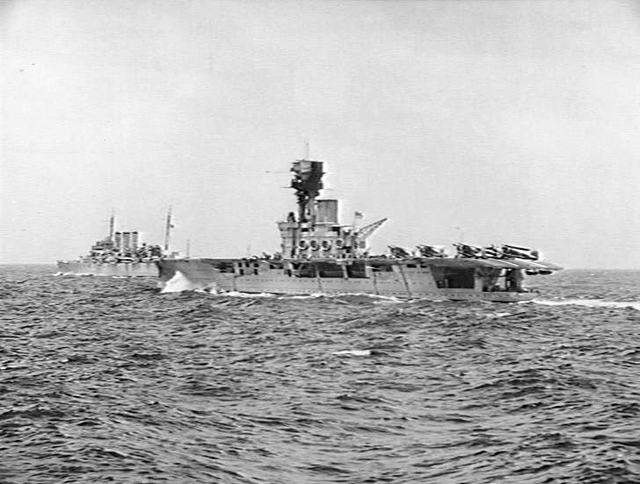
Dorsetshire (left distance) and Hermes (centre) underway in June 1940

At the start of the Second World War in September 1939, Dorsetshire was still on the China Station. In October, Dorsetshire—with other Royal Navy ships—was sent to South American waters in pursuit of the German heavy cruiser Admiral Graf Spee, which was attacking British merchant traffic in the area. Dorsetshire was assigned with her sister ship Cornwall and the aircraft carrier Eagle. Dorsetshire had just arrived in Simonstown, South Africa, from Colombo on 9 December, with orders to proceed to Tristan da Cunha and then to Port Stanley in the Falkland Islands to relieve Exeter. After departing Simonstown, she received the order to join the hunt for Admiral Graf Spee. She left South Africa on 13 December in company with the cruiser Shropshire and was in transit on 17 December when the Germans scuttled Admiral Graf Spee following the Battle of the River Plate.

Exeter had been badly damaged in the battle with Admiral Graf Spee, and Dorsetshire escorted her back to Britain in January 1940, before returning to South American waters to search for German supply ships. On 11 February, her reconnaissance aircraft spotted the German supply freighter Wakama 12 nmi (22 km; 14 mi) off the coast of Brazil, which was promptly scuttled by her crew. Dorsetshire arrived on the scene shortly thereafter, picked up ten officers and thirty-five crewmen and sank Wakama to prevent her from being a navigational hazard. The following month, the President of Panama, Augusto Samuel Boyd, sent a formal complaint to the British government protesting against Dorsetshire's violation of the Pan-American Security Zone in the Wakama incident.

In May, Dorsetshire underwent a short refit in Simonstown, before returning to Britain for a more thorough overhaul. On 23 June, she set out from Freetown to watch the French battleship Richelieu, which left Dakar for Casablanca two days later. While en route, Dorsetshire rendezvoused with the aircraft carrier Hermes off Dakar. Richelieu was ordered to return to Dakar by Admiral François Darlan later that day and she arrived on 27 June. Dorsetshire continued to monitor the French Navy off Dakar and on 3 July, the French submarines Le Glorieux and Le Héros attempted to intercept her. Dorsetshire was able to evade their attacks through high-speed manoeuvres. On 5 July, Hermes and the Australian cruiser HMAS Australia joined her there. On 7 July, the squadron was ordered to issue an ultimatum to the French fleet, to either surrender and be interned under British control or to scuttle their ships; the French refused, so a fast sloop was sent in to drop depth charges under the stern of Richelieu to disable her screws.

On 4 September, she was dry-docked at Durban and on the 20th she arrived back in Simonstown. She sailed for Sierra Leone the next day. Operating in the Indian Ocean, on 18 November she bombarded Zante in Italian Somaliland. On 18 December she departed to join the search for the heavy cruiser Admiral Scheer, which had recently sunk the British refrigerator ship Duquesa in the South Atlantic. The British were unsuccessful in their search and Admiral Scheer remained at large.

==== Bismarck ====
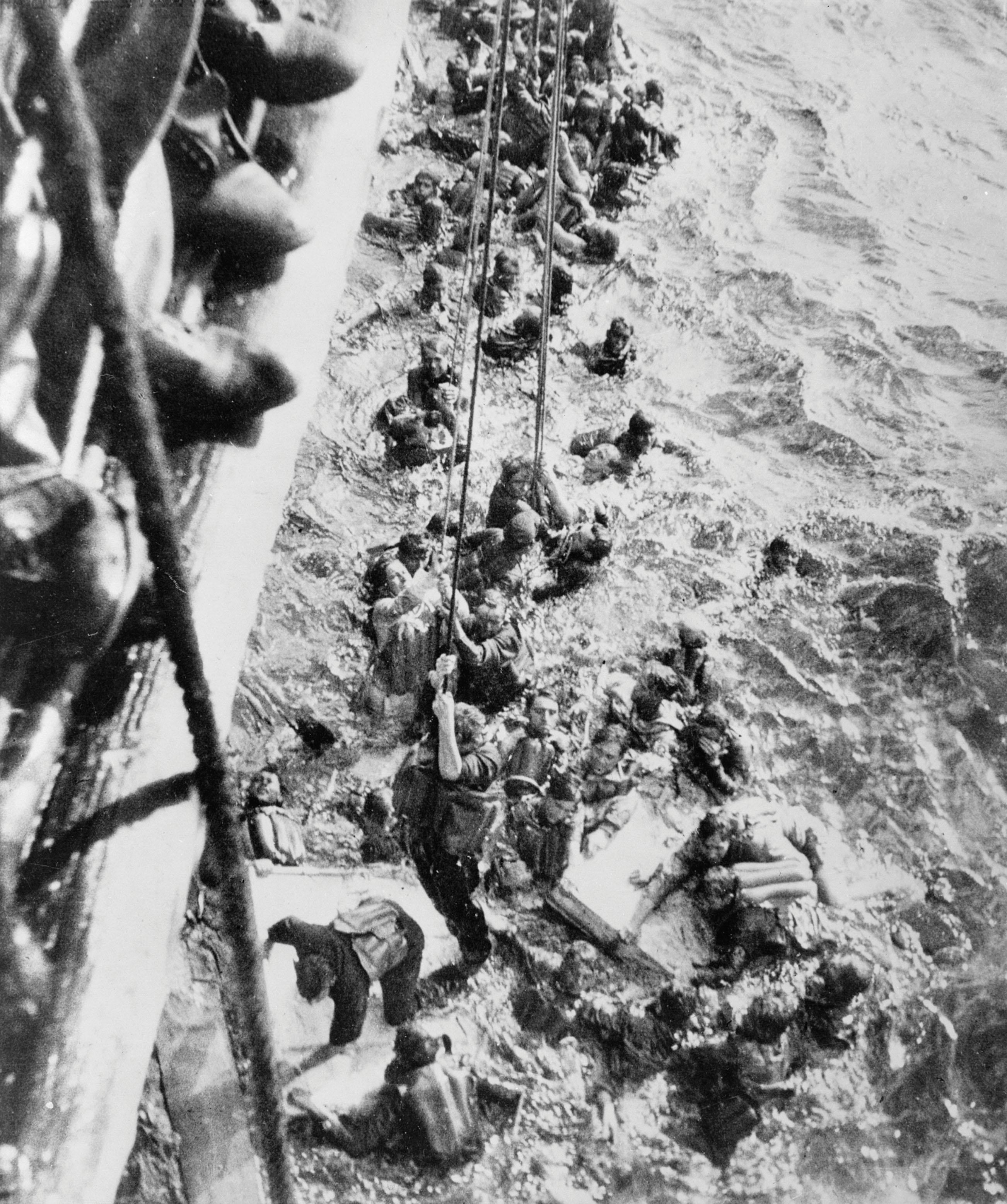
Survivors from Bismarck are pulled aboard Dorsetshire on 27 May 1941.

By May 1941, Dorsetshire had been assigned to Force H, along with the aircraft carrier Ark Royal, the battlecruiser Renown, and the light cruiser Sheffield. Dorsetshire was at that time commanded by Captain Benjamin Martin. Late in the month, the German battleship Bismarck and heavy cruiser Prinz Eugen broke out into the North Atlantic to attack convoys sailing for Britain, and Dorsetshire was one of the ships deployed to hunt the German raiders. Dorsetshire had been escorting convoy SL74 from Sierra Leone to the UK on 26 May, when she received the order to leave the convoy and join the search for Bismarck; she was some 360 nmi (670 km; 410 mi) south of Bismarck's location. Dorsetshire steamed at top speed, though heavy seas later in the night forced her to reduce to 25 knots (46 km/h; 29 mph) and later to 20 knots (37 km/h; 23 mph). By 08:33, Dorsetshire encountered the destroyer Cossack, which had been engaging Bismarck throughout the night. The German battleship's gun flashes could be seen, only 6 nmi (11 km; 6.9 mi) away, by 08:50.

Shortly thereafter, Dorsetshire took part in Bismarck's last battle; after the battleships Rodney and King George V neutralised Bismarck's main battery early in the engagement, Dorsetshire and other warships—including her sister Norfolk—closed in to join the attack. Dorsetshire opened fire at a range of 20,000 yd (18,000 m), but poor visibility forced her to check her fire for lengthy periods. In the course of the engagement, she fired 254 shells from her main battery. In the final moments of the battle, she was ordered to move closer and torpedo Bismarck and fired three torpedoes, two of which hit the crippled battleship. The Germans had by this time detonated scuttling charges, which with the damage inflicted by the British, caused Bismarck to rapidly sink at 10:40.

Dorsetshire and the destroyer Maori then moved in to pick up survivors. Martin had ropes lowered down the sides of the ship so the men in the water could climb aboard. A reported U-boat sighting forced the two ships to break off the rescue effort. Historians Holger Herwig and David Bercuson state that only 110 men were rescued: 85 aboard Dorsetshire and 25 aboard Maori. Historian Angus Konstam, however, writes that his research indicated a total of 116 saved, 86 on Dorsetshire (one of whom died), 25 on Maori, 3 rescued by U-74 and a further 2 picked up by the German weather ship Sachsenwald.

Rodney, King George V and the destroyers Sikh, Zulu and Cossack had meanwhile begun to steam north-west to return to Scapa Flow. After abandoning the rescue effort, Dorsetshire and Maori caught up with the rest of the fleet shortly after 12:00. Late that night, as the fleet steamed off Britain, Dorsetshire was detached to stop in the Tyne. She had suffered no casualties in the battle with Bismarck.

==== Deployment to South Africa and the Indian Ocean ====
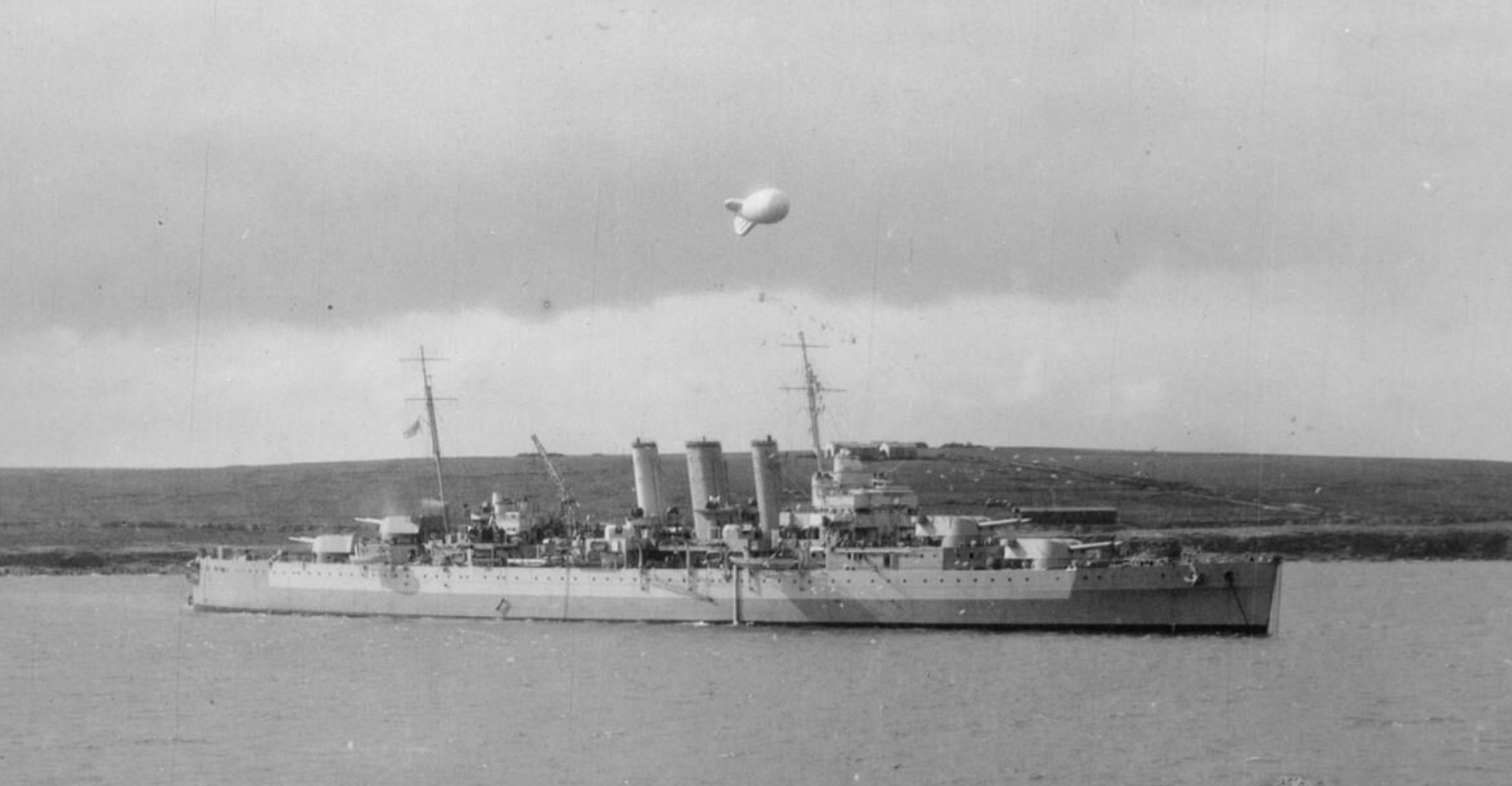
Dorsetshire at anchor in Scapa Flow in August 1941

In late August, Dorsetshire participated in the search for the heavy cruiser Admiral Hipper. Dorsetshire, Eagle and the light cruiser Newcastle left Freetown on 29 August, though they were unable to locate the German raider. On 4 November, Dorsetshire and the auxiliary cruiser Canton, were sent to investigate reports of a German surface raider in the South Atlantic but neither ship found anything. In November–December, WS-24, a convoy of 10 troop transport ships, steamed out from Halifax, Canada en route to Basra, Iraq. After arriving in Cape Town on 9 December, Dorsetshire took over the escort duties and the convoy was diverted to Bombay, where it arrived on 24 December.

Dorsetshire was deployed in November, to join the search for the German commerce raider Atlantis, that had been attacking Allied shipping off the coast of Africa. Admiral Algernon Willis formed Task Force 3, with Dorsetshire and Devonshire to patrol likely refuelling locations for Atlantis. On 1 December, Dorsetshire intercepted the German supply ship Python, based on Ultra intelligence. The German ship was refuelling a pair of U-boats— UA and U-68—in the South Atlantic. The U-boats dived while Python tried to flee. UA fired five torpedoes at Dorsetshire but all missed her due to her evasive manoeuvres. Dorsetshire fired a salvo to stop Python and the latter's crew abandoned the ship, after detonating scuttling charges. Dorsetshire left the Germans in their boats, since the U-boats still presented too much of a threat for the British to pick up the Germans.

==== Loss ====
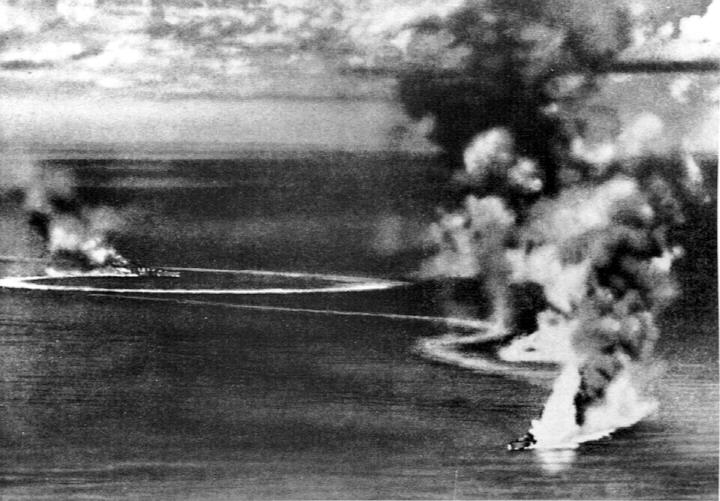
Dorsetshire and Cornwall under heavy air attack by Japanese dive bombers on 5 April 1942

In 1942, Dorsetshire, under the command of Augustus Agar, was assigned to the Eastern Fleet in the Indian Ocean. In March, Dorsetshire was assigned to Force A, which was commanded by Admiral James Somerville, with the battleship Warspite and the carriers Indomitable and Formidable. Somerville received reports of an impending Japanese attack in the Indian Ocean—the Indian Ocean raid—and so he put his fleet to sea on 31 March. Having not encountered any hostile forces by 4 April, he withdrew to refuel. Dorsetshire and her sister ship Cornwall were sent to Colombo to replenish their fuel.

The next day, she and Cornwall were spotted by reconnaissance aircraft from the heavy cruiser Tone. The two British cruisers were attacked by a force of 53 Aichi D3A2 "Val" dive bombers 320 km (200 mi) southwest of Ceylon. In the span of about eight minutes, Dorsetshire was hit by ten 250 lb (110 kg) and 550 lb (250 kg) bombs and several near misses; she sank stern first at about 13:50. One of the bombs detonated an ammunition magazine and contributed to her rapid sinking. Cornwall was hit eight times and sank bow first about ten minutes later. Between the two ships, 1,122 men out of a total of 1,546 were picked up by the cruiser Enterprise and the destroyers Paladin and Panther the next day.
