= HMS Paladin (G69) =

P-class destroyer converted to Type 16 frigate of the Royal Navy

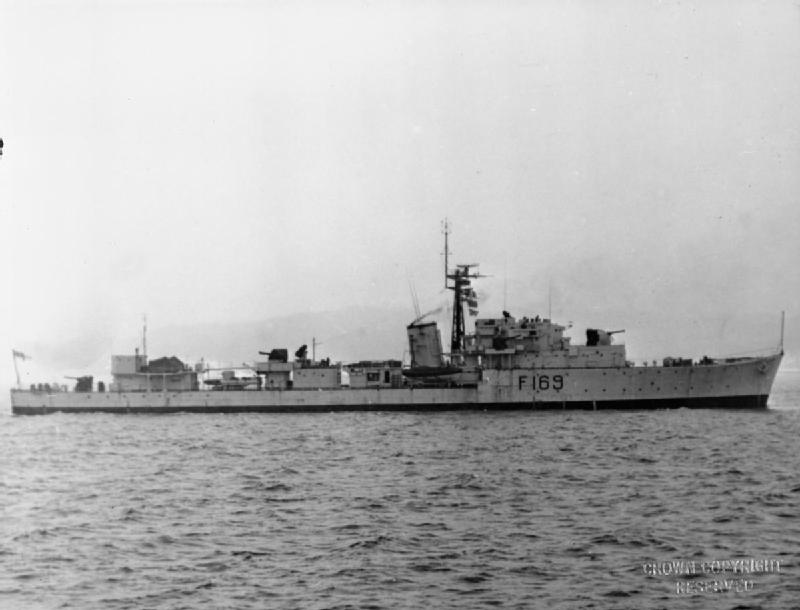
- Paladin in 1954

History

United Kingdom
- Name: HMS Paladin
- Ordered: 2 October 1939
- Builder: John Brown
- Laid down: 22 July 1940
- Launched: 11 June 1941
- Commissioned: December 1941
- Decommissioned: June 1961
- Identification: Pennant number: G69, later F169
- Honours and awards: Diego Suarez 1942; Sicily 1943; Mediterranean 1943; Burma 1944–45
- Fate: Scrapped in 1962
- Badge: On a Field Blue, a sword erect White, pommel and hilt Gold enfiled with two spurs in Saltire also Gold.

General characteristics as P–class
- Class & type: P-class destroyer
- Displacement: 1,690 tons (1,717 tonnes) standard; 1,640 tons (1,666 tonnes); 2,250 tons (2,286 tonnes) full load
- Length: 345 ft (105 m) o/a
- Beam: 35 ft (11 m)
- Draught: 9 ft (2.7 m)
- Propulsion: 2 × Admiralty 3-drum water-tube boilers, Parsons geared steam turbines, 40,000 shp on 2 shafts
- Speed: 36.75 knots (68.06 km/h)
- Range: 3,850 nautical miles (7,130 km) at 20 knots (37 km/h)
- Complement: 176
- Armament: 5 × QF 4 in Mk.V (102 mm L/45), single mounts HA Mk.III; 4 × QF 2 pdr Mk.VIII (40 mm L/39), quad mount Mk.VII; Up to 6 × QF 20 mm Oerlikon, single mount P Mk.III; 4 (1×4) tubes for 21-inch (533 mm) torpedoes, Mk.IX; 4 × throwers and 2 × racks for 70 depth charges

General characteristics as Type 16 class
- Class & type: Type 16 frigate
- Displacement: 1,800 long tons (1,800 t) standard; 2,300 long tons (2,300 t) full load
- Length: 362 ft 9 in (110.57 m) o/a
- Beam: 37 ft 9 in (11.51 m)
- Draught: 14 ft 6 in (4.42 m)
- Propulsion: 2 × Admiralty 3-drum boilers; Steam turbines, 40,000 shp; 2 shafts
- Speed: 32 knots (37 mph; 59 km/h) full load
- Complement: 175
- Sensors & processing systems: Type 293Q target indication Radar; Type 974 navigation Radar; Type 1010 Cossor Mark 10 IFF; Type 146B search Sonar; Type 147 depth finder Sonar; Type 162 target classification Sonar; Type 174 attack Sonar
- Armament: 1 × twin QF 4-inch (102 mm) gun Mk XVI; 1 × twin 40 mm Bofors gun Mk.5; 5 × single 40 mm Bofors gun Mk.9; 2 × Squid A/S mortar; 1 × quad 21-inch (533 mm) tubes for Mk.9 torpedoes

HMS Paladin was a P-class destroyer of the Royal Navy that served in the Second World War. She was built by John Brown and Co. Ltd., Clydebank. She saw action in the Mediterranean and Far East. After the war she was converted into a type 16 frigate and was eventually scrapped in 1962.

== Design ==
The P-class (and the preceding O-class) destroyers were designed prior to the outbreak of the Second World War to meet the Royal Navy's need for large numbers of destroyers in the event of war occurring. They were an intermediate between the large destroyers designed for fleet operations (such as the Tribal-class) and the smaller and slower Hunt-class escort destroyers. It was originally planned for both classes of destroyers to have a main gun armament of 4.7 inch (120 mm ) guns, but supply problems with the 4.7 inch mounts resulted in the decision to complete the eight P-class ships with 4-inch (102 mm) dual purpose (capable of both anti-ship and anti-aircraft fire) guns.

Paladin was 345 ft (105.16 m) long overall, 337 ft (102.72 m) at the waterline and 328 ft 9 in (100.20 m) between perpendiculars, with a beam of 35 ft (10.67 m) and a draught of 9 ft (2.74 m) mean and 13 ft 6 in (4.11 m) full load. Displacement was 1,550 long tons (1,570 t) standard and 2,250 long tons (2,290 t) full load. Two Admiralty three-drum boilers fed steam at 300 psi (2,100 kPa) and 620 °F (327 °C) to two sets of Parsons single-reduction geared steam turbines which drove two propeller shafts. The machinery was rated at 40,000 shp (30,000 kW) giving a maximum speed of 36.75 kn (42.3 mph; 68.1 km/h), corresponding to 33 kn (38 mph; 61 km/h) at deep load 500 long tons (510 t) of oil was carried, giving a radius of 3,850 nmi (4,430 mi; 7,130 km) at 20 kn (23 mph; 37 km/h). The ship had a crew of 176 officers and men.

Paladin had a main gun armament of five 4-inch (102 mm) QF Mark V anti-aircraft guns in single mounts. (Note: Mark III guns according to English.) Close-in anti-aircraft armament of one quadruple 2-pounder "pom-pom" mount together with four single Oerlikon 20 mm cannon, with two on the bridge wings and two further aft abreast the searchlight platform. A single quadruple 21-inch (533 mm) torpedo tubes was carried, while a second bank of four tubes was later added instead of one of the 4-inch guns. Four depth charge throwers were fitted, with 70 depth charges carried.

== Construction and service ==
Paladin was laid down at John Brown's Clydebank shipyard on 22 July 1940, launched on 11 June 1941 and completed on 12 December of that year.

=== First time in the Far East ===
Paladin was allocated to the Eastern Fleet which was then under the command of Admiral Sir James Somerville, leaving Greenock on 17 February 1942, arriving in Colombo via the Cape on 24 March, where she joined the 12th Destroyer Flotilla. At the end of March, warned of a prospective raid by Japanese carrier forces, Summerville, took the Eastern Fleet to sea, dividing it into two main part, with Paladin attached to the fast group, with the battleship Warspite and the aircraft carriers Indomitable and Formidable. On 5 April, the Japanese force struck at Colombo, and later that day, Japanese aircraft spotted the British heavy cruisers Cornwall and Dorsetshire, which were sunk by Japanese dive bombers. Paladin, together with the destroyer Panther and the cruiser Enterprise rescued 1122 survivors (Note: 1222 according to Shores et al..) from the two ships, many of whom were in the water for 30 hours in a shark-infested sea.

In the first week of May 1942, Paladin took part in Operation Ironclad, the capture of Diego Suarez, Madagascar, from Vichy French forces, forming part of the screen for the heavy ships, and after resistance at Diego Suarez collapsed on 7 May, entered Diego Suarez harbour with Panther, the battleship Ramillies and the cruiser Hermione.

=== First time in the Mediterranean ===
Following the completion of Operation Ironclad, Paladin was transferred to the Mediterranean Fleet, arriving at Alexandria on 13 June 1942. Shortly after arrival in the Mediterranean, she formed part of the covering force for Operation Vigorous, the passage of a convoy to Malta from Alexandria; at the same time, Operation Harpoon, the passage of another convoy from the west, sailed from Gibraltar. While the latter got through, the Vigorous convoy was prevented from doing so by the appearance of the Italian battle fleet, coupled with heavy air attacks. Paladin, together with the cruisers Dido and Euryalus and the destroyers Pakenham, Javelin and Jervis, bombarded Mersa Matruh on 19 July 1942. On 14 September, Paladin, along with the destroyers Pakenham, Javelin and Jervis and the cruiser Dido, bombarded the Daba area.

Paladin also took part in other Mediterranean operations, including the passage of convoys to Malta from Egypt after the relief of the island in November, and providing anti-aircraft protection for Alexandria. On 17 February 1943, Paladin was part of the escort of a convoy between Tripoli and Alexandria. The convoy was off Derna, Libya, when it was spotted by the German submarine U-205. Paladin detected the submarine on her sonar and dropped a pattern of five depth charges. These badly damaged the submarine, forcing its commander to surface the submarine. On surfacing U-205 was attacked by a Bisley aircraft of 15 Squadron of the South African Air Force, and came under heavy fire from Paladin and the destroyer Jervis, forcing her crew to quickly abandon ship and disrupting attempts to scuttle the submarine. Paladin and Jervis picked up 42 survivors, while a boarding party from Paladin attempted to recover codebooks from U-205, with the submarine's short signal code book and bigram tables recovered. The corvette Gloxinia took U-205 in tow, but the submarine sank under tow before reaching the shore.

From early 1943, the British intensified attempts to stop supply traffic from Italy to the German and Italian forces in North Africa, with operations including patrols by destroyers. On 8 March 1943, Paladin and Pakenham sank several ferry barges near Pantellaria. In the early morning of 16 April 1943, Paladin and Pakenham were on a sweep in the Sicilian narrows when they met an Italian convoy with a close escort of two torpedo boats, Cigno and Cassiopea. The Italian torpedo boats engaged the two British destroyers while the rest of the convoy escaped. In the ensuing action, the Battle of the Cigno Convoy, Cigno was sunk and Cassiopea damaged, but Pakenham was hit several times by Italian shells which cut her steam lines and flooded her engine room. Paladin took her in tow, but after being attacked by enemy aircraft, Paladin was ordered to scuttle Pakenham, and sank her with torpedoes.

On 30 April, Paladin and the destroyer Nubian sank the transport Fauna off Sicily and on the night of 3/4 May, Paladin, with Nubian and the destroyer Petard, on another sweep from Malta, sank the Italian torpedo boat Perseo and the merchant ship Campobasso. On 7 May, Paladin, with Jervis and Nubian bombarded Kelibia, the most easterly point of the Cape Bon peninsula. This bombardment was repeated on 9 May.

Paladin was among the ships which bombarded Pantellaria on 1 June, on the night of 2/3 June and on 5 June 1943, prior to the main assault on that island on 11 June, when Paladin escorted the landing force. The island surrendered without further fighting.

=== Sicily ===
Paladin formed part of the reserve covering force, Force Z, that waited to the West of Sicily during Operation Husky, the Anglo American invasion of Sicily on 10 July 1943. She subsequently took part in various other operations off the Italian coast, bombarding Vibo Valentia on 13 August along with the cruisers Aurora and Penelope and the destroyer Jervis, and Scalea on 17 August, with Euryalus, Penelope and Jervis.

=== Italy ===
In September 1943, she took part in operations connected with the invasion of the Italian mainland and the landings at Taranto, Operation Slapstick on 9 September, and after the fast minelayer Abdiel was sunk by a mine in Taranto harbour, Paladin served as headquarters ship and guardship at Taranto. On 26 November, Paladin, together with the cruiser Orion and the destroyers Teazer and Troubridge shelled targets north of the Garigliano river. Paladin also carried out bombardments in the Gulf of Gaeta on 1 December.

=== The Far East ===
In January 1944, Paladin returned to eastern waters as part of a major reinforcement of the Eastern Fleet, joining the 16th Destroyer Flotilla, arriving in Trincomalee on 28 January, escorting the battleships Queen Elizabeth, Valiant and the aircraft carrier Illustrious.

On 12 February 1944, Paladin, together with Petard and the cruiser Hawkins were escorting the troop convoy KR 8 from Kilindini to Ceylon (Sri Lanka) through the One and a Half Degree Channel in the Maldives, when the Japanese submarine I-27 torpedoed and sank the troop ship Khedive Ismail, with heavy loss of life (up to 1300 were killed). The two destroyers retaliated with depth charges, and when I-27 came to the surface, Paladin attempted to ram the Japanese submarine, but was badly damaged, with one of I-27' s hydroplanes tearing an 80 feet (24 m) long and up to 2 feet (0.61 m) wide gash in Paladin's hull causing heavy flooding. I-27 was eventually torpedoed and sunk by Petard. The flooding meant that Paladin was in danger of sinking, with her crew jettisoning topweight, including the ship's torpedoes and transferring half her crew, and the survivors she had picked up from Khedive Ismail to Petard in order to control her list before being towed by Petard to Addu Atoll.

After temporary repair at Addu Atoll, Paladin was ordered to Simonstown in South Africa, where she arrived on 22 March 1944 to receive full repairs and a refit. Departing from Durban on 29 July, she returned to escort duties in the Indian Ocean, via Diego Suarez (Antsiranana), Madagascar and Dar es Salaam.

=== The Far East revisited ===
In January 1945, Paladin joined Force 65 for the landing of 500 Royal Marines on Cheduba island on 26 January, providing gunfire support for the landings, although the Marines found that the island was deserted. In February she took part in Operation Block, to prevent the escape of Japanese troops from Ramree Island. On 11 February 1945, Paladin and Pathfinder were attacked by Japanese fighter-bombers off Ramree Island. While Paladin received only minor splinter damage, a near miss badly damaged Pathfinder, which was later written off as not worth repairing.

In March 1945, Paladin's duties included escorting troopships, and on 26–30 April took part in Operation Bishop, a bombardment of Car Nicobar and Port Blair in the Andaman and Nicobar Islands by the heavy ships of the Eastern Fleet, with Paladin escorting the oiler Olwen. In May 1945, she took part in Operation Dracula, the Anglo-Indian landings at Rangoon. On 10 May, when the Haguro was sighted in the Malacca Strait, Paladin was among the ships that left Trincomalee to intercept the Japanese cruiser. Haguro was eventually sunk by other destroyers on 16 May. On 5 June Paladin took part in sweeps in the Nicobar Channel, with Paladin and Penn sinking a Japanese landing craft off Sumatra.

In the last week of July, Paladin took part in Operation Livery, the object of which was removing mines near Phuket Island and the Malay Peninsula and bombarding appropriate targets.

At the end of August, after the Japanese surrender, Paladin was included in the force that proceeded to Penang, which was occupied on 3 September 1945 in Operation Jurist. A platoon of crew members was sent ashore to help maintain order and prevent looting in George Town after the Japanese withdrawal.

=== Home, conversion and scrapping ===
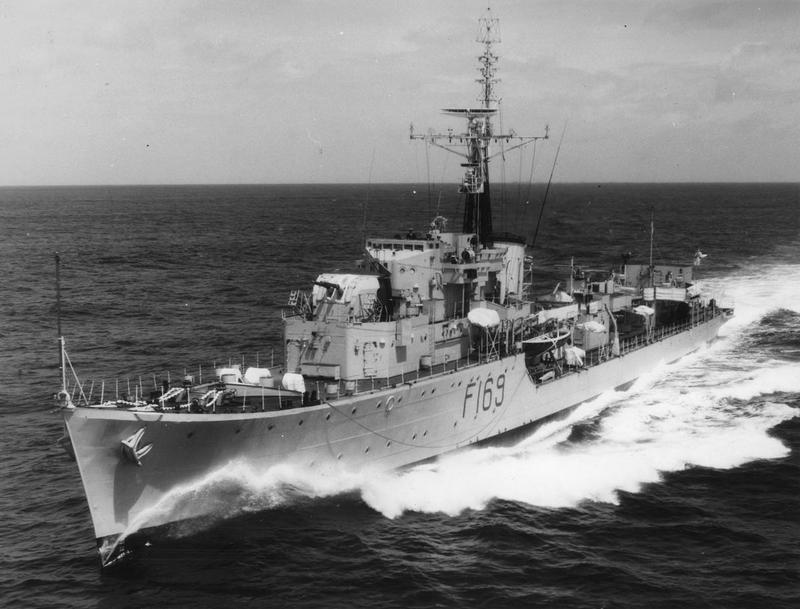
Paladin in 1958 after conversion to a Type 16 Frigate (IWM)

Paladin left the East Indies Station in October 1945, arriving in Portsmouth in November 1945 and was placed in reserve. In January 1946, she replaced the old destroyer Brilliant as submarine target ship. On 24 August 1946, the Dutch motorship Nigerstroom was in collision with the French freighter Ernest L. Dawson in the English Channel. Paladin towed Nigerstroom to Spithead, leaving the damaged ship in the care of two tugs while the destroyer took 40 passengers from Nigerstroom to Portsmouth. Paladin continued serving as a target ship until March 1947 when she was laid up at Harwich in Category B2 reserve. (Note: Category B2 reserve meant that the ship was to be preserved for possible service in a future emergency, but would require an extensive refit before entering service.) In September 1951, Paladin was refitted at Chatham, remaining in Category II reserve (Note: Category II reserve were dehumidified and held at 30 days readiness.) at Chatham after completion of this refit.

In 1953–1954, Paladin was converted to a Type 16 fast anti-submarine frigate at Rosyth Dockyard. The ship's main gun armament was removed and replaced by a single QF 4-inch naval gun Mk XVI mount directed by a Simple Tachymetric Director, while close-in anti-aircraft armament consisted of five 40mm Bofors, with one twin Mk 5 mount amidships, and three single Mk 7 mounts on the bridge wings and on the ship's quarterdeck. Anti submarine armament consisted of two Squid ASW mortars, while a single quadruple 21-inch torpedo-tube mount was retained, giving an anti-surface ship capability, although the hoped for anti-submarine homing torpedoes failed to become available. A Type 293Q surface/air search radar and Type 974 navigation sonar was fitted, while the sonar outfit consisted of Type 146B search, Type 147P depth finder, Type 162 target classification and Type 174 Squid control. After completion of this refit, Paladin returned to reserve. Paladin was converted to a minelayer in 1957, with the remaining torpedo tubes and three of the Bofors guns removed to allow up to 30 mines to be carried. Displacement was now 1,800 long tons (1,829 t) standard and 2,300 long tons (2,337 t) full load.

On 10 January 1958, Paladin commissioned as part of the Nore Local Squadron, with duties including fishery protection patrols near Iceland. The Queen and the Duke of Edinburgh paid a state visit to the Netherlands in the royal yacht Britannia in March 1958, Paladin was one of the escorts for the passage to Amsterdam. In May the same year Paladin fired a 21 gun salute when she and two other frigates took over escort duties outside French territorial waters from the French destroyer Jauréguiberry.

She was placed on the disposal list in 1961, and arrived at Dunston, Tyne and Wear for scrapping by Clayton and Davie on 22 October 1962.

== Battle honours ==
Paladin was awarded the following battle honours: 'Diego Suarez 1942', 'Mediterranean 1943', 'Sicily 1943' and 'Burma 1944–45'.
