= O and P-class destroyer =

Class of destroyers of the Royal Navy

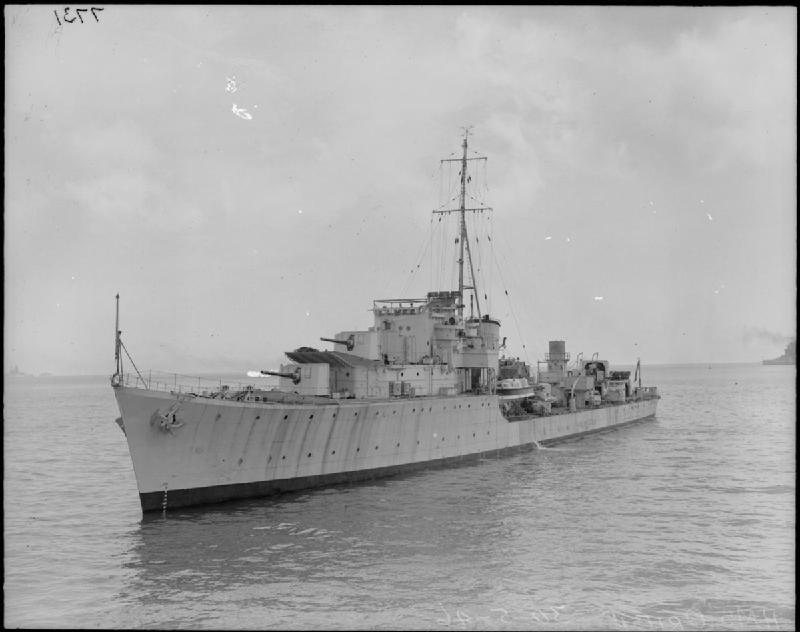
- HMS Oribi in 1946

Class overview
- Name: O and P class
- Operators: Royal Navy; Pakistan Navy; Turkish Navy
- Preceded by: L and M class
- Succeeded by: Q and R class
- Subclasses: 4 inch O, 4.7 inch O, P
- Completed: 16
- Lost: 4
- Retired: 12

General characteristics P class
- Type: Destroyer
- Displacement: 1,690 tons (1,717 tonnes) standard; 1,640 tons (1,666 tonnes); 2,250 tons (2,286 tonnes) full load
- Length: 345 ft (105 m) o/a
- Beam: 35 ft (10.7 m)
- Draught: 9 ft (2.7 m)
- Propulsion: 2 x Admiralty 3-drum water-tube boilers, Parsons geared steam turbines, 40,000 shp on 2 shafts
- Speed: 36.75 kt
- Range: 3,850 nmi at 20 kt
- Complement: 176 (228 as flotilla leader)
- Armament: 5 × QF 4 in Mk.V (102 mm L/45), single mounts HA Mk.III; 4 × QF 2 pdr Mk.VIII (40 mm L/39), quad mount Mk.VII; Up to 6 x QF 20 mm Oerlikon, single mount P Mk.III; 4 (1x4) tubes for 21 inch torpedoes Mk.IX; 4 × throwers and 2 x racks for 70 depth charges

General characteristics (4.7 inch O class)
- Displacement: 1,610 tons (1,636 tonnes); 2,270 tons (2,306 tonnes) full load
- Complement: 176 (217 in leader)
- Armament: 4 × QF 4.7-inch (120-mm) Mk IX guns, single mounts CP Mk.XVIII; 1 × QF 4 in Mk.V (102 mm L/45), mount HA Mk.III; 4 × QF 2 pdr Mk.VIII (40 mm L/39), quad mount Mk.VII; Up to 6 x QF 20 mm Oerlikon, single mount P Mk.III; 4 (1x4) tubes for 21 in torpedoes Mk.IX
- Notes: Other characteristics as per P class

General characteristics (4 inch O class)
- Displacement: 1,540 tons (1,564 tonnes); 2,220 tons (2,255 tonnes) full load
- Armament: 4 × QF 4 in Mk.V (102 mm L/45), single mount HA Mk.III; 4 × QF 2 pdr Mk.VIII (40 mm L/39), quad mount Mk.VII; Up to 6 x QF 20 mm Oerlikon, single mount P Mk.III; 8 (2x4) tubes for 21 in torpedoes Mk.IX; Up to 60 mines (where fitted-for)
- Notes: Other characteristics as per P class

The O and P class was a class of destroyers of the British Royal Navy. Ordered in 1939, they were the first ships in the War Emergency Programme, also known as the 1st and 2nd Emergency Flotilla, respectively. They served as convoy escorts in World War II, and some were subsequently converted to fast second-rate anti-submarine frigates in the 1950s.

== Design ==
The O and P class were based on the hull and machinery of the preceding J class, but with more sheer forward to counter the poor riding qualities of the Js. These ships used the Fuze Keeping Clock HA Fire Control Computer.

=== O class ===
The O-class ships were built in two groups of four. The first group had 4.7 inch guns. They were in low-angle mounts which could elevate to only 40 degrees, and were additionally fitted with a 4-inch anti-aircraft gun in place of one set of torpedo tubes. The second group had 4-inch (102 mm) guns in high-angle mounts and were fitted to act as minelayers; they could be recognized by the flat "beaver tail" stern over which the mines were dropped.

When carrying mines they had to land Y gun, their torpedo tubes and depth charges. The designed anti-aircraft armament was one quadruple QF 2-pounder "pom pom" and a pair of quadruple 0.5-inch Vickers A/A machine guns. The latter proved to be outdated, and were replaced by 20 mm Oerlikon guns as they became available, with a total of six single mounts eventually being carried.

=== P class ===
The P class were repeats of the O class, armed entirely with 4 inch guns, in high-angle mounts fitted with a new tall design of shield which did not require the ships to lose a set of torpedo tubes to take on further AA guns.

== Ships ==
=== O class ===
All ships survived the war. Five of them were involved in the Battle of the Barents Sea, Onslow being badly damaged. After the battle, the ships were refitted with tall lattice masts instead of the normal mast.

Construction data for 4.7-inch-armed ships
| Name | Pennant number | Builder | Laid down | Launched | Completed | Fate |
|---|---|---|---|---|---|---|
| Onslow (Note: Flotilla leader) (ex-Pakenham) | G17 | John Brown & Co., Clydebank | 1 July 1940 | 31 March 1941 | 8 October 1941 | To Pakistan 1949 as Tippu Sultan, sold out |
| Offa | G29 | Fairfield Shipbuilding and Engineering, Govan | 15 January 1940 | 11 March 1941 | 20 September 1941 | To Pakistan 1949 as Tariq, sold for scrap in 1959. |
| Onslaught (ex-Pathfinder) | G04 | Fairfield Shipbuilding and Engineering, Govan | 14 January 1941 | 9 October 1941 | 19 June 1942 | To Pakistan 1951 as Tughril, sold out. |
| Oribi (ex-Observer) | G66 | Fairfield Shipbuilding and Engineering, Govan | 15 January 1940 | 14 January 1941 | 5 July 1941 | To Turkey 1946 as Gayret, sold out. |

Construction data for 4-inch-armed ships
| Name | Pennant number | Builder | Laid down | Launched | Completed | Fate |
|---|---|---|---|---|---|---|
| Obdurate | G39 | William Denny & Bros., Dumbarton | 25 April 1940 | 19 February 1942 | 3 September 1942 | Sold for scrap in 1964 at J Cashmore's, Newport, Monmouthshire. |
| Obedient | G48 | William Denny & Bros., Dumbarton | 22 May 1940 | 30 April 1942 | 30 October 1942 | Sold for scrap - 1964. |
| Opportune | G80 | Thornycroft, Woolston | 28 March 1940 | 21 February 1942 | 14 August 1942 | Sold for scrap - 1955. |
| Orwell | G98 | Thornycroft, Woolston | 20 May 1940 | 2 April 1942 | 17 October 1942 | Converted to Type 16 frigate 1952, sold for scrap – 1965. |

All of the O-class ships with 4-inch armament were fitted for minelaying.

=== P class ===
They served mainly in the Mediterranean, where four ships were lost.

Construction data for 4-inch-armed ships
| Name | Pennant number | Builder | Laid down | Launched | Completed | Fate |
|---|---|---|---|---|---|---|
| Pakenham (Note: Flotilla leader) (ex-Onslow) | G06 | Hawthorn Leslie, Hebburn | 6 February 1940 | 28 January 1941 | 4 February 1942 | Disabled by gunfire from Italian Navy torpedo boats Cassiopea and Cigno off Marsala 16 April 1943 in the Battle of the Cigno Convoy, abandoned and scuttled by sister ship HMS Paladin following the action |
| Paladin | G69 | John Brown & Co., Clydebank | 22 July 1940 | 11 June 1941 | December 1941 | Converted to Type 16 frigate 1954, sold for scrap in 1962 |
| Panther | G41 | Fairfield Shipbuilding and Engineering, Govan | 15 July 1940 | 28 May 1941 | 12 December 1941 | Bombed and sunk by German Junkers Ju 87 'Stuka' aircraft in Scarpanto Strait on 10 September 1943. |
| Partridge | G30 | Fairfield Shipbuilding and Engineering, Govan | 3 June 1940 | 5 August 1941 | 22 February 1942 | Torpedoed by German Submarine U-565 off Oran, 18 December 1942. |
| Pathfinder | G10 | Hawthorn Leslie, Hebburn | 5 March 1940 | 10 April 1941 | 13 April 1942 | On 11 February 1945, Pathfinder was hit by a Japanese bomber off Ramree, and was taken out of service. She was used as an aircraft target, sold for scrap in 1948. |
| Penn | G77 | Vickers Armstrongs, Higher Walker | 26 December 1939 | 12 February 1941 | 10 February 1942 | Sold for scrap - 1949. |
| Petard | G56 | Vickers Armstrongs, Higher Walker | 26 December 1939 | 27 March 1941 | 15 June 1942 | Converted to Type 16 frigate, sold for scrap 1967. |
| Porcupine | G93 | Vickers Armstrongs, Higher Walker | 26 December 1939 | 10 June 1941 | 31 August 1942 | Torpedoed by German submarine U-602 in the Mediterranean on 9 December 1942 which broke her in two; she was never repaired, but hulked as Pork and Pine, sold for scrap, 1947. |

== See also ==
- Type 16 frigate: postwar conversion of some O and P class vessels into second-rate fast anti-submarine frigates.
