= Italian torpedo boat Tifone =

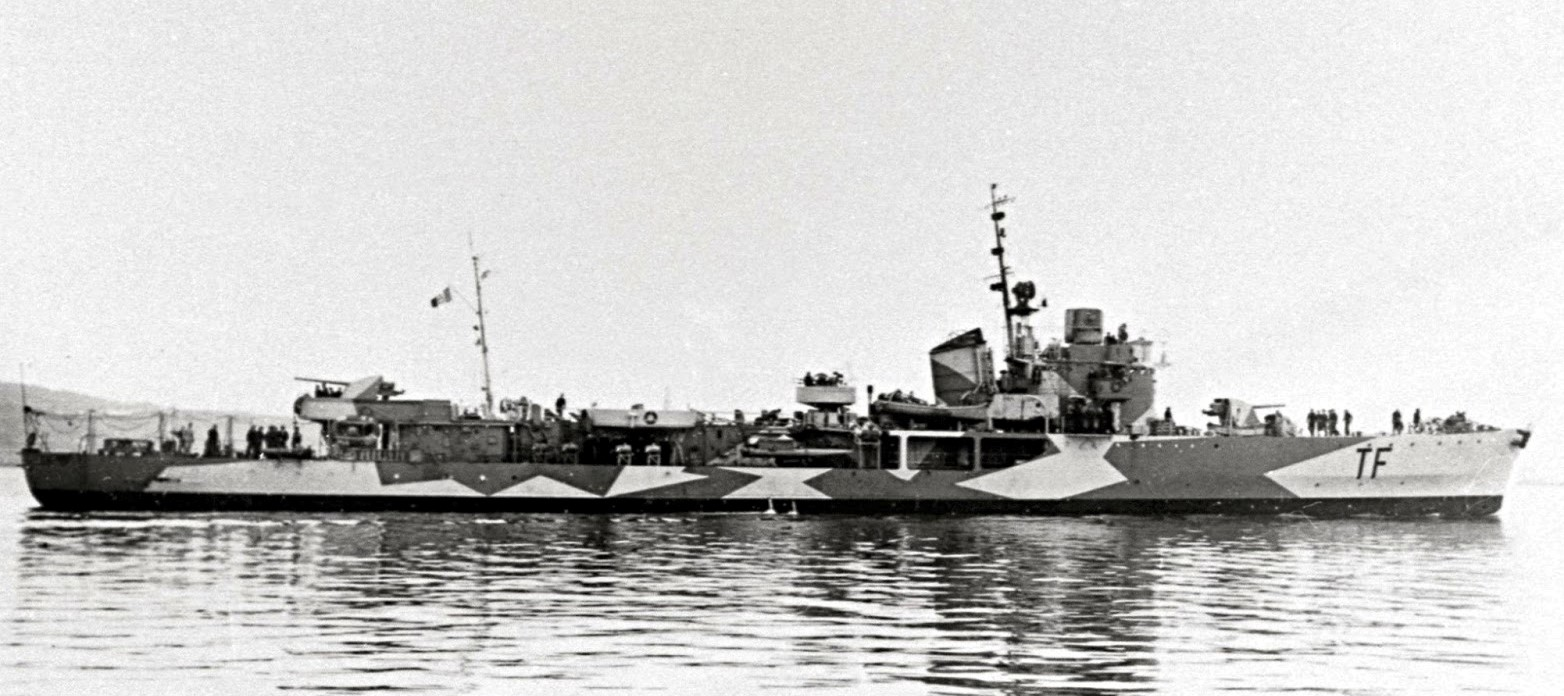
- Tifone, 4 April 1943

History

Italy
- Name: Tifone
- Builder: Cantieri Riuniti dell'Adriatico, Trieste
- Laid down: 17 June 1941
- Launched: 31 March 1942
- Completed: 11 July 1942
- Fate: Scuttled 7 May 1943

General characteristics
- Class & type: Ciclone-class torpedo boat
- Displacement: 910 long tons (920 t) standard; 1,625 long tons (1,651 t) full load
- Length: 82.5 m (270 ft 8 in)
- Beam: 9.9 m (32 ft 6 in)
- Draught: 3.77 m (12 ft 4 in)
- Propulsion: 2 shaft steam turbines; 2 Yarrow type boilers; 16,000 hp (11,900 kW)
- Speed: 26 knots (48 km/h; 30 mph)
- Complement: 154
- Sensors & processing systems: Sonar and hydrophones
- Armament: 2 × 100 mm (4 in) / 47 caliber guns; 8 × 20 mm (0.79 in) anti-aircraft guns; 4 × 450 mm (18 in) torpedo tubes; 4 × depth charge throwers

Tifone was a Ciclone-class torpedo boat that served with the Italian Navy during the Second World War. The vessel entered service on 11 July 1942 and was scuttled on 7 May 1943 at Korbous, Tunisia. She escorted the last Axis convoy to reach Africa in World War II.

== Service history ==
Tifone's keel was laid down on 17 June 1941 by Cantieri Riuniti dell'Adriatico at Trieste. The ship was launched on 31 March 1942. Construction was completed on 11 July 1942. During the Tunisian campaign. she took part, both as escort vessel and supply ship, of the Cigno convoy, which beat off a British destroyer attack on 17 April 1943. Tifone had her fuel bunkers loaded with aviation spirit for Bizerte during the battle. Tifone successfully escorted the transport ship Belluno to Tunis for a second time on 4 May 1943, in what became the last successful Axis convoy to Africa, carrying out another fuel-delivery mission to Bizerte on the same trip. The small convoy successfully eluded a flotilla of British destroyers that had sunk the transport Campobasso and her escort the torpedo boat Perseo. Tifone was severely damaged in harbor by United States Army Air Forces aircraft while planning a return convoy to Palermo. She was scuttled by her own crew on 7 May 1943 at the small fishing port of Korbous, Tunisia.

== Sources ==
- Chesneau, Roger, ed. (1980). Conway's All the World's Fighting Ships 1922–1946. Greenwich, UK: Conway Maritime Press. ISBN 0-85177-146-7.
- Fraccaroli, Aldo (1974) [1968]. Italian Warships of World War II. London: Ian Allan. ISBN 0-7110-0002-6.
- Whitley, M. J. (1988). Destroyers of World War 2. London: Cassell Publishing. ISBN 1-85409-521-8.
