= Convoy QP 12 =

Artic convoy of the Second World War

- Part of Arctic Convoys of the Second World War
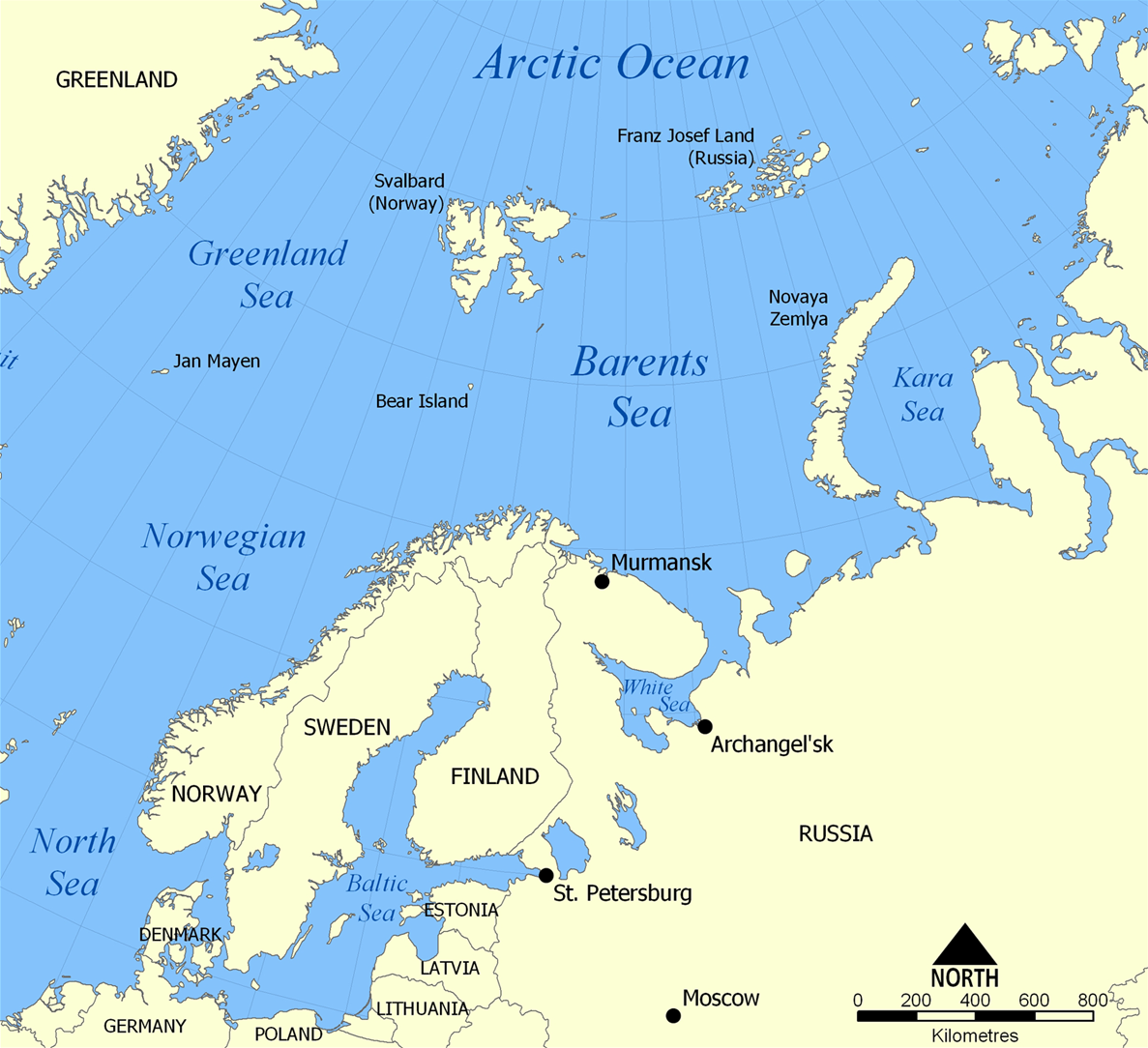
- The Norwegian and the Barents seas, site of the Arctic convoys
Date	21–29 May 1942
Location	Arctic Ocean

Belligerents
Royal Navy; United States; Merchant Navy; Soviet Union	Luftwaffe; Kriegsmarine

Commanders and leaders
Convoy Commodore: Southgate; Vice-Convoy Commodore: Cape Race	Hans-Jürgen Stumpff; Hermann Böhm

Strength
17 Merchant ships; 18 escorts (in relays); Cruiser cover, ex-Convoy PQ 16:7 ships	4 aircraft; several U-boats

Casualties and losses
1 CAM ship pilot killed; 1 Hurricane fighter lost; 2 merchant ships turned back	1 Junkers Ju 88 shot down

Convoy QP 12 (21–29 May 1942) departed from Murmansk with 17 merchant ships on the same day that the reciprocal Convoy PQ 16 departed from Hvalfjörður in Iceland. Kuzbass and Hegira had to return to Murmansk, and the rest of the convoy reached Seyðisfjörður in Iceland safely, having suffered no attacks from German aircraft or U-boats, which concentrated on Convoy PQ 16.

On 25 May, SS Empire Morn, a CAM ship, launched its Hurricane fighter whose pilot, John Kendal, shot down a Junkers Ju 88 before it could attack and then jumped from his Hurricane. He was killed shortly after being picked up because his parachute failed to deploy in time. His sortie deterred the other aircraft around the convoy from attacking.

The difficulties experienced by Luftflotte V and the Kriegsmarine over the winter of 1941−1942 had been alleviated by the longer hours of daylight and milder weather of the spring. Senior British naval commanders looked on the months of the Arctic summer with foreboding.

== Background ==
=== Lend-lease ===
The Soviet leaders needed to replace the colossal losses of military equipment lost after the German invasion, especially when Soviet war industries were being moved out of the war zone and emphasised tank and aircraft deliveries. Machine tools, steel and aluminium was needed to replace indigenous resources lost in the invasion. The pressure on the civilian sector of the economy needed to be limited by food deliveries. The Soviets wanted to concentrate the resources that remained on items that the Soviet war economy that had the greatest comparative advantage over the German economy. Aluminium imports allowed aircraft production to a far greater extent than would have been possible using local sources and tank production was emphasised at the expense of lorries and food supplies were squeezed by reliance on what could be obtained from lend–lease. At the Moscow Conference, it was acknowledged that 1.5 million tons of shipping was needed to transport the supplies of the First Protocol and that Soviet sources could provide less than 10 per cent of the carrying capacity.

The British and Americans accepted that the onus was on them to find most of the shipping, despite their commitments in other theatres. The Prime Minister, Winston Churchill, made a promise to send a convoy to the Arctic ports of the USSR every ten days and to deliver 1,200 tanks a month from July 1942 to January 1943, followed by 2,000 tanks and another 3,600 aircraft more than already promised. In November, the US president, Franklin D. Roosevelt, ordered Admiral Emory Land of the US Maritime Commission and then the head of the War Shipping Administration that deliveries to Russia should only be limited by 'insurmountable difficulties'. The first convoy was due at Murmansk around 12 October and the next convoy was to depart Iceland on 22 October. A motley of British, Allied and neutral shipping loaded with military stores and raw materials for the Soviet war effort would be assembled at Hvalfjörður in Iceland, convenient for ships from both sides of the Atlantic.

From Operation Dervish to Convoy PQ 11, the supplies to the USSR were mostly British, in British ships defended by the Royal Navy. A fighter force that could defend Murmansk was delivered that protected the Arctic ports and railways into the hinterland. Before September 1941 the British had dispatched 450 aircraft, 22,000 long tons (22,000 t) of rubber, 3,000,000 pairs of boots and stocks of tin, aluminium, jute, lead and wool. In September British and US representatives travelled to Moscow to study Soviet requirements and their ability to meet them. The representatives of the three countries drew up a protocol in October 1941 to last until June 1942. British-supplied aircraft and tanks reinforced the Russian defences of Leningrad and Moscow from December 1941. The tanks and aircraft did not save Moscow but were important in the Soviet counter-offensive. The Luftwaffe was by then reduced to 600 operational aircraft on the Eastern Front, to an extent a consequence of Luftflotte 2 being sent to the Mediterranean against the British. Tanks and aircraft supplied by the British helped the Soviet counter-offensive force push the Germans further back than might have been possible. In January and February 1941, deliveries of tanks and aircraft allowed the Russians to have a margin of safety should the Germans attempt to counter-attack.

=== Signals intelligence ===
==== Ultra ====
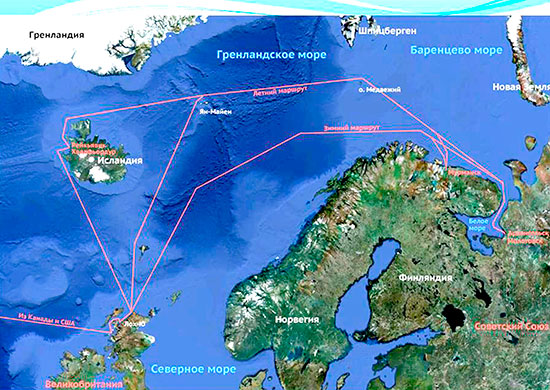
Russian map showing Arctic convoy routes from Britain and Iceland, past Norway to the Barents Sea and northern Russian ports

The British Government Code and Cypher School (GC&CS) based at Bletchley Park housed a small industry of code-breakers and traffic analysts. By June 1941, the German Enigma machine Home Waters (Heimish) settings used by surface ships and U-boats could quickly be read. On 1 February 1942, the Enigma machines used in U-boats in the Atlantic and Mediterranean were changed but German ships and the U-boats in Arctic waters continued with the older Heimish Home Hydra from 1942, Dolphin to the British). By mid-1941, British Y-stations were able to receive and read Luftwaffe W/T transmissions and give advance warning of Luftwaffe operations. In 1941, naval Headache personnel with receivers to eavesdrop on Luftwaffe wireless transmissions were embarked on warships.

=== B-Dienst ===
The rival German Beobachtungsdienst (B-Dienst, Observation Service) of the Kriegsmarine Marinenachrichtendienst (MND, Naval Intelligence Service) had broken several Admiralty codes and cyphers by 1939, which were used to help Kriegsmarine ships elude British forces and provide opportunities for surprise attacks. From June to August 1940, six British submarines were sunk in the Skaggerak using information gleaned from British wireless signals. In 1941, B-Dienst read signals from the Commander in Chief Western Approaches informing convoys of areas patrolled by U-boats, enabling the submarines to move into "safe" zones.

=== Arctic Ocean ===
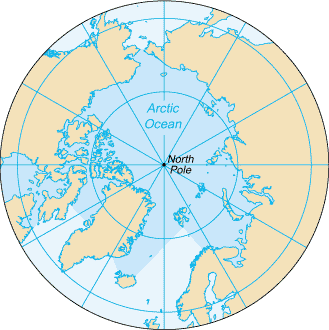
Diagram of the Arctic Ocean

Between Greenland and Norway are some of the most stormy waters of the world's oceans, 890 mi (1,440 km) of water under gales of snow, sleet and hail. The cold Arctic water was met by the Gulf Stream, warm water from the Gulf of Mexico, which became the North Atlantic Drift. Arriving at the south-west of England the drift moves between Scotland and Iceland; north of Norway the drift splits. One stream bears north of Bear Island to Svalbard and a southern stream follows the coast of Murmansk into the Barents Sea. The mingling of cold Arctic water and warmer water of higher salinity generates thick banks of fog for convoys to hide in but the waters drastically reduced the effectiveness of Asdic as U-boats moved in waters of differing temperatures and density.

In winter, polar ice can form as far south as 50 mi (80 km) off the North Cape and in summer it can recede to Svalbard. The area is in perpetual darkness in winter and permanent daylight in the summer and can make air reconnaissance almost impossible. Around the North Cape and in the Barents Sea the sea temperature rarely rises about 4 °C (39 °F) and a man in the water will die unless rescued immediately. The cold water and air make spray freeze on the superstructure of ships, which has to be removed quickly to avoid the ship becoming top-heavy. Conditions in U-boats were, if anything, worse the boats having to submerge in warmer water to rid the superstructure of ice. Crewmen on watch were exposed to the elements, oil lost its viscosity and nuts froze and sheared off bolts. Heaters in the hull were too demanding of current and could not be run continuously.

== Prelude ==
=== Kriegsmarine ===
German naval forces in Norway were commanded by Hermann Böhm, the Kommandierender Admiral Norwegen. Two U-boats were based in Norway in July 1941, four in September, five in December and four in January 1942. Hitler contemplated establishing a unified command but decided against it. The German battleship Tirpitz arrived at Trondheim on 16 January, the first ship of a general move of surface ships to Norway. British convoys to Russia had received little attention since they averaged only eight ships each and the long Arctic winter nights negated even the limited Luftwaffe reconnaissance effort that was available.

=== Luftflotte 5 ===
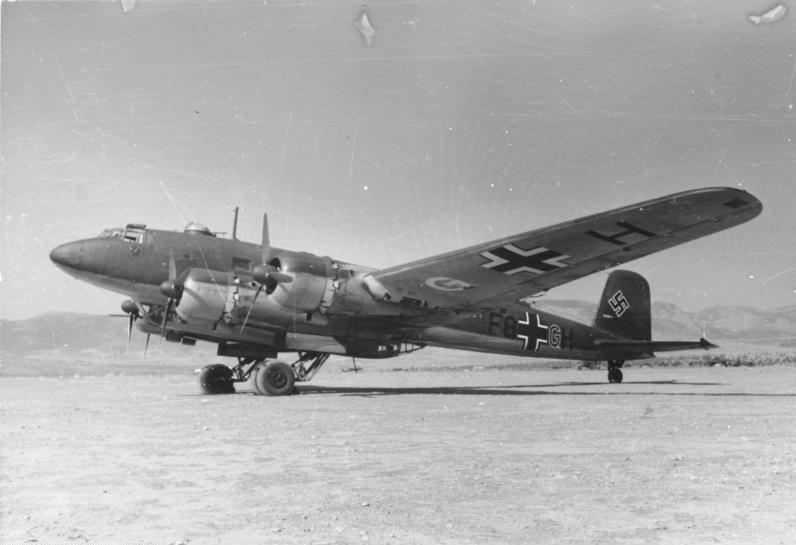
A Focke-Wulf Fw 200 Kondor of KG 40

In mid-1941, Luftflotte 5 (Air Fleet 5) had been re-organised for Operation Barbarossa with Luftgau Norwegen (Air Region Norway) headquartered in Oslo. Fliegerführer Stavanger (Air Commander Stavanger) the centre and north of Norway, Jagdfliegerführer Norwegen (Fighter Leader Norway) commanded the fighter force and Fliegerführer Kerkenes (Oberst [colonel] Andreas Nielsen) in the far north had airfields at Kirkenes and Banak. The Air Fleet had 180 aircraft, sixty of which were reserved for operations on the Karelian Front against the Red Army.

The distance from Banak to Arkhangelsk was 560 mi (900 km) and Fliegerführer Kerkenes had only ten Junkers Ju 88 bombers of Kampfgeschwader 30, thirty Junkers Ju 87 Stuka dive-bombers ten Messerschmitt Bf 109 fighters of Jagdgeschwader 77, five Messerschmitt Bf 110 heavy fighters of Zerstörergeschwader 76, ten reconnaissance aircraft and an anti-aircraft battalion. Sixty aircraft were far from adequate in such a climate and terrain where

...there is no favourable season for operations. (Earl Ziemke [1959] in Claasen [2001])

The emphasis of air operations changed from army support to anti-shipping operations only after March 1942, when Allied Arctic convoys becoming larger and more frequent coincided with the reinforcement of Norway with ships and aircraft and the less extreme climatic conditions of the Arctic summer.

=== Arctic convoys ===
A convoy was defined as at least one merchant ship sailing under the protection of at least one warship. At first the British had intended to run convoys to Russia on a forty-day cycle (the number of days between convoy departures) during the winter of 1941–1942, but this was shortened to a ten-day cycle. The round trip to Murmansk for warships was three weeks and each convoy needed a cruiser and two destroyers, which severely depleted the Home Fleet. Convoys left port and rendezvoused with the escorts at sea. A cruiser provided distant cover from a position to the west of Bear Island. Air support was limited to 330 Squadron and 269 Squadron of RAF Coastal Command from Iceland, with some help from anti-submarine patrols along the coast of Norway from RAF Sullom Voe in Shetland. Anti-submarine trawlers escorted the convoys on the first part of the outward voyage. Built for Arctic conditions, the trawlers were coal-burning ships and had sufficient endurance. The trawlers were commanded by their peacetime crews and captains with the rank of Skipper, Royal Naval Reserve (RNR) who were used to Arctic conditions, supplied by anti-submarine specialists of the Royal Naval Volunteer Reserve (RNVR). British minesweepers based at Arkhangelsk met the convoys to join the escort for the remainder of the voyage.

=== Convoy ===
The Convoy Commodore was embarked in the British Southgate with the Vice-Commodore in Cape Race, also British. There were eleven US ships, four British and two Soviet ships. From 21 to 23 May the Eastern local escort was to be provided by the Soviet destroyers Grozny and Sokrushitelny four Halcyon-class minesweepers of the 6th Minesweeper Squadron, HMS Bramble, Gossamer, Leda and Seagull. Sailing from 21 to 27 May, having accompanied the Eastern local escort from Murmansk, the destroyers HMS Badsworth and HMS Venomous with the auxiliary anti-aircraft cruiser HMS Ulster Queen were to take over the escort of the convoy. From 21 May to 29 May the destroyers HMS Boadicea, Escapade, Inglefield and HNoMS St Albans, the minesweeper HMS Harrier and the trawlers HMT Cape Palliser, Northern Pride, Northern Wave and Vizalma accompanied the convoy. Cruiser cover was to come from escorts detached from Convoy PQ 16, HMS Kent, Liverpool, Nigeria and Norfolk with the destroyers HMS Icarus, Marne and Onslow, the Home Fleet providing distant cover for both convoys.

== Voyage ==
=== 21−24 May ===
The convoy sailed on 21 May from the Kola Inlet with the four minesweepers and the two Soviet destroyers that turned back at the 30th meridian east. The escorts were commanded from Inglefield, its commander Captain Percy Todd being the Senior Officer escort. Inglefield had continued to Murmansk after being one of the destroyer escorts of the cruiser force led by Admiral Harold Burrough that had been intended to rendezvous with HMS Trinidad on its return voyage from Murmansk. On 22 May the US SS Hegira turned back with engine trouble and SS Kuzbass also turned back.

=== 25 May ===
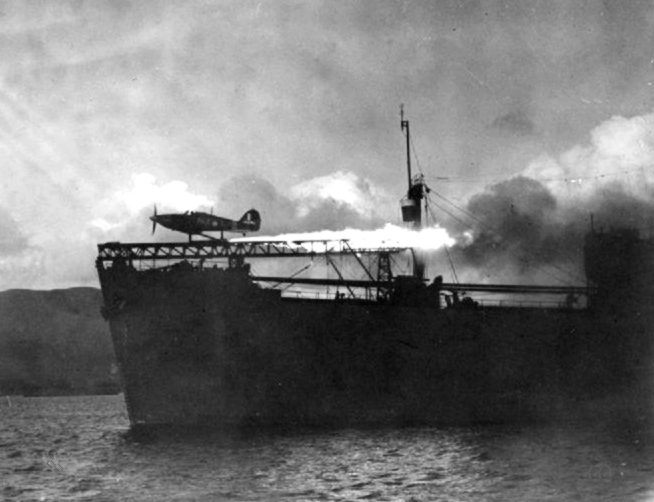
Test launch of a Hurricane from a CAM ship c. 1941

Despite good visibility it was not until 25 May that Luftwaffe reconnaissance aircraft were seen from the convoy. Before mid-day a Fw 200 Kondor, a BV 138 and two Junkers Ju 88s (Ju 88) turned up. Empire Morn a CAM ship launched Flying Officer John Kendal in his Hurricane. Kendal found that his R/T was unserviceable and had no contact with his fighter direction officer on Empire Morn, Sub-Lieutenant P. G. Mallett. The BV 138 had disappeared into cloud so Kendal attacked a Ju 88 and chased it along the convoy, Kendal jinking from side-to-side, firing two bursts and then overshooting the bomber. The Ju 88 caught fire, dumped its bombs and crashed into the sea.

Kendal intended to ditch near Boadicea the ship detailed to recover him but it was near low rain clouds. Mallet tried to warn Kendal, got no reply but saw the Hurricane turn back towards Badsworth, circle and wag its wings indicating that Kendal was going to parachute. Kendal climbed and was lost to sight in the clouds. The engine noise stopped and the Hurricane dived from the clouds into the sea, shortly followed by Kendal whose parachute did not open until about 50 ft (15 m) above the sea, the parachute not fully deployed when Kendal hit the surface. Badsworth plucked Kendal from the sea but he died of his injuries ten minutes later. Kendal deterred the other German aircraft and might also have delayed attacks on Convoy PQ 16, which crossed with the convoy three hours later at 2:00 p.m.

=== 26–29 May ===
Convoy QP 12 pressed on through a fog bank that stopped any nearby U-boats from attacking and on 29 May the convoy reached Iceland.

== Aftermath ==
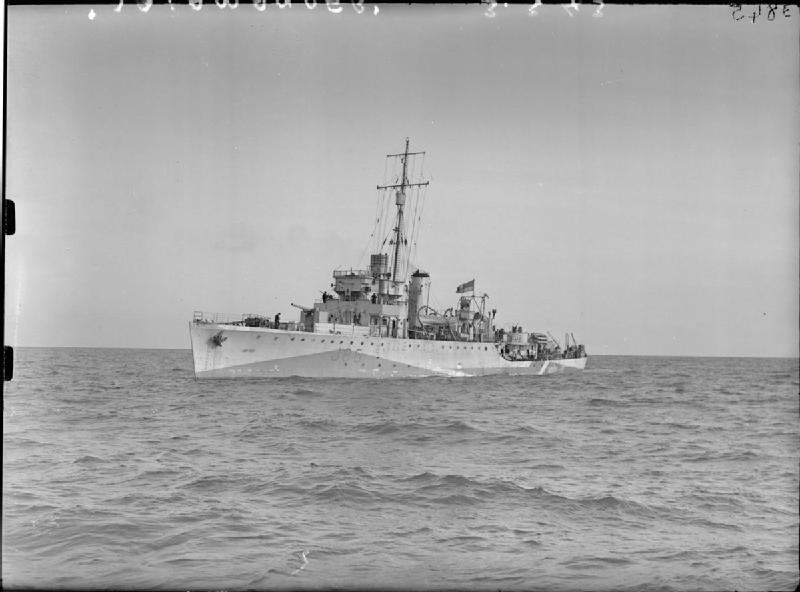
HMS Salamander, a Halcyon-class minesweeper

The lack of visibility that protected Convoy QP 12 combined with the big effort mounted by the Germans against Convoy PQ 16, a more valuable target since it was en route to Russia and full of supplies. After the failure of the operation to escort the cruiser, Trinidad, back to Iceland, Admiral Stuart Bonham Carter had concluded that until the long hours of darkness returned and the airfields at Banak and Bardufoss were neutralised, Arctic convoys should be suspended.

Aware of the political imperative to assist the Soviet Union and that his findings would be ignored, he told the Commander in Chief Admiral John Tovey who, like Admiral Dudley Pound the first Sea Lord also wanted to suspend convoys during the summer months,

We in the Navy are paid to do this job but it is beginning to ask too much of the men of the Merchant Navy.

It was still debatable what damage the Germans could inflict with better weather and longer hours of daylight but the vulnerability of the ships was demonstrated by the events of the next outbound Convoy PQ 16.

== Allied order of battle ==
=== Convoyed ships ===
Merchant ships (Note: Convoys had a standard formation of short columns, number 1 to the left in the direction of travel. Each position in the column was numbered; 11 was the first ship in column 1 and 12 was the second ship in the column; 21 was the first ship in column 2.)
Ship	Year	Flag	GRT	P'n	Notes
Murmansk to Iceland
SS Alcoa Rambler	1912	United States	5,848	52	
SS Bayou Chico	1930	United States	4,023	53	
SS Cape Race	1917	Merchant Navy	5,248	41	Vice-convoy Commodore
SS Empire Morn	1941	Merchant Navy	7,117	51	CAM ship
SS Expositor	1928	United States	4,959	11	
SS Francis Scott Key	1926	United States	4,862	42	
SS Hegira	1931	United States	3,559	13	Turned back 22 May, engine trouble
SS Ilmen	1933	Soviet Union	3,974	12	
SS Kuzbass	1914	Soviet Union	3,109	23	Turned back
SS Mormacrio	1919	United States	5,940	—	
SS Paul Luckenbach	1913	United States	6,606	43	
SS Scottish American	1920	Merchant Navy	6,999	32	
SS Seattle Spirit	1919	United States	5,627	22	
SS Southgate	1926	Merchant Navy	4,862	3	Convoy commodore
SS Texas	1919	United States	5,638	—	
SS Topa Topa	1920	United States	5,356	21	
SS Zebulon B. Vance	1942	United States	7,177	33	

=== Convoy formation ===
Order of sail (Note: Convoys had a standard formation of short columns, number 1 to the left in the direction of travel. Each position in the column was numbered; 11 was the first ship in column 1 and 12 was the second ship in the column; 21 was the first ship in column 2.)
column 1	column 2	column 3	column 4	column 5
11 Expositor	21 SS Topa Topa	31 SS Southgate	41 Cape Race	51 SS Empire Morn
12 Ilmen	22 Seattle Spirit	32 Scottish American	42 Francis Scott Key	52 Alcoa Rambler
13 Hegira	23 Kuzbass	33 SS Zebulon B. Vance	43 Paul Luckenbach	53 Bayou Chico
14 ?Mormacrio	24 Texas	34 —	44 —	54 —

=== Escorts ===
See Convoy PQ 16 order of battle for details of the Home Fleet and submarine cover.

Escort forces (in relays)
Ship	Flag	Type	Notes
Eastern local escort
Grozny	Soviet Navy	Gnevny-class destroyer	21–23 May
Sokrushitelny	Soviet Navy	Gnevny-class destroyer	21–23 May
HMS Bramble	Royal Navy	Halcyon-class minesweeper	21–23 May
HMS Gossamer	Royal Navy	Halcyon-class minesweeper	21–23 May
HMS Leda	Royal Navy	Halcyon-class minesweeper	21–23 May
HMS Seagull	Royal Navy	Halcyon-class minesweeper	21–23 May
Ocean escort
HMS Badsworth	Royal Navy	Hunt-class destroyer	21–27 May
HMS Venomous	Royal Navy	W-class destroyer	21–27 May
HMS Ulster Queen	Royal Navy	Auxiliary Anti-aircraft cruiser	21–27 May
HMS Boadicea	Royal Navy		21–29 May
HMS Escapade	Royal Navy		21–29 May
HMS Inglefield	Royal Navy		21–29 May
HMS St Albans	Royal Navy		21–29 May
HMS Harrier	Royal Navy		21–29 May
HMT Cape Palliser	Royal Navy		21–29 May
HMT Northern Pride	Royal Navy		21–29 May
HMT Northern Wave	Royal Navy		21–29 May
HMT Vizalma	Royal Navy		21–29 May
Cruiser cover
HMS Kent	Royal Navy	County-class cruiser	
HMS Norfolk	Royal Navy	County-class cruiser	
HMS Nigeria	Royal Navy	Fiji-class cruiser	
HMS Liverpool	Royal Navy	Town-class cruiser	
HMS Icarus	Royal Navy	I-class destroyer	
HMS Marne	Royal Navy	M-class destroyer	
HMS Onslow	Royal Navy	O-class destroyer	

== Bibliography ==
- Boog, H.; Rahn, W.; Stumpf, R.; Wegner, B. (2001). The Global War: Widening of the Conflict into a World War and the Shift of the Initiative 1941–1943. Germany in the Second World War. Vol. VI. Translated by Osers, E.; Brownjohn, J.; Crampton, P.; Willmot, L. (Eng trans. Oxford University Press, London ed.). Potsdam: Militärgeschichtliches Forschungsamt (Research Institute for Military History). ISBN 0-19-822888-0.
  - Rahn, W. "Part III. The War at Sea in the Atlantic and in the Arctic Ocean III. The Conduct of the War in the Atlantic and the Coastal Area (b) The Third Phase, April–December 1941: The Extension of the Areas of Operations". In Boog et al. (2001).
- Boyd, Andrew (2024). Arms for Russia & the Naval War in the Arctic 1941–1945. Barnsley: Seaforth (Pen & Sword). ISBN 978-1-3990-3886-7.
- Claasen, A. R. A. (2001). Hitler's Northern War: The Luftwaffe's Ill-fated Campaign, 1940–1945. Lawrence, KS: University Press of Kansas. ISBN 0-7006-1050-2.
- Hancock, W. K.; Gowing, M. M. (1949). Hancock, W. K. (ed.). British War Economy. History of the Second World War, United Kingdom Civil Series. London: HMSO. OCLC 630191560.
- Hinsley, F. H. (1994) [1993]. British Intelligence in the Second World War: Its Influence on Strategy and Operations. History of the Second World War, United Kingdom Military Series (2nd rev. abr. ed.). London: HMSO. ISBN 978-0-11-630961-7.
- Jordan, Roger W. (2006) [1999]. The World's Merchant Fleets 1939: The Particulars and Wartime Fates of 6,000 Ships (2nd ed.). London: Chatham/Lionel Leventhal. ISBN 978-1-86176-293-1.
- Kahn, D. (1973) [1967]. The Codebreakers: The Story of Secret Writing (10th abr. Signet, Chicago ed.). New York: Macmillan. LCCN 63-16109. OCLC 78083316.
- Macksey, K. (2004) [2003]. The Searchers: Radio Intercept in two World Wars (Cassell Military Paperbacks ed.). London: Cassell. ISBN 978-0-304-36651-4.
- Mitchell, W. H.; Sawyer, L. A. (1990). The Empire Ships (2nd ed.). London, New York, Hamburg, Hong Kong: Lloyd's of London Press Ltd. ISBN 1-85044-275-4.
- Paterson, Lawrence (2016). Steel and Ice: The U-boat Battle in the Arctic and Black Sea 1941–45. Stroud: The History Press. ISBN 978-1-59114-258-4.
- Rohwer, Jürgen; Hümmelchen, Gerhard (2005) [1972]. Chronology of the War at Sea, 1939–1945: The Naval History of World War Two (3rd rev. ed.). London: Chatham. ISBN 978-1-86176-257-3.
- Roskill, S. W. (1957) [1954]. Butler, J. R. M. (ed.). The War at Sea 1939–1945: The Defensive. History of the Second World War United Kingdom Military Series. Vol. I (4th impr. ed.). London: HMSO. OCLC 881709135. Archived from the original on 27 February 2022.
- Ruegg, R.; Hague, A. (1993) [1992]. Convoys to Russia: Allied Convoys and Naval Surface Operations in Arctic Waters 1941–1945 (2nd rev. enl. ed.). Kendal: World Ship Society. ISBN 0-905617-66-5.
- Woodman, Richard (1994). Arctic Convoys 1941–1945 (hbk. ed.). London: John Murray. ISBN 0-7195-5079-3.
- Woodman, Richard (2004) [1994]. Arctic Convoys 1941–1945. London: John Murray. ISBN 978-0-7195-5752-1.
- Ziemke, Earl F. (1959). The German Northern Theatre of Operations, 1940–1945. Washington, DC: Headquarters, United States Department of the Army. OCLC 610363660. 20-271.
