= Convoy JW 51A =

Arctic convoy sent to aid the Soviet Union during World War II

- Part of Arctic Convoys of the Second World War
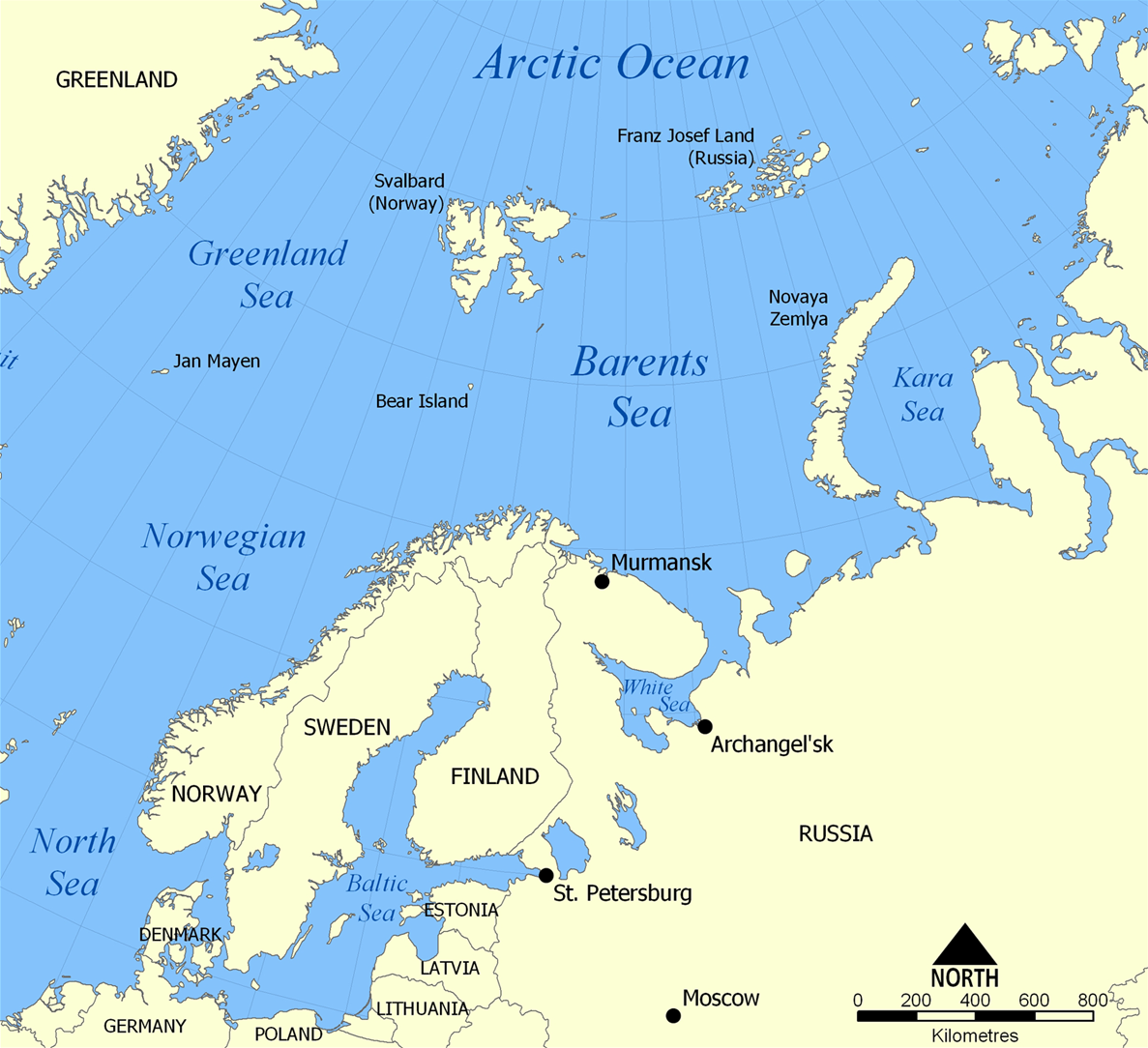
- The Norwegian and the Barents seas, site of the Arctic convoys
Date
Location
15−25 December 1942
- Norwegian Sea
- Barents Sea

Belligerents
Royal Navy; Merchant Navy	(Nazi Germany) Luftwaffe; Kriegsmarine

Commanders and leaders
Convoy: Charles Turle; Escorts: Alan Scott-Moncrieff	Otto Klüber

Casualties and losses
Nil	

Convoy JW 51A (15−25 December 1942) was an Arctic convoy sent from Great Britain by the Western Allies to aid the Soviet Union during the Second World War. Convoy JW 51A was not detected or attacked by German forces and arrived without loss.

== Background ==
Convoy JW 51A was the first of the JW–RA convoy series, replacing the previous PQ−QP series which had been suspended during the summer and autumn of 1942. The JW series were organized to sail from Loch Ewe, Scotland, rather than Iceland and sailed with a substantial destroyer escort to guard against surface attacks, as had proved effective with Convoy PQ 18. Ships from the US crossed the Atlantic in HX convoys from New York. Convoy JW 51A was the first outbound Arctic convoy of the 1942–1943 winter season and began the sailing of smaller convoys twice-monthly to reduce the problems of controlling large groups of ships in the gloom of the polar night.

== Forces ==
Convoy JW 51A consisted of 16 merchant ships, which departed from Loch Ewe on 15 December 1942. The western escort was provided by the corvettes HMS Honeysuckle and HMS Oxlip, the minesweeper HMS Seagull and the armed trawlers HMT Lady Madeleine and HMT Northern Wave. Three Hunt-class destroyers HMS Blankney, Chiddingfold and Ledbury These were supported by a Home Fleet fighting destroyer escort of HMS Boadicea, Echo, Eclipse HMS Faulknor (flag) Fury and Inglefield.

A cruiser cover force comprising HMS Jamaica and HMS Sheffield, and the destroyers HMS Beagle, Matchless and Opportune also followed the convoy to guard against attack by surface units. Distant cover was provided by the Home Fleet heavy cover comprising the battleship HMS King George V, the cruiser HMS Berwick and the destroyers HMS Musketeer, Quadrant and Raider.

Convoy JW 51A was opposed by the U-boats U-354 and U-626, commanded by Konteradmiral (Rear Admiral) Otto Klüber in a patrol line in the Norwegian Sea, and the aircraft of Luftflotte 5 based in Norway. A surface force comprising the heavy cruisers Admiral Hipper and Köln with the destroyers Z16 Friedrich Eckoldt, Z4 Richard Beitzen, Z6 Theodor Riedel, Z29, Z30 and Z31 were at Altenfjord. Lützow reached Narvik on 12 December.

== Voyage ==
Convoy JW 51A departed Loch Ewe on 15 December 1942, accompanied by its local escort, of three destroyers, and its close escort. Three days later, on 18 December, it was joined by the ocean escort, while the local escort departed. At the same time the Cruiser Force and the Distant Cover Force from Scapa Flow also put to sea, taking station in the Norwegian Sea. The convoy was not seen by German reconnaissance aircraft, nor by any of the patrolling U-boats, and crossed the Norwegian and Barents Seas without incident. On 25 December Convoy JW 51A arrived safely at Kola Inlet but five ships were sunk in the inlet by mines and attacks by the Luftwaffe. Five ships sailed on to Molotovsk, near Arkhangelsk, escorted by the Soviet destroyers Valerian Kuybyshev and Razyaryonny.

== Aftermath ==
Convoy JW 51A was a successful start to the JW convoy series and to the 1942–1943 winter convoy season, with the safe arrival of 16 merchant ships.

== Allied order of battle ==
=== Allied merchant ships ===
Merchant ships
Name	Year	Flag	GRT	Notes
Beauregard	1920	United States	5,976	15–25 December
Briarwood	1930	Merchant Navy	4,019	15–25 December, Convoy Commodore Charles Turle
Dynastic	1919	United States	5,773	15–25 December
El Almirante	1917	Panama	5,248	15–25 December
El Oceano	1925	Panama	6,767	15–25 December
Empire Meteor	1940	Merchant Navy	7,457	15–25 December, Vice-Convoy Commodore
Gateway City	1920	United States	5,432	15–25 December
Greylock	1921	United States	7,640	15–25 December
JLM Curry	1942	United States	7,176	15–25 December
RFA Oligarch	1918	Royal Navy	6,894	15–25 December, Oiler
Oremar 52	1919	United States	6,854	15–25 December
Richard Basset	1942	United States	7,191	15–25 December
Richard Bland	1942	United States	7,191	15–25 December
San Cipriano	1937	Merchant Navy	7,966	15–25 December
West Gotomska	1918	United States	5,728	15–25 December
Wind Rush	1918	United States	5,586	15–25 December

=== Escort forces ===
Escorts (in relays)
Name	Flag	Type	Notes
Western local escort
HMS Blankney	Royal Navy	Hunt-class destroyer	15–18 December
HMS Chiddingfold	Royal Navy	Hunt-class destroyer	15–18 December
HMS Ledbury	Royal Navy	Hunt-class destroyer	15–18 December
Close escort
HMS Honeysuckle	Royal Navy	Flower-class corvette	15–25 December
HMS Oxlip	Royal Navy	Flower-class corvette	15–25 December
HMS Seagull	Royal Navy	Halcyon-class minesweeper	15–25 December
HMT Lady Madeleine	Royal Navy	ASW trawler	15–25 December
HMT Northern Wave	Royal Navy	ASW trawler	15–25 December
Oceanic escort
Fighting destroyer escort
HMS Boadicea	Royal Navy	B-class destroyer	18 December – 4 January
HMS Echo	Royal Navy	E-class destroyer	18 December – 4 January
HMS Eclipse	Royal Navy	E-class destroyer	18 December – 4 January
HMS Faulknor	Royal Navy	F-class destroyer	18 December – 4 January
HMS Fury	Royal Navy	F-class destroyer	18 December – 4 January
HMS Inglefield	Royal Navy	I-class destroyer	18 December – 4 January
Cruiser covering force (Force R)
HMS Jamaica	Royal Navy	Fiji-class cruiser	19–24 December
HMS Sheffield	Royal Navy	Town-class cruiser	Flag, Rear-Admiral Robert Burnett 19–24 December
HMS Beagle	Royal Navy	B-class destroyer	19–24 December
HMS Matchless	Royal Navy	M-class destroyer	19–24 December
HMS Opportune	Royal Navy	O-class destroyer	19–24 December
Distant cover (Home Fleet)
HMS King George V	Royal Navy	King George V-class battleship	19–22 December
HMS Berwick	Royal Navy	County-class cruiser	19–22 December
HMS Musketeer	Royal Navy	M-class destroyer	19–22 December
HMS Quadrant	Royal Navy	Q-class destroyer	19–22 December
HMS Raider	Royal Navy	R-class destroyer	19–22 December
Submarine patrols off Bear Island
HMS Sea Nymph	Royal Navy	British U-class submarine	
HMS Taurus	Royal Navy	British T-class submarine	
HMS Torbay	Royal Navy	British T-class submarine	
ORP Sokół	Polish Navy	S-class submarine	
Submarine patrols off Norwegian fjords
HMS Graph	Royal Navy	Type VIIC U-boat	Captured and in British service
HNLMS O 14	Royal Netherlands Navy	O 12-class submarine	
HMS Seadog	Royal Navy	S-class submarine	
HMS Trespasser	Royal Navy	British T-class submarine	
HMS Unruly	Royal Navy	British U-class submarine	

== German order of battle ==
Kriegsmarine
Ship	Flag	Type	Notes
Surface force (Unternehmen Regenbogen)
Admiral Hipper	Kriegsmarine	Admiral Hipper-class cruiser	
Lützow	Kriegsmarine	Admiral Hipper-class cruiser	
Z4 Richard Beitzen	Kriegsmarine	Type 1934-class destroyer	
Z6 Theodor Riedel	Kriegsmarine	Type 1934A-class destroyer	
Z16 Friedrich Eckoldt	Kriegsmarine	Type 1934A-class destroyer	
Z29	Kriegsmarine	Type 1936A-class destroyer	
Z30	Kriegsmarine	Type 1936A-class destroyer	
Z31	Kriegsmarine	Type 1936A-class destroyer	
