= INS Ganga =

The following ships of the Indian Navy have been named Ganga:

- INS Ganga (D94) was a Type II Hunt-class destroyer, acquired from the Royal Navy where she served in World War II as HMS Chiddingfold, and commissioned into the Indian Navy in 1952
- INS Ganga (F22) was a Godavari-class frigate, commissioned in 1985 and decommissioned in 2018.
