= Charles Turle =

British Royal Navy commander

Rear-Admiral Charles Turle CBE DSO
- Captain Turle, 1929
- Born: 23 March 1883; Blackheath, Kent, England
- Died: 16 March 1966 (aged 82); Osborne Bay, Isle of Wight
- Military career
- Allegiance: United Kingdom
- Branch: Royal Navy
- Service years: 1904–1945
- Rank: Rear-Admiral
- Commands: HMS Frobisher; HMS Resolution; HMS Orion; HMS Drake; HMS President; Ocean Convoys; HMS Eaglet; HMS Nile
- Conflicts: First World War; Second World War
- Awards: Companion of the Distinguished Service Order; Commander of the Order of the British Empire

Rear-Admiral Charles Edward Turle, CBE, DSO (23 March 1883 – 16 March 1966) was a senior Royal Navy commander. Born in Kent, Turle was commissioned as a naval officer in 1903 and would serve in World War I and World War II, reaching the rank of Rear Admiral. He was the principal British Naval Attaché in Athens from 1929 to 1941, and thus played an important role in the naval aspect of the Greco-Italian war and subsequent German invasion of Greece.

== Early life and World War I ==
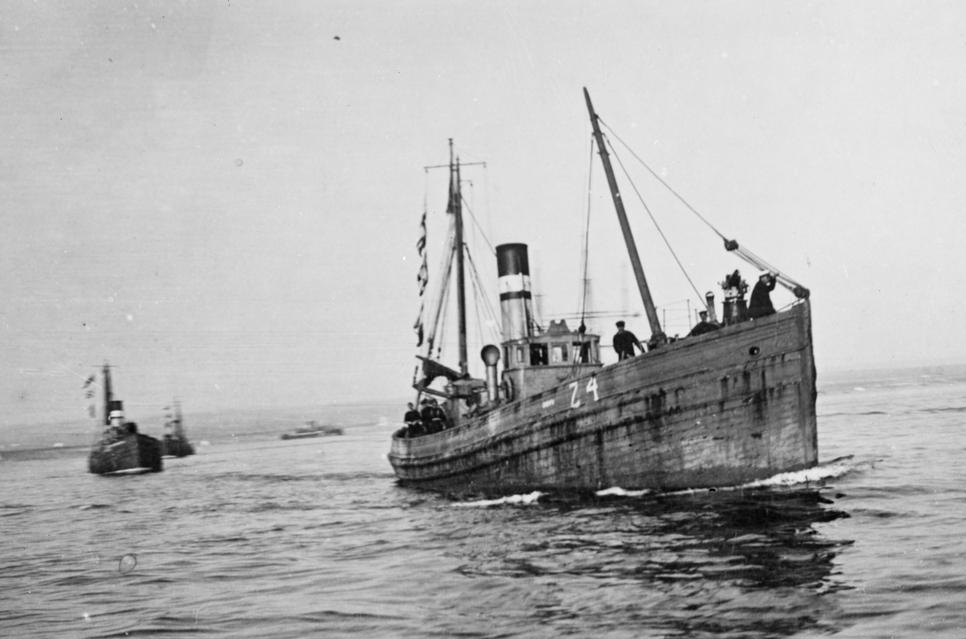
British net-drifters during the Otranto Barrage, 1918.

Born on 23 March 1883 in Blackheath, Kent, Charles Edward Turle was the son of Edward Turle and his wife Jessie Elizabeth (née Kieser). Educated at Wellington College, Turle began his naval career at a young age, entering HMS Britannia in September 1898. He was commissioned a temporary sub-Lieutenant on 15 July 1903 and confirmed in his rank the following year. For the annual manoeuvres of 1904, he commanded the torpedo boat HM TB 67 (1885), and by 1912 was promoted to the rank of Lieutenant commander.

At the outbreak of war in 1914, Turle was appointed as a torpedo officer on HMS Glory until 29 November. He was then transferred to the Royal Navy Reserve, serving on HMS President under Captain Leonard Donaldson. In May 1915, he was appointed in command of a net drifter Realize under Commodore Richard Bevan. Turle was promoted to the rank of Commander on 31 December 1915. In March 1918, he was appointed second-in-command of the Otranto Barrage, a naval blockade between Italy and Corfu which was intended to prevent the Austro-Hungarian Navy from exiting the Adriatic into the Mediterranean. He was awarded the Distinguished Service Order (DSO) for his service during this period.

== Inter-war period ==
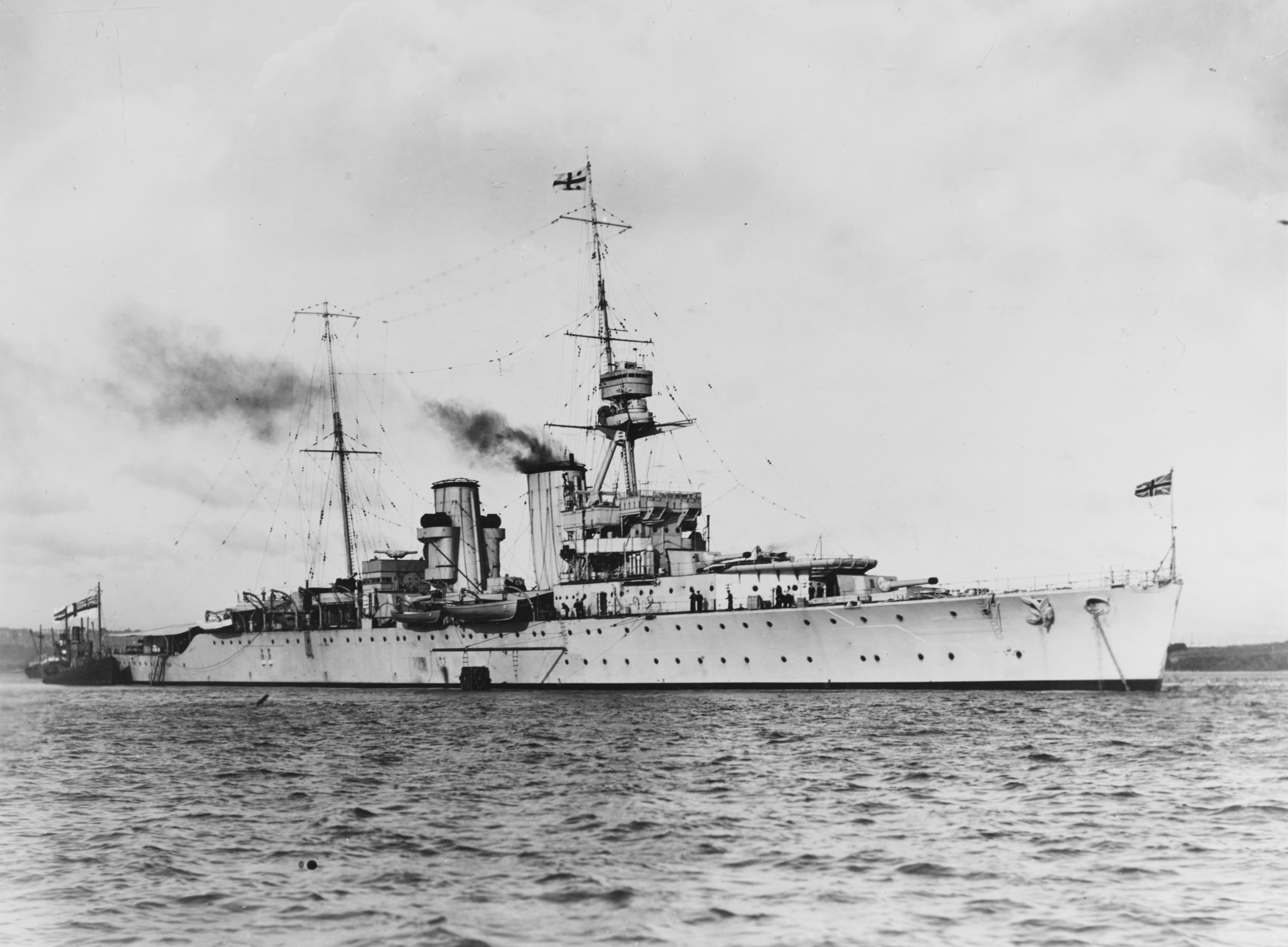
The heavy-cruiser HMS Frobisher, c. 1924:Turle's first command.

Turle retained his rank of Commander following the war. In November 1918, during the Allied intervention in the Russian Civil War, he was sent to Crimea to visit the Tsar's ageing mother, Maria Feodorovna. Arriving on HMS Tribune and accompanied by a White-Russian officer, the mission was to inform the Dowager Empress of Royal concern for her safety and implore her to return with them to Constantinople. In 1919, he was appointed as mine clearance officer (MCO) on board HMS Caesar, which was based at Constantinople and serving in the Aegean Sea and Black Sea.

Turle was promoted to Captain on 31 December 1921. In July 1924, he took command of the newly constructed Hawkins-class cruiser HMS Frobisher, which was assigned to the 1st Cruiser Squadron of the Mediterranean Fleet. The fleet-commander was Rear Admiral Lord Cork, to whom Turle served as Chief Staff Officer during this period. Frobisher was then posted to the China Station, where she was based at the Singapore. He was appointed as Director of the Naval Air Division, Admiralty, in April 1930. From 1933 to 1934, he was naval aide-de-camp (ADC) to His Majesty George V. Turle was then appointed as head of the British Naval Mission to the Hellenic Republic in 1929. In October 1931, he was appointed as Commander, Order of the Redeemer for service in Greece from 1927 to 1929. In October the following year, he was given command of his first battleship, HMS Resolution.

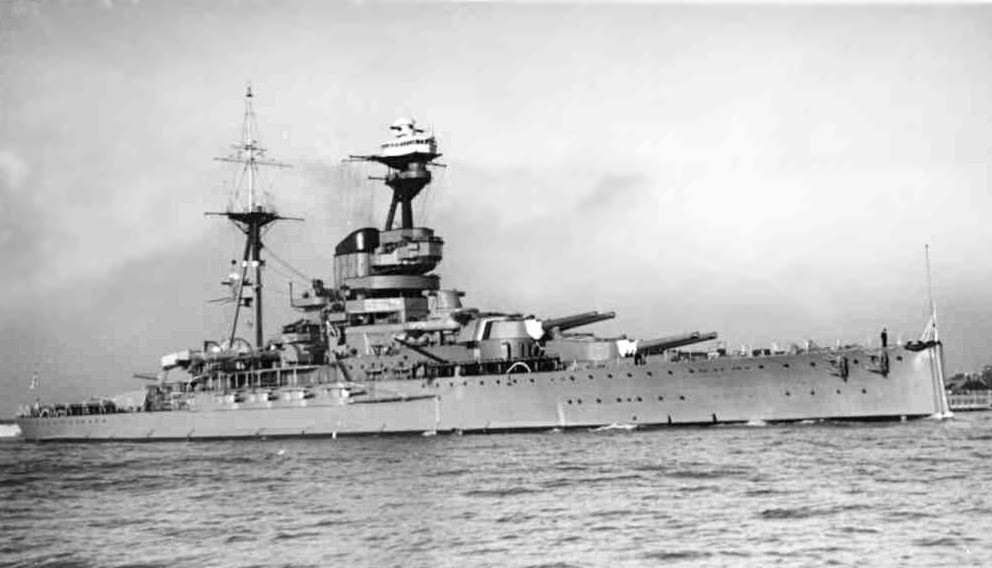
HMS Resolution, a Revenge-class battleship, which Turle commanded in 1932–1933.

He was promoted to Rear-Admiral on 12 February 1934; however, placed on the retired-list the following day. On 21 April 1938, Turle married Jane Gillies Gray, at St George's, Hanover Square, London, the daughter of James Gray, DL, JP, of Wemyss Bay, Renfrewshire, Scotland; the couple had two sons, the eldest of whom was SAS officer Arish Turle.

== World War II ==
At the outbreak of World War II, Turle was recalled by the navy and re-commissioned with the rank of Commodore. He was, again, sent on a naval mission to Athens. In October 1940, Italian forces invaded Greece and Turle was the senior British naval advisor in assisting the Greek defence. The Corinth Canal in Corinth played an important role in the Greek defence, disproportionate to its size, and Turle, on behalf of the Allied Navy, was forced to oversee its destruction. This was done to prevent the Italian forces from receiving oil from the Black Sea and sever the German supply line from reaching Rommel's Afrika Korps. He also suggested using the captured Italian submarines to block ports, such as Durazzo. The Hellenic army was able to repel the initial Italian invasion in April 1941, but later succumbed to a reinforced German attack. In 1941, he was appointed Grand Officer of the Order of George I (Greek: Basilikon Tagma toy Georgioya A), with swords.

He was mentioned in dispatches (MD) frequently throughout his career, but was particularly noted for services in ocean convoys in 1944. The same year he served on HMS Nile at the naval base at Alexandria, Egypt until 1945. He was appointed a Commander of the Order of the British Empire the following year in 1945 for his services in the relief of Greece. He retired shortly thereafter.

== Later life ==
Turle died at Osborne Bay, Isle of Wight in 1966. His ashes were ceremonially scattered at sea on 26 March 1966 and he was then cremated at Whippingham Crematorium, Whippingham. He was survived by his wife, Jane, and two sons, Arish and Gillies.

== Foreign honours ==
- Commander, Order of Saints Maurice and Lazarus (Italy)
- Commander, Order of the Redeemer (Greece)
- Grand Commander, Order of George I (Greece)

== Bibliography ==
- Alexiades, Platon (2015). Target Corinth Canal: 1910-1944. Pen & Sword Military. ISBN 9781473827561.
- Carr, John (2013). The Defence and Fall of Greece 1940-1941. Pen & Sword Military. ISBN 978-1781591819.
- Farquharson-Roberts, Mike (2015). Royal Naval Officers from War to War, 1918-1939 (1st ed.). Palgrave Macmillan. ISBN 978-1137481955.
- Halpern, Paul (2011). The Mediterranean Fleet, 1919-1929 (1st ed.). Navy Records Society (Routledge). ISBN 978-1409427568.
