= HMS Boadicea (H65) =

British destroyer, 1930–1944

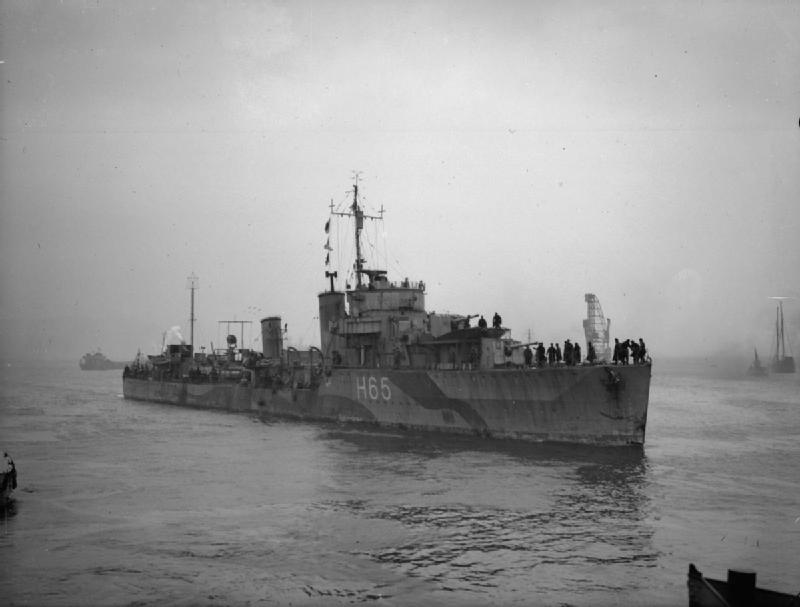
- Boadicea at anchor sometime during World War II

History

United Kingdom
- Name: Boadicea
- Namesake: Boadicea
- Ordered: 4 March 1929
- Builder: Hawthorn Leslie
- Laid down: 11 July 1929
- Launched: 23 September 1930
- Completed: 7 April 1931
- Identification: Pennant number: H65
- Fate: Sunk 13 June 1944, Lyme Bay

General characteristics (as built)
- Class & type: B-class destroyer
- Displacement: 1,360 long tons (1,380 t) (standard)
- Length: 323 ft (98.5 m) (o/a)
- Beam: 32 ft 3 in (9.8 m)
- Draught: 12 ft 3 in (3.7 m)
- Installed power: 3 × Admiralty 3-drum boilers; 34,000 shp (25,000 kW)
- Propulsion: 2 × shafts; 2 × geared steam turbines
- Speed: 35 knots (65 km/h; 40 mph)
- Range: 4,800 nmi (8,900 km; 5,500 mi) at 15 knots (28 km/h; 17 mph)
- Complement: 142 (wartime)
- Sensors & processing systems: Type 119 ASDIC
- Armament: 4 × single 4.7 in (120 mm) guns; 2 × single 2 pdr (40 mm (1.6 in)) AA guns; 2 × quadruple 21 in (533 mm) torpedo tubes; 1 × depth charge rail and 2 throwers; 20 × depth charges

HMS Boadicea was a B-class destroyer built for the Royal Navy (RN) around 1930. Initially assigned to the Mediterranean Fleet, she was transferred to the Home Fleet in 1936. Before her departure, the ship evacuated civilians from Spain during the beginning of the Spanish Civil War of 1936–1939. Boadicea later spent considerable time in Spanish waters, enforcing the arms blockade imposed by Britain and France on both sides of the conflict. During World War II, the ship spent the bulk of the war on convoy escort duty in British waters and participated in the Battle of the Atlantic, Operation Torch, the Russian Convoys, and in the Normandy landings. Badly damaged by German dive bombers in 1940, she was sunk almost exactly four years later by German aircraft.

== Description ==
Boadicea displaced 1,360 long tons (1,380 t) at standard load and 1,790 long tons (1,820 t) at deep load. The ship had an overall length of 323 feet (98.5 m), a beam of 32 feet 3 inches (9.8 m) and a draught of 12 feet 3 inches (3.7 m). She was powered by Parsons geared steam turbines, driving two shafts, which developed a total of 34,000 shaft horsepower (25,000 kW) and gave a maximum speed of 35 knots (65 km/h; 40 mph). Steam for the turbines was provided by three Admiralty 3-drum boilers. Boadicea carried a maximum of 390 long tons (400 t) of fuel oil that gave her a range of 4,800 nautical miles (8,900 km; 5,500 mi) at 15 knots (28 km/h; 17 mph). The ship's complement was 134 officers and ratings, although it increased to 142 during wartime.

The ship mounted four 45-calibre quick-firing (QF) 4.7-inch Mk IX guns in single mounts, designated 'A', 'B', 'X', and 'Y' from front to rear. For anti-aircraft (AA) defence, Boadicea had two 40-millimetre (1.6 in) QF 2-pounder Mk II AA guns mounted on a platform between her funnels. She was fitted with two above-water quadruple torpedo tube mounts for 21-inch (533 mm) torpedoes. One depth charge rail and two throwers were fitted; 20 depth charges were originally carried, but this increased to 35 shortly after the war began. The ship was fitted with a Type 119 ASDIC set to detect submarines by reflections from sound waves beamed into the water.

By October 1940, the ship's anti-aircraft armament was increased when the rear set of torpedo tubes was replaced by a 3-inch (76.2 mm) (12-pounder) AA gun. The 'Y' gun was later removed to compensate for the additional depth charges added. When Boadicea was converted into an escort destroyer at the end of 1943, her 'A' gun was replaced by a Hedgehog anti-submarine spigot mortar and additional depth charge stowage replaced the 12-pounder high-angle gun. In addition, two QF 6-pounder Hotchkiss guns were added to deal with surfaced submarines at close range and the 2-pounder guns were replaced by 20-millimetre (0.8 in) Oerlikon autocannon and four additional Oerlikon guns were also added.

== Construction and service ==
The ship was ordered on 4 March 1929 from Hawthorn Leslie, under the 1928 Naval Programme. She was laid down at Hebburn-on-Tyne on 11 July 1929, and launched on 23 September 1930, as the fifth RN ship to carry this name. Boadicea was completed on 9 April 1931 at a cost of £225,325, excluding items supplied by the Admiralty such as guns, ammunition and communications equipment. After her commissioning, she was assigned to the 4th Destroyer Flotilla with the Mediterranean Fleet until 1936. She was damaged whilst refuelling at sea with the battleship Revenge on 15 March 1935; her repairs lasted until 18 April. Later that year she was deployed to Famagusta, Cyprus, and Haifa, Palestine to assist British forces in putting down riots from December 1935 – January 1936. Boadicea had to return to Haifa in June to help put down the beginnings of the Arab Revolt. Afterwards the ship was deployed to Cartagena and Valencia to evacuate civilians at the start of the Spanish Civil War before beginning a refit at Portsmouth that lasted until 26 September. She remained with the 4th Flotilla until January 1939 and made multiple deployments off the coast of Spain enforcing the embargo until April 1938 when she was again refitted. After leaving the 4th Flotilla, Boadicea served as the plane guard for the aircraft carriers of the Mediterranean Fleet for a few months until she became the emergency destroyer at the Nore. She was attached to the Reserve Fleet at Portland for the Fleet Review in August 1939.

On 29 August, Boadicea was assigned to the 19th Destroyer Flotilla based at Dover where she escorted the troopships of the British Expeditionary Force through October. The ship was then transferred to the 22nd Destroyer Flotilla at Harwich for two months before rejoining the 19th Flotilla where she escorted convoys through the English Channel. On 4 March 1940, she towed the oil tanker Charles F. Meyer to Southampton Water after that ship struck a mine. Boadicea began a refit at Chatham Dockyard on 2 May and was not operational until she sailed for Le Havre, France on 9 June to assist in the evacuation of British troops before advancing German troops. The next afternoon, she was severely damaged by Junkers Ju 87 "Stuka" dive bombers that knocked out her engines and boilers. After all depth charges and torpedoes were jettisoned to reduce her topweight and temporary repairs made to the holes in her hull, Boadicea was towed by the destroyer Ambuscade and the tugboat Krooman to Dover.

A view of Boadicea's stern in heavy weather

Repairs at Portsmouth lasted until 14 February 1941 and included the installation of a Type 286 short-range surface search radar. Upon completions, the ship was assigned to Home Fleet and participated in the search for the German battleships Scharnhorst and Gneisenau which had broken out into the North Atlantic. In March, Boadicea was transferred to the 4th Escort Group at Greenock for convoy escort duties and remained with them until February 1942 when the group was disbanded. She was then assigned to the Western Approaches Command until July. The ship was detached to escort Convoys PQ 15 and Convoy QP 12 to and from Murmansk in April–May. Boadicea was refitted between August and October, after which she escorted a convoy to Gibraltar as part of the preparations for Operation Torch, the invasion of French North Africa. She escorted British ships to Oran during the invasion and was struck by a shell from a French L'Adroit-class destroyer on 8 November that did little damage. Three days later, the ship was escorting the empty ocean liner RMS Viceroy of India when the latter ship was torpedoed. The destroyer attempted to take the troopship under tow, but was unable to save the ship. Boadicea rescued 449 passengers and crew and delivered them to Gibraltar. Upon her return home, the ship was assigned to the 20th Escort Group where she escorted Convoys JW 51A, JW 53 and RA 53 to and from Russia. She was badly damaged by sea ice during the latter convoy in March and required repairs that lasted until May.

Upon their completion, Boadicea was transferred to Freetown, Sierra Leone where she served as a local escort. On 19 July, she rescued 220 survivors from the torpedoed ocean liner MV Incomati. The ship returned to the Home Fleet in September and briefly assigned to the 8th Escort Group before she started her conversion into an escort destroyer in November. This included the addition of Type 271 target indication radar and the replacement of the Type 286 radar by a Type 290. After this was completed in January 1944, Boadicea rejoined the 8th Escort Group and escorted Convoys JW 57, RA 58 and RA 59 to Russia from February through April. In preparation for Operation Overlord, the invasion of Normandy, she was transferred to Portsmouth where she escorted convoys arriving in England as well as the convoys across the Channel. Boadicea was sunk on 13 June off Portland Bill by German aircraft while escorting a convoy of merchant ships to France. Sources differ as to the weapons used and the aircraft that carried them; some say Fritz X missiles fired by Dornier Do 217s belonging to KG 100 or torpedoes dropped by Junkers Ju 88s. The weapons caused a magazine explosion and Boadicea sank quickly, with only 12 of her crew of 182 surviving.

The ship is included on the Chatham Naval Memorial; her wreck is 16 miles (26 km) southwest of the Isle of Portland at 50°25′41″N 02°45′57″W in 53 metres (174 ft) of water. Her bow is blown off forward of the engine rooms and her stern section is upright and reasonably intact. The wreck site is designated as a protected place under the Protection of Military Remains Act 1986.
