= SS Topa Topa =

- SS Topa Topa (1920), O/N 220421 (USSB 20–31), a Design 1013 ship built by Los Angeles Shipbuilding & Drydock Company in 1920. Torpedoed and sunk August 1942 by U-66.

Or SS Topa Topa may refer to one of two Type C2-S-E1 ships built by Gulf Shipbuilding for the United States Maritime Commission:

- SS Topa Topa (1943) (MC hull number 485), transferred to the United States Navy as the Hyades-class stores ship USS Graffias (AF-29); scrapped in 1974
- SS Topa Topa (1945) (MC hull number 1610), scrapped in 1973
