= Osborne Bay =

Coordinates: 50°45′18″N 1°15′29″W

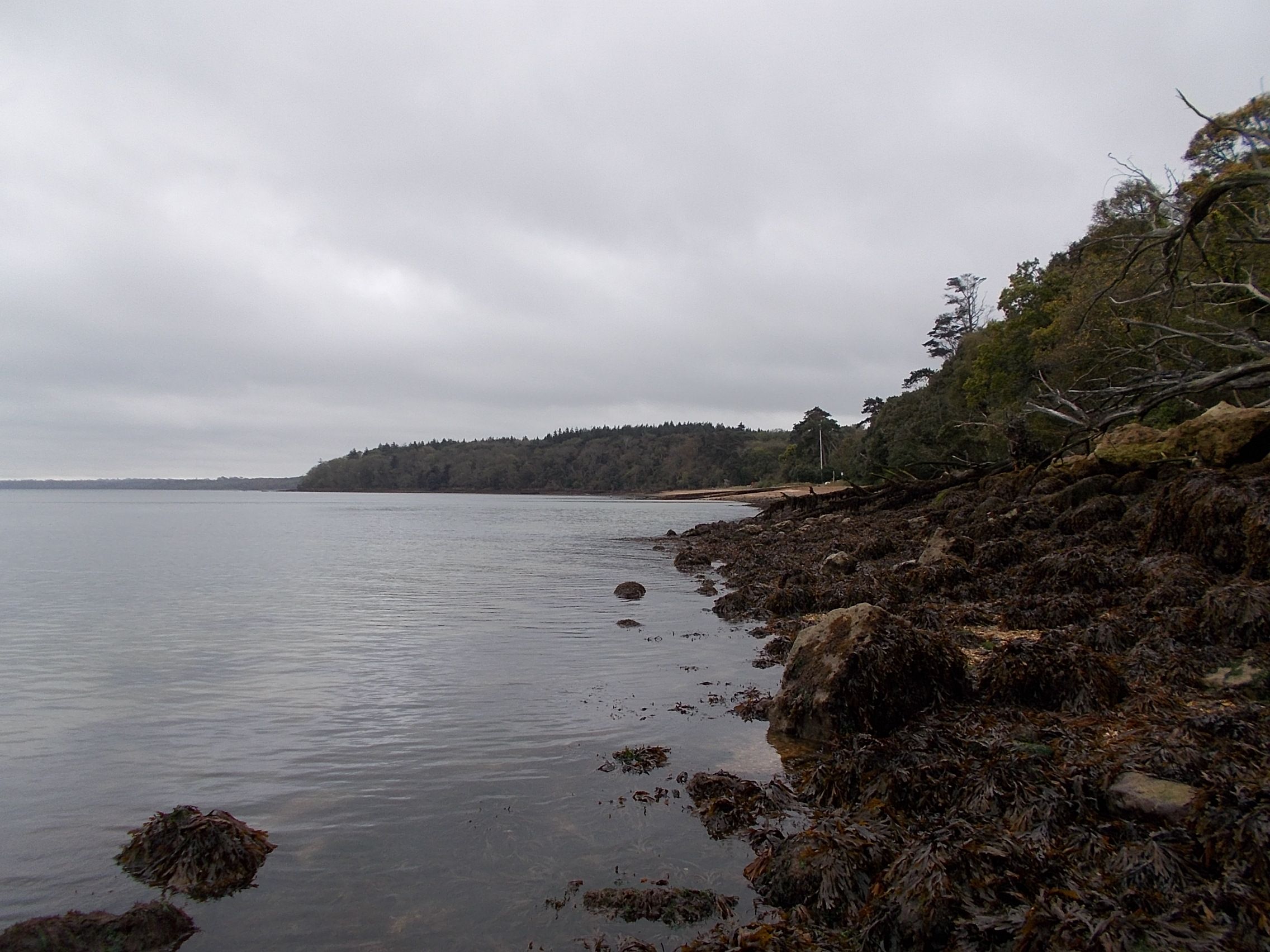
- The view at Osborne Bay

- Location within the Isle of Wight
- Civil parish: East Cowes
- Ceremonial county: Isle of Wight
- Region: South East
- Country: England
- Sovereign state: United Kingdom
- UK Parliament: Isle of Wight West

Osborne Bay is a bay on the north-east coast of the Isle of Wight, England, in the eastern arm of the Solent. It lies to the east of East Cowes and is 1 1/2 miles (2.4 km) from the entrance to the River Medina. Its shoreline is 3/4 mile (1.2 km) in length and is gently curving. It stretches from Old Castle Point in the west to Barton Point to the east. It is named for the neighbouring Osborne House estate on the shore, which owns the land facing the bay.

The bay has a beach, which is privately owned, is open to the public. It is around 300 yards long, and predominantly consists of shingle and sand. The seabed is a mixture of mud and sand, and is shallow up to around a 1/4 of a nautical mile out. In the summer, the bay is popular for yacht anchorage, being sheltered from the prevailing south-westerly winds, and can become very crowded.

== History ==
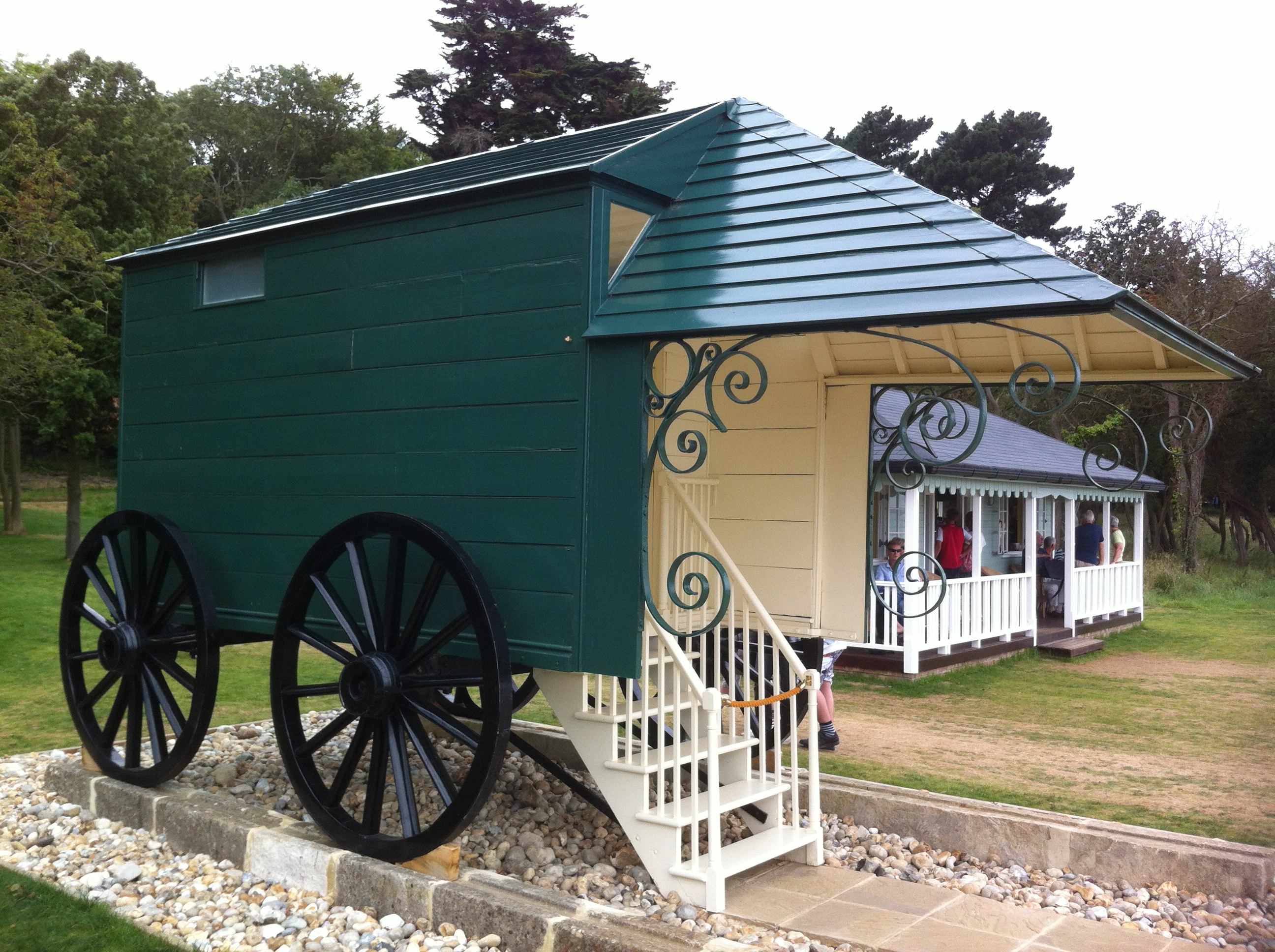
Queen Victoria's Bathing Machine from Osborne Bay

In 1845 Osborne House was bought by Queen Victoria and Prince Albert and became a popular retreat for them and the Royal Family to holiday. It was where her children learned to swim, and it the first place the Queen swam in the sea. As was popular at the time, she used an ornate Bathing machine to change and enter the water. After her death in 1901, the bathing machine was removed and the estate, including the bay, was gifted to the nation in 1902 by her successor, Edward VII.

The Royal Naval College, Osborne was later established on the estate. The beach was used for troop training before the D-Day landings; during these exercises, severe damage was done to the pavilion and piers on the bay.

The beach was first open to the public in summer 2012, and its owners, English Heritage, have a marine licence allowing there to be a marked swimming area for visitors.
