= SS Empire Brutus =

World War II merchant ship of the United Kingdom

History
- Name: Empire Brutus (1942–48); Vergmor (1948–50); Southgate (1950–55); Fatih (1955–68)
- Owner: Ministry of War Transport (1942–48); Haddon Steamship Co Ltd (1948–50); Turnbull, Scott Shipping Co Ltd (1950–55); Sadikzade Rusen Ogullari KS (1955–68)
- Operator: W. T. Gould & Co Ltd (1943–48); Haddon Steamship Co Ltd (1948–50); Turnbull, Scott Shipping Co Ltd (1950–55); Sadikzade Rusen Ogullari KS (1955–68)
- Port of registry: (United Kingdom) Sunderland (1943–48); (United Kingdom) London (1948–55); Turkey (1955–68)
- Builder: J. L. Thompson and Sons Ltd, Sunderland
- Yard number: 624
- Launched: 18 December 1942
- Completed: March 1943
- Out of service: February 1968
- Identification: UK Official Number 169111 (1943–55); Code Letters BFFY (1943–48)
- Fate: Scrapped

General characteristics
- Tonnage: 7,233 GRT; 4,294 NRT
- Length: 423 ft 8 in (129.13 m)
- Beam: 57 ft 2 in (17.42 m)
- Depth: 35 ft 9 in (10.90 m)
- Propulsion: 1 x triple expansion steam engine

Empire Brutus was a 7,233 GRT cargo ship which was built in 1941 by J. L. Thompson & Sons Ltd for the Ministry of War Transport (MoWT). Although twice damaged by enemy action, she survived the war. Postwar she was sold into merchant service, being renamed Vergmor, Southgate and Fatih, serving until scrapped in 1968.

== Description ==
Empire Brutus was built by J. L. Thompson & Sons Ltd, Sunderland. She was yard number 624. Launched on 18 December 1942, she was completed in March 1943.

The ship was 423 feet 8 inches (129.13 m) long, with a beam of 57 feet 2 inches (17.42 m) and a depth of 35 feet 9 inches (10.90 m). She was propelled by a triple expansion steam engine which had cylinders of 24 1/2 inches (62 cm), 39 inches (99 cm) and 70 inches (180 cm) bore by 48 inches (120 cm) stroke. The engine was built by the Central Marine Engine Company (1938) Ltd, Newcastle upon Tyne. She had a GRT of 7,233 with a NRT of 4,294.

== Career ==
=== Wartime ===
Empire Brutus's port of registry was Sunderland. She was operated under the management of W. T. Gould. On 26 July 1943, Empire Brutus was damaged by enemy bombing 197 nautical miles (365 km) west of Cape Caroeiro, Portugal (39°50′N 13°38′W). It took five days for Empire Samson to tow her the 230 nautical miles (430 km) to Lisbon at 2 knots (3.7 km/h). She was on a voyage from Newport, Wales to Algiers and Bougie, Algeria laden with ammunition, bombs and trucks.

Empire Brutus was a member of Convoy MKS 43G, which departed Gibraltar on 22 March 1944 bound for the United Kingdom. and Loch Ewe on 10 September. It dispersed at sea on 15 September. She was carrying general cargo. On 8 July 1944, Empire Brutus struck a mine 6 nautical miles (11 km) off Arromanches, France (49°27′N 00°29′W) and was damaged when on a voyage from Juno Beach to Southend-on-Sea in ballast. She was beached on Juno Beach. The following day, she was refloated and towed to Middlesbrough for repairs. Empire Brutus was a member of Convoy MKS 101G, which departed Gibraltar on 15 May 1945 bound for the United Kingdom. Empire Brutus was carrying a cargo of wheat. Those killed whilst serving on Empire Brutus during World War II are commemorated at the Tower Hill Memorial, London.

=== Postwar ===
In 1948, Empire Brutus was sold to the Haddon Steamship Co Ltd, London and renamed Vergmor. In 1950, she was sold to the Turnbull, Scott Shipping Co Ltd and was renamed Southgate, serving with them for five years. In 1950, Southgate was sold to Sadikzade Rusen Ogullari KS, Turkey and renamed Fatih. She served until 1968. Fatih was scrapped at Istanbul in February 1968.

== Official Numbers and Code Letters ==
Official Numbers were a forerunner to IMO Numbers. Empire Brutus, Vergmor and Southgate had the UK Official Number 169111. Empire Brutus used the Code Letters BFFY.
