= HMS Chiddingfold (L31) =

Destroyer of the Royal Navy

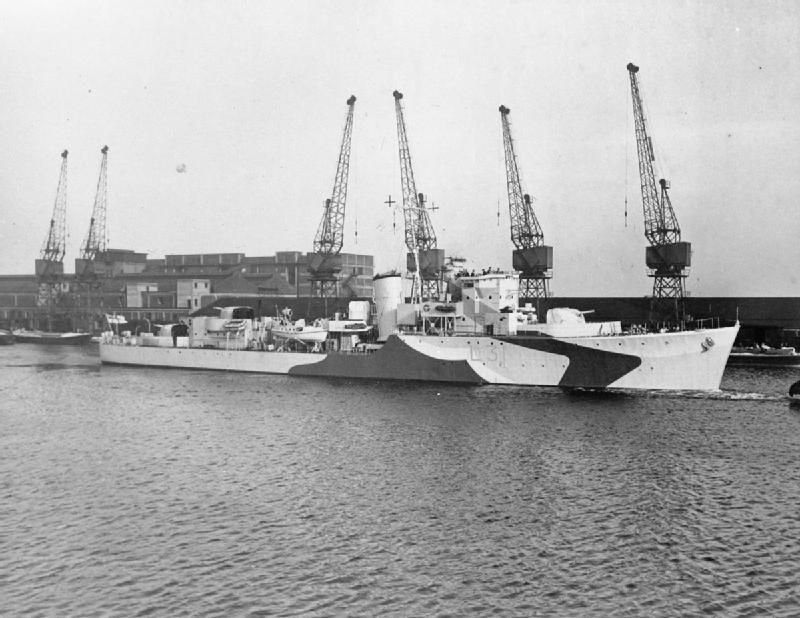
- HMS Chiddingfold on completion

History

United Kingdom
- Name: HMS Chiddingfold
- Ordered: 4 September 1939
- Builder: Scotts at Greenock
- Laid down: 1 March 1940
- Launched: 10 March 1941
- Commissioned: 16 October 1941
- Identification: Pennant number:L31
- Fate: Sold to Indian Navy

India
- Name: INS Ganga
- Namesake: Ganga River (the Ganges)
- Acquired: April 1952
- Commissioned: 18 June 1953
- Decommissioned: 1975
- Identification: D94
- Fate: Scrapped

General characteristics
- Class & type: Type II Hunt-class destroyer
- Displacement: 1,050 long tons (1,070 t) standard; 1,430 long tons (1,450 t) full load
- Length: 85.3 m (279 ft 10 in) o/a
- Beam: 9.6 m (31 ft 6 in)
- Draught: 2.51 m (8 ft 3 in)
- Propulsion: 2 Admiralty 3-drum boilers; 2 shaft Parsons geared turbines, 19,000 shp
- Speed: 27 knots (31 mph; 50 km/h); 25.5 kn (29.3 mph; 47.2 km/h) full
- Range: 3,600 nmi (6,700 km) at 14 kn (26 km/h)
- Complement: 164
- Armament: 6 × QF 4 in Mark XVI guns on twin mounts Mk. XIX; 4 × QF 2 pdr Mk. VIII on quad mount MK.VII; 2 × 20 mm Oerlikons on single mounts P Mk. III; 110 depth charges, 2 throwers, 3 racks

HMS Chiddingfold (L31) was a Type II Hunt-class destroyer of the Royal Navy. She was leased to the Indian Navy in 1952 where she served as INS Ganga (D94).

== Construction and design ==
Chiddingfold was one of 17 Hunt-class destroyers ordered from various shipbuilders on 4 September 1939. The Hunts were meant to fill the Royal Navy's need for a large number of small destroyer-type vessels capable of both convoy escort and operations with the fleet. The Type II Hunts differed from the earlier ships in having increased beam in order to improve stability (Note: A design error caused the first Hunt, Atherstone to be dangerously unstable when built. The first 23 Hunts had a twin 4-inch mount removed, the ships' superstructure cut down and ballast fitted in order to restore adequate stability.) and carry the ships' originally intended armament.

Chiddingfold was laid down at Scotts Shipbuilding and Engineering Company's shipyard at Greenock on the River Clyde on 1 March 1940 as Job No. J1115, was launched on 10 March 1941, and was completed on 16 October that year. Chiddingfold was the first ship of the Royal Navy to have that name, and was named after the fox hunt at Petworth, Sussex.

Chiddingfold was 264 feet 3 inches (80.54 m) long between perpendiculars and 280 feet (85.34 m) overall. The ship's beam was 31 feet 6 inches (9.60 m) and draught 7 feet 9 inches (2.36 m). Displacement was 1,050 long tons (1,070 t) standard and 1,490 long tons (1,510 t) under full load. Two Admiralty boilers raising steam at 300 pounds per square inch (2,100 kPa) and 620 °F (327 °C) fed Parsons single-reduction geared steam turbines that drove two propeller shafts, generating 19,000 shaft horsepower (14,000 kW) at 380 rpm. This gave a speed of 27 knots (50 km/h; 31 mph). Fuel capacity was 277 long tons (281 t) of oil, giving a design range of 2,560 nautical miles (4,740 km; 2,950 mi) (although in service use, this dropped to 1,550 nautical miles (2,870 km; 1,780 mi)).

The ship's main gun armament was six 4 inch (102 mm) QF Mk XVI dual purpose (anti-ship and anti-aircraft) guns in three twin mounts, with one mount forward and two aft. Additional close-in anti-aircraft armament was provided by a quadruple 2-pounder "pom-pom" mount and two single Oerlikon 20 mm cannon mounted in the bridge wings. Power-operated twin 20 mm Oerlikon mounts replaced the single Oerlikons during the war. Up to 110 depth charges could be carried. (Note: While Lenton and Friedman both state a capacity of 110 depth charges, Gardiner and Chesneau give a capacity of 30 or 60 charges.) The ship had a complement of 168 officers and men.

== History in the Royal Navy ==
She earned battle honours in World War II for Norway, 1941 and English Channel, 1945.

Chiddingfold's work up was interrupted when the destroyer took part in Operation Archery, a Combined Operations raid on the German-occupied Norwegian islands of Vågsøy and Måløy. Chiddingfold shelled shore targets during the landings on 27 December 1941, and, together with the destroyer Offa, sank the freighter Anhalt and the armed trawler Donner. After completing working up, Chiddingfold joined Orkney and Shetland Command, being employed on escort and patrol duties as far north as Iceland and down to the Clyde. From 15 to 18 December 1942, the ship formed part of the escort for Convoy JW 51A, accompanying the convoy from Loch Ewe to 66 degrees N, before handing over to the ocean escort.

On 22 December 1942, Chiddingfold left Loch Ewe with the next Arctic Convoy, Convoy JW 51B, leaving the convoy on 25 December. An attempt by German surface forces to attack the convoy led to the Battle of the Barents Sea on 31 December 1942. Chiddingfold was refitted at Middlesbrough from 18 June to 21 August 1943, before being transferred to the Mediterranean Fleet, joining the 59th Destroyer Division based at Malta. In June 1944, she transferred to the 22nd Destroyer Flotilla, also based at Malta. On 1 March 1945, the destroyer took part in a bombardment of Genoa, before leaving for British waters. She served with the 16th Destroyer Flotilla based at Harwich until the end of the war in Europe. In June 1945, Chiddingfold was refitted on the Thames in preparation for service with the East Indies Fleet. Chiddingfold was part of the escorting forces for Operation Zipper, the British landings in Malaya in September 1945. She left Trincomalee, Ceylon (now Sri Lanka) on 4 September 1945 and arriving at the landing beaches on 9 September.

Chiddingfold returned to Portsmouth in November 1945, and was reduced to Category B Reserve status on 25 March 1946. (Note: The Reserve Fleet was divided into Category A of new ships where crews were not available or were not required for immediate service, Category B Reserve consisted of ships that were being retained and Category C Reserve held ships that were unlikely to be needed for service.) In 1950 she was transferred to Harwich and remained there until June 1952 when the ship was to be loaned to India. In July 1952 the ship was towed to Liverpool for a refit.

== History in the Indian Navy ==
The lease of Chiddingfold to India was announced on 17 June 1952. She underwent a refit by Messrs Crichton at Liverpool which was completed in June 1953. She was commissioned as INS Ganga on 18 June 1953. The lease was extended in August 1956, and she was sold to India in April 1958. Along with two other Hunt-class destroyers in Indian service (Godavari and Gomati), she constituted the 22nd Destroyer Squadron. She was deployed as a training ship until 1975, when she was struck from the active list, before being sold for scrapping.

== Bibliography ==
- Blackman, Raymond V. B. (1963). Jane's Fighting Ships 1963−64. London: Sampson Low, Marston & Co. Ltd. OCLC 815472274.
- Colledge, J. J.; Warlow, Ben (2006) [1969]. Ships of the Royal Navy: The Complete Record of All Fighting Ships of the Royal Navy from the 15th Century to the Present (3rd Rev ed.). London: Chatham Publishing. ISBN 978-1-86176-281-8. OCLC 67375475.
- Critchley, Mike (1982). British Warships Since 1945: Part 3: Destroyers. Liskeard: Maritime Books. ISBN 0-9506323-9-2.
- English, John (1987). The Hunts: A history of the design, development and careers of the 86 destroyers of this class built for the Royal and Allied Navies during World War II. Kendal: World Ship Society. ISBN 0-905617-44-4.
- Friedman, Norman (2008). British Destroyers and Frigates: The Second World War and After. Barnsley: Seaforth Publishing. ISBN 978-1-84832-015-4.
- Gardiner, Robert; Chesneau, Roger, eds. (1980). Conway's All The World's Fighting Ships 1922–1946. London: Conway Maritime Press. ISBN 0-85177-146-7.
- Lenton, H. T. (1970). Navies of the Second World War: British Fleet & Escort Destroyers Volume Two. London: Macdonald & Co. ISBN 0-356-03122-5.
- Rohwer, Jürgen; Hümmelchen, Gerhard (1992). Chronology of the War at Sea 1939–1945. London: Greenhill Books. ISBN 1-85367-117-7.
- Ruegg, Bob; Hague, Arnold (1993). Convoys to Russia 1941–1945. Kendal: World Ship Society. ISBN 0-905617-66-5.
- Whitley, M. J. (2000). Destroyers of World War Two: An International Encyclopedia. London: Cassell & Co. ISBN 1-85409-521-8.
- Winser, John de S. (2002). British Invasion Fleets: The Mediterranean and beyond 1942–1945. Gravesend: World Ship Society. ISBN 09543310-0-1.
