= Convoy HX 79 =

Convoy during naval battles of the Second World War

Convoy HX.79
- Part of the Battle of the Atlantic in the Second World War
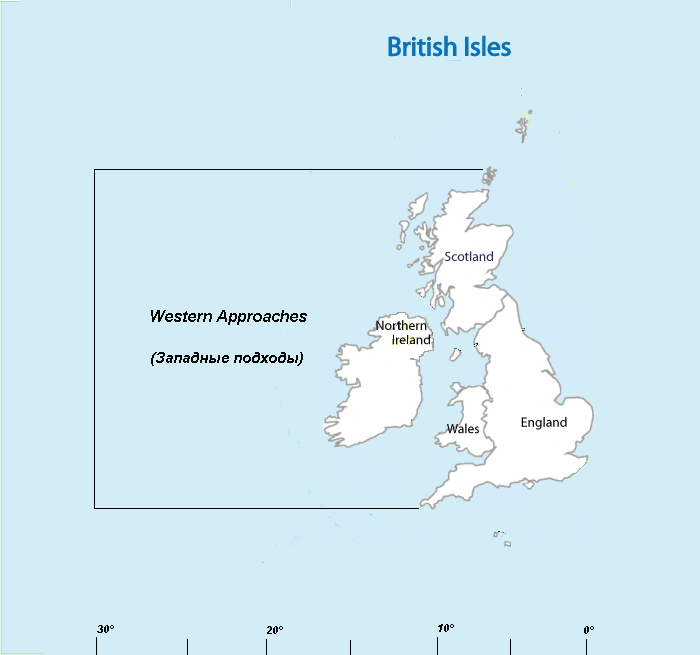
- Diagram of the area of the Western Approaches
Date	19–20 October 1940
Location	Western Approaches
Result	German victory

Belligerents
Kriegsmarine	Royal Navy

Commanders and leaders
Admiral Karl Dönitz	

Strength
5 U-boats	49 ships (1 early return); 17 escorts (11 during attack)

Casualties and losses
None	12 ships sunk 1 damaged

HX 79 was an Allied convoy in the North Atlantic of the HX series, which sailed east from Halifax, Nova Scotia. The convoy took place during the Battle of the Atlantic in the Second World War. One ship dropped out and returned to port, leaving 49 to cross the Atlantic for Liverpool. Two armed merchant cruisers and a submarine escorted the convoy to protect it from German commerce raiders.

The oceanic escorts detached from the convoy at noon on 18 October, in the Western Approaches, where Convoy SC 7 had been attacked by a Wolfpack on the night of 18/19 October, which sank many ships and scattered the survivors. The Admiralty sent the ten ships and a submarine escorting Convoy OB 229 to defend Convoy HX 79, which arrived from 8:00 a.m. to noon on 19 October.

During the night of 19/20 October, U-boats attacked the convoy and sank twelve ships. The convoy escorts were inexperienced and not trained in common anti-submarine tactics, the four corvettes were new and crewed with inexperienced wartime recruits; the submarine got in the way and was attacked twice by the ships. The U-boats, having expended their torpedoes, turned for home.

German military communiqués exaggerated the results of the attacks on Convoys SC 7 and HX 79, claiming an even greater victory than the one achieved. The British began to revise their tactics and organisation, creating permanent escort groups and hurrying the provision of new equipment like R/T for anti-submarine ships and aircraft to communicate.

== Background ==
=== U-boats ===
Rockall, Rockall Bank and the North Channel

From 22 September the U-boats U-29, U-43, U-31, U-32, U-46, U-37, U-38, U-137 and U-123 were to pick off ships sailing independently and attack convoys in the area between the North Channel and the Rockall Bank. The first attempt to intercept a convoy with a line of U-boats on 7 October failed but several independents were sunk, including three from Convoy SC 6.

=== Convoy SC 7 ===
SC 7 was a slow convoy which departed Sydney on 5 October 1940, ahead of the faster Convoy HX 79, bound for Liverpool with 34 ships. On 17 October, four of the ships had straggled and it had been met by the sloops HMS Scarborough and Fowey with the corvette HMS Bluebell. The U-boat U-48 sank two ships before Coastal Command flying boats forced the U-boat to withdraw.

=== Convoy HX 79 ===
Convoy HX 79 was an east-bound convoy which sailed from Halifax on 8 October 1940 making for Liverpool. Twenty ships joined at Halifax, nineteen from Sydney, Nova Scotia and then ten ships from Bermuda, one ship dropped out and returned early. The meagre ocean escort of the armed merchant cruisers HMS Alaunia and Montclare with the Netherlands submarine HNLMS O 14 accompanied the convoy in case of attack by a surface raider.

== Prelude ==
=== Attack on Convoy SC 7 ===
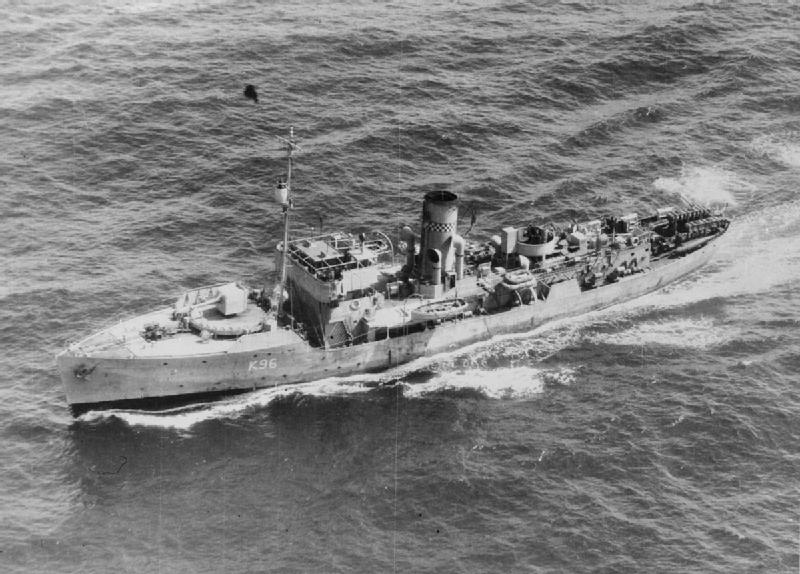
HMS Aubrietia, an example of a flower-class corvette

Having received the sighting report from U-48, Admiral Karl Dönitz, the Befehlshaber der U-Boote (Commander, U-boats) established another patrol line with U-101, U-46, U-123, U-99, U-100. During the night of 17/18 October U-38 attacked twice, sinking one ship before being forced to retire by the corvette HMS Heartsease, which, with the sloop HMS Leith, had joined the convoy. Later in the evening, the convoy reached the U-boat patrol line and the escorts present, Leith, Fowey and Bluebell were unable to challenge U-101, U-46, U-99 (attacking from inside the convoy), U-123 and U-100 which overwhelmed the convoy escorts with massed attacks and sank sixteen ships, damaged one and scattered the survivors.

On 19 October, the 49 ships of Convoy HX 79 entered the Western Approaches, where the slow Convoy SC 7 had been attacked. In the late morning of 19 October Alaunia and Montclare turned west, handing over Convoy HX 79 to the 1st Escort Group (1st EG). The Admiralty expected an attack on Convoy HX 79 after the disaster befalling Convoy SC 7 and sent the 1st EG, the escorts of Convoy OB 229, to reinforce the convoy; eleven ships arrived from 8:00 a.m. until noon. The escort group consisted of the destroyers HMS Whitehall (Lieutenant-Commander Archibald Russell, escort leader) and Sturdy, the minesweeper HMS Jason, the corvettes HMS Hibiscus, Heliotrope, Coreopsis and Arabis with the anti-submarine trawlers HMT Lady Elsa, Blackfly and Angle. The submarine HNLMS O 21 had also joined during the morning of 19 October.

== Action ==
=== Day: 19 October ===
Cross-section of a type VIIC U-boat

Convoy HX 79 was sighted by U-47 (Kapitänleutnant Günther Prien) Prien transmitted a sighting report and shadowed the convoy. The U-boats U-99, U-101 and U-123 had fired all their torpedoes in the attack on Convoy SC 7 and sailed for home; those still operational were directed to the scene; U-100 (Joachim Schepke), U-46 (Engelbert Endrass) and U-28 which had failed to reach Convoy SC 7 in time and U-38 (Heinrich Liebe) and U-48 (Heinrich Bleichrodt) were guided to Convoy HX 79 by U-47, joining during the day. U-boats which failed to reach Convoy HX 79 in time continued to attack ships sailing independently. At the back of the port column, the British Brocklebank liner Matheran was torpedoed by U-38 outside the convoy. The torpedo hit No. 3 hold and the ship sank in seven minutes, with its cargo of 3,000 long tons (3,000 t) of iron and 1,200 long tons (1,200 t) of zinc, grain, machinery and general cargo. Captain J. Greenhall and eight crew were killed; 72 men abandoned ship and were picked up later by Loch Lomond, which was acting as a rescue ship.

U-38 entered the convoy and six minutes later fired a second salvo of torpedoes at the Maclay & McIntyre tramp Uganda in the third column, carrying 2,006 long tons (2,038 t) of steel and 6,200 long tons (6,300 t) of wood. Only one lifeboat was not destroyed by the explosion but there were no casualties, Captain C. Mackinnon and the 39 crew being rescued by Jason. U-47 attacked, also on the surface, sinking first the Dutch Holland–Amerika Lijn general cargo-vessel, Bilderdijk, loaded with 8,640 long tons (8,780 t) of grain and general cargo, the crew of 39 men surviving. Having sunk the second vessel in column two, U-47 torpedoed the Baltic Trading Company vessel, Shirak, the sixth ship in the second column, carrying 7,771 long tons (7,896 t) of petroleum products. The crew abandoned ship and Captain L. R. Morrison with his crew were rescued by Blackfly; as the convoy sailed on, U-48 finished Shirak off. U-47 attacked the new Ropner tramp steamer Wandby, on its first journey, with 1,700 long tons (1,700 t) of lead, zinc and 7,200 long tons (7,300 t) of wood from Vancouver; the crew being rescued by Angle. Wandby sank slowly, going down on 21 October.

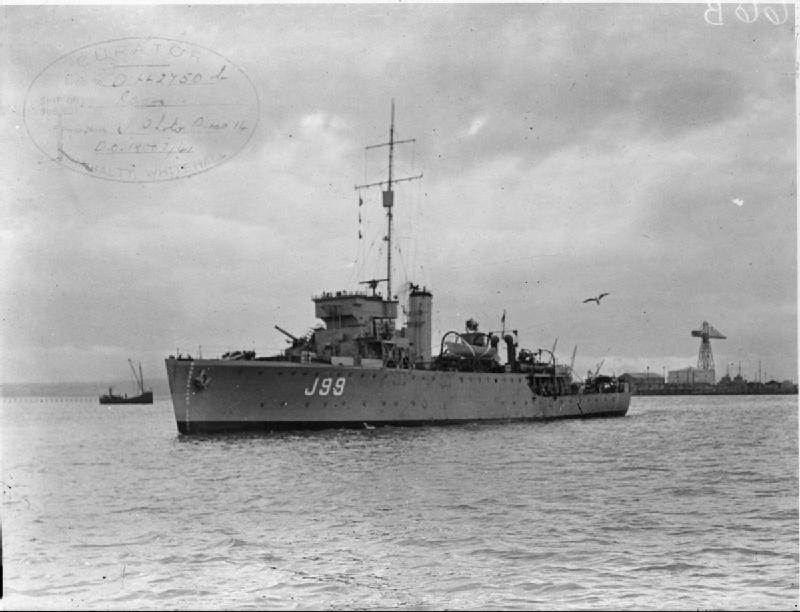
The Halcyon-class minesweeper HMS Jason, photographed in 1941

U-46 had also fired at Wandby and close to midnight torpedoed the British tramp steamer Ruperra full of steel scrap and aircraft, the ship sinking quickly with the captain, D. T. Davies, 29 crew members and a naval gunner being killed; seven men were rescued by Induna. U-100 sank two tankers of the British Anglo-Saxon Petroleum Company. Caprella (Captain P. Prior, from Curaçao with a cargo of 11,300 long tons (11,500 t) of heavy fuel oil .was hit at 11:15 p.m. The fuel did not explode but the torpedo hit it between the bridge and the engine room, breaking the ship's back. Lifeboats amidships and aft were lowered, without the chief officer, who had been on the bridge and was killed by the torpedo explosion. As Captain Prior and his crew abandoned ship, they could see Shirak burning nearby. The 52 survivors were picked up by Lady Elsa after about two hours. U-100 attacked Sitala, also bound for Stanlow with 8,444 long tons (8,580 t) of crude oil, killing a member of the engine-room staff; Captain J. L. Morgans and 42 crew were rescued by Lady Elsa.

=== Night 19/20 October ===
It was now after midnight, and Prien fired at Buries Markes's cargo-vessel La Estancia. Again one man below was lost, along with the 8,333 long tons (8,467 t) of sugar. Captain J. Meneely, 24 members of the crew and a passenger were rescued by Coreopsis and seven men taken on by Induna. U-47 still on the surface, torpedoed Whitford Point at the back of the convoy, carrying 7,840 long tons (7,970 t) of steel and sinking quickly with the Captain J. E. Young and 35 men; a survivor was rescued by Sturdy. After stopping to rescue the survivors of Matheran, the Maclay & McIntyre ship, Loch Lomond, carrying 6,000 long tons (6,100 t) of wood and 1,858 long tons (1,888 t) of steel, was attacked and sunk by U-100. Captain W. J. Park, the 38 crew and the survivors from Matheran were picked up by Jason. A straggler, the Swedish Johnson Line oil-tanker, Janus, a new 9,965 GRT ship, was sunk by U-46. Janus was the last ship of Convoy HX 79 to be sunk but U-47 damaged the tanker Athelmonarch, which made port. Convoy HX 79 arrived at Liverpool without further loss on 23 October. The convoy had lost twelve ships out of 49, with a tonnage of 75,069 gross register tons (GRT) for no loss to the U-boats.

== Aftermath ==
=== Analysis ===
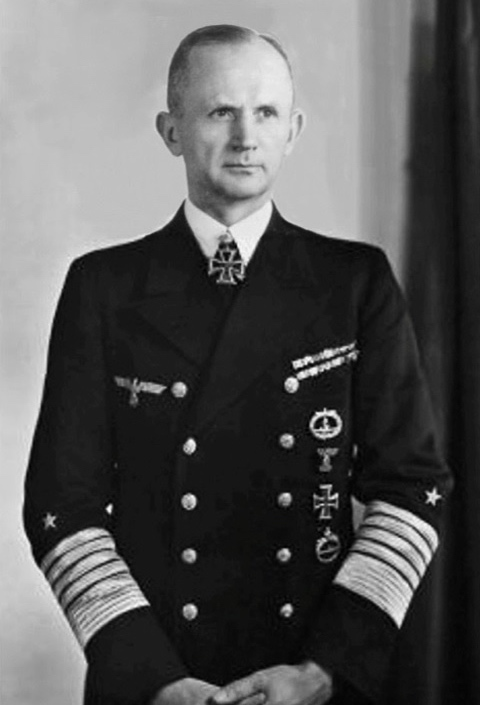
Photograph of Karl Dönitz, Konteradmiral (rear admiral) and Commander of the Submarines (Befehlshaber der Unterseeboote BdU)

Based on short signals and the confusion of massed night attacks, Dönitz at U-boat headquarters in Paris announced exaggerated figures for ships sunk, some later being amended after U-boat crews returned and gave more detailed accounts. Seventeen sinkings were claimed against a post-war analysis by Jurgen Rohwer of twelve ships sunk. Despite the number of escorts, their anti-submarine effort had been ineffective; the ships were uncoordinated, the four corvettes were new, with inexperienced hostilities-only crews, the ships were not used to working together and used different tactics. The escorts had arrived singly and command went to the senior officer present and could change if a new arrival was commanded by a more senior officer.

Tactics had to be made on the spot and communicated by signal lamp to each ship. The failure of the escort led to a number of changes in policy. Permanent escort groups were formed with a leader, allowing consistent tactics and better teamwork. In the German semi-official history, "Germany and the Second World War" (2015), Bernd Stegemann wrote that the U-boats had their best success per-day-at-sea in October 1940, a period that the submariners called the Happy Time. During the winter of 1940–1941 the U-boats had less success, due to the seasonal weather, the British–US destroyers-for-bases deal, the arrival of more corvettes, the addition of radar sets and radio-telephones to British destroyers and the slow increase in the number of Coastal Command aircraft.

=== Casualties ===
Amongst the casualties, Caprella suffered one man killed and 51 survivors, Matheran suffered nine men killed, thirty men were killed and seven survived on Ruperra, one man was killed and 43 survived on Sitara and there were three survivors and 36 men killed on Whitford Point. The U-Boats sank 21 ships of 79,592 GRT in Convoy SC 7 and stragglers; the U-boats then sank 12 ships in Convoy HX 79 of 75,069 GRT** and damaged a tanker. The six GRT discrepancy in the U-boat claims table is accounted for by it coming from an edition of Axis Submarine Successes 1939–1945 (1983) by Jürgen Rohwer and the larger figure being taken from Chronology of the War at Sea (2005) by Rohwer and Hümmelchen.

=== Tonnage lost ===
List of tonnage sunk from Convoy SC 7, Convoy HX 79, stragglers and scattered ships
U-boat	Flag	Sunk	GRT	Notes
U-48	Kriegsmarine	6	37,083	1 damaged by U-47 (6,032 GRT)
U-101	Kriegsmarine	4	14,562	1 shared with U-100 and U-123 (4,155 GRT), 1 damaged with U-100 (5,458 GRT)
U-93	Kriegsmarine	3	13,214	
U-124	Kriegsmarine	5	20,061	
U-46	Kriegsmarine	5	22,966	1 shared with U-47 (4,947 GRT)
U-99	Kriegsmarine	6	27,396	1 shared with U-123 (4,144 GRT)
U-100	Kriegsmarine	3	19,900	1 shared with U-101 and U-123 (4,155 GRT), 1 damaged with U-101 (5,458 GRT)
U-47	Kriegsmarine	3	17,065	1 shared with U-48 (6,023 GRT), 1 shared with U-46 (4,947 GRT), 1 damaged (8,995 GRT)

=== U-boat claims ===
U-boat HQ claims against Convoy HX 79 and post-war analysis
	Captain	Flag	Dönitz	GRT	Rohwer	GRT
U-38	Heinrich Liebe	Kriegsmarine	2	13,000	2	12,619
U-46	Engelbert Endrass	Kriegsmarine	3	23,000	2½*	16,987
U-47	Günter Prien	Kriegsmarine	8	50,500	4	22,552
U-48	Heinrich Bleichrodt	Kriegsmarine	1	7,000	½*	3,011
U-100	Joachim Schepke	Kriegsmarine	3	19,600	3	19,894
Totals	* shared with U-48		17	113,100	12	**75,063

== Orders of battle ==
=== Allied merchant ships ===
Convoyed ships
Name	Year	Flag	GRT	Notes
Athelmonarch	1928	Merchant Navy	8,995	Damaged U-47, 0†
Atland	1910	Sweden	5,203	
Axel Johnson	1925	Sweden	4,915	Sailed Sydney, Nova Scotia
Baron Carnegie	1925	Merchant Navy	3,178	Sailed Sydney, Nova Scotia
Benwood	1910	Norway	3,931	Sailed Sydney, Nova Scotia
Biafra	1933	Merchant Navy	5,405	
Bilderdijk	1922	Netherlands	6,856	Sunk U-47, 0†
Blairnevis	1930	Merchant Navy	4,155	Sailed Sydney, Nova Scotia
Brittany	1928	Merchant Navy	4,772	Sailed Sydney, Nova Scotia
Cadillac	1917	Merchant Navy	12,062	
Cairnvalona	1918	Merchant Navy	4,929	Sailed Sydney, Nova Scotia
Campus	1925	Merchant Navy	3,667	Sailed Sydney, Nova Scotia
Cape Corso	1929	Merchant Navy	3,807	
Caprella	1931	Merchant Navy	8,230	Sunk U-100 1†, 51 survivors
City Of Lancaster	1924	Merchant Navy	3,041	
Egda	1939	Norway	10,050	
Empire Swan	1921	Merchant Navy	7,964	
Empire Trader	1908	Merchant Navy	9,990	Ex-Convoy BHX 79
Enseigne Maurice Prehac	1924	Merchant Navy	4,578	Sailed Sydney, Nova Scotia
Erna III	1930	Merchant Navy	1,590	Returned early
Flowergate	1911	Merchant Navy	5,161	
Gunda	1930	Sweden	1,770	
Harbury	1933	Merchant Navy	5,081	
Harlesden	1932	United Kingdom	5,483	
Hoyanger	1926	Norway	4,624	Ex-Convoy BHX 79
Induna	1925	Merchant Navy	5,086	Sailed Sydney, Nova Scotia
Janus	1939	Sweden	9,965	Sunk U-46, 0†
Kiruna	1921	Sweden	5,484	Sailed Sydney, Nova Scotia
La Estancia	1940	Merchant Navy	5,185	Ex-Convoy BHX 79, Sunk U-47
Loch Lomond	1934	Merchant Navy	5,452	Sailed Sydney, Nova Scotia, sunk U-100, 33†, 72 surv, rescued Jason
Marathon	1919	Greece	7,926	
Matheran	1919	Merchant Navy	7,653	Sunk U-38, 9†
Ravnefjell	1938	Norway	1,339	Sailed Sydney, Nova Scotia
Rio Blanco	1922	Merchant Navy	4,086	Sailed Sydney, Nova Scotia
Ruperra	1925	Merchant Navy	4,548	Sailed Sydney, Nova Scotia, sunk by U-46, 30† 7 surv
Rydboholm	1933	Sweden	3,197	
Salacia	1937	Merchant Navy	5,495	
San Roberto	1922	Merchant Navy	5,890	
Sandanger	1938	Norway	9,432	
Shirak	1926	Merchant Navy	6,023	Ex-Convoy BHX 79, sunk by U-47, U-48, 0†
Sir Ernest Cassel	1910	Sweden	7,739	Sailed Sydney, Nova Scotia
Sitala	1937	Merchant Navy	6,218	Ex-Convoy BHX 79, sunk by U-100, 1†, 43 surv
Thyra	1920	Norway	1,655	Sailed Sydney, Nova Scotia
Tiba	1938	Netherlands	5,239	Sailed Sydney, Nova Scotia
Tribesman	1937	Merchant Navy	6,242	Ex-Convoy BHX 79
Triton	1930	Norway	6,607	Ex-Convoy BHX 79
Uganda	1927	Merchant Navy	4,966	Sailed Sydney, Nova Scotia, sunk U-38
Wandby	1940	Merchant Navy	4,947	Ex-Convoy BHX 79, U-47, 0†, sank 21 October
Wellington Court	1930	Merchant Navy	4,979	Sailed Sydney, Nova Scotia
Whitford Point	1928	Merchant Navy	5,026	Sunk U-47, 36†, 3 surv

=== Escorts ===
Convoy escorts (some in relays)
Name	Flag	Type	Period	Notes
HMT Angle	Royal Navy	ASW trawler	19 October 1940	
HMS Arabis	Royal Navy	Flower-class corvette	19–23 October 1940	
HMT Blackfly	Royal Navy	ASW trawler	19 October 1940	
HMS Coreopsis	Royal Navy	Flower-class corvette	19–22 October 1940	
HMCS French	Royal Canadian Navy	Armed yacht	8–9 October 1940	
HMS Heliotrope	Royal Navy	Flower-class corvette	19–23 October 1940	
HMS Hibiscus	Royal Navy	Flower-class corvette	19–23 October 1940	
HMCS Husky	Royal Canadian Navy	Armed yacht	9–10 October 1940	
HMS Jason	Royal Navy	Halcyon-class minesweeper	9 October 1940	
HMS/HMT Lady Elsa	Royal Navy	ASW trawler	19 October 1940	
HMS Montclare	Royal Navy	Armed merchant cruiser	9–18 October 1940	
HNLMS O 14	Royal Netherlands Navy	O 12-class submarine	9–18 October 1940	
HMCS Reindeer	Royal Canadian Navy	Armed yacht	9–10 October 1940	
HMCS Saguenay	Royal Canadian Navy	River-class destroyer	8–9 October 1940	
HMS Sardonyx	Royal Navy	S-class destroyer	20 October 1940	
HMS Sturdy	Royal Navy	S-class destroyer	19 October 1940	
HMS Whitehall	Royal Navy	Modified W-class destroyer	19–21 October 1940	

=== U-boats ===
U-boats attacking Convoy HX 79
	Captain	Flag	Type	Notes
U-38	Heinrich Liebe	Kriegsmarine	Type IX submarine	
U-46	Engelbert Endrass	Kriegsmarine	Type VIIB submarine	Damaged by RAF on return journey, 1 killed.
U-47	Günther Prien	Kriegsmarine	Type VIIB submarine	
U-48	Heinrich Bleichrodt	Kriegsmarine	Type VIIB submarine	
U-100	Joachim Schepke	Kriegsmarine	Type VIIB submarine	

== Bibliography ==
- Blair, Clay (2000) [1996]. Hitler's U-boat War: The Hunters, 1939–1942 (Modern Library Paperback, NYC ed.). New York City: Random House. ISBN 978-0-307-87437-5.
- Edwards, Bernard (2011). The Wolf Packs Gather: Mayhem in the Western Approaches 1940. Barnsley: Pen & Sword Maritime. ISBN 978-1-84468-271-3.
- Hague, Arnold (2000). The Allied Convoy System 1939–1945. London: Chatham. ISBN 1-86176-147-3.
- Maier, Klaus A.; Rohde, Horst; Stegemann, Bernd; Umbreit, Hans (2015) [1991]. Falla, P. S. (ed.). Germany and the Second World War: Germany's Initial Conquests in Europe. Vol. II. Translated by McMurry, Dean S.; Osers, Ewald (trans. pbk. Clarendon Press, Oxford ed.). Freiburg im Breisgau: Militärgeschichtliches Forschungsamt [Research Institute for Military History]. ISBN 978-0-19-873834-3.
  - Stegemann, Bernd. "Part VI The Battle for Hegemony in Western Europe. Part VIII The Second Phase of the War at Sea (until the Spring of 1941) I. The Submarine War". In Maier et al. (2015).
- Milner, Marc (2011) [1985]. Battle of the Atlantic (e-book ed.). Stroud: Spellmount. ISBN 978-0-75246646-0. First published as North Atlantic Run: The Royal Canadian Navy and the Battle for the Convoys (1985) University of Toronto Press.
- Rohwer, Jürgen; Hümmelchen, Gerhard (2005). Chronology of the War at Sea 1939–1945: The Naval History of World War Two (3rd rev. ed.). Annapolis, Maryland: Naval Institute Press. ISBN 1-59114-119-2.
- Woodman, Richard (2013) [2004]. The Real Cruel Sea: The Merchant Navy in the Battle of the Atlantic 1939–1943 (3rd (repr.) Pen & Sword Maritime, Barnsley ed.). London: John Murray. ISBN 978-1-84884-415-5.
