= U47 =

U47 may refer to:

== Naval vessels ==
- German submarine U-47, various vessels
- HMS Fleetwood (U47), a sloop of the Royal Navy
- SM U-47 (Austria-Hungary), a submarine of the Austro-Hungarian Navy

== Other uses ==
- Great ditrigonal icosidodecahedron
- Neumann U 47, a microphone
- Small nucleolar RNA SNORD47
- U 47 – Kapitänleutnant Prien, a German war film
- Uppland Runic Inscription 47
- U47, a line of the Dortmund Stadtbahn
