= U48 =

U48 may refer to:

- German submarine U-48, various vessels
- Great icosicosidodecahedron
- Neumann U 48, a microphone
- Small nucleolar RNA SNORD48
- U-48-class submarine, of the Austro-Hungarian Navy
- Uppland Runic Inscription 48
