= HMS Britomart (J22) =

Minesweeper of the Royal Navy

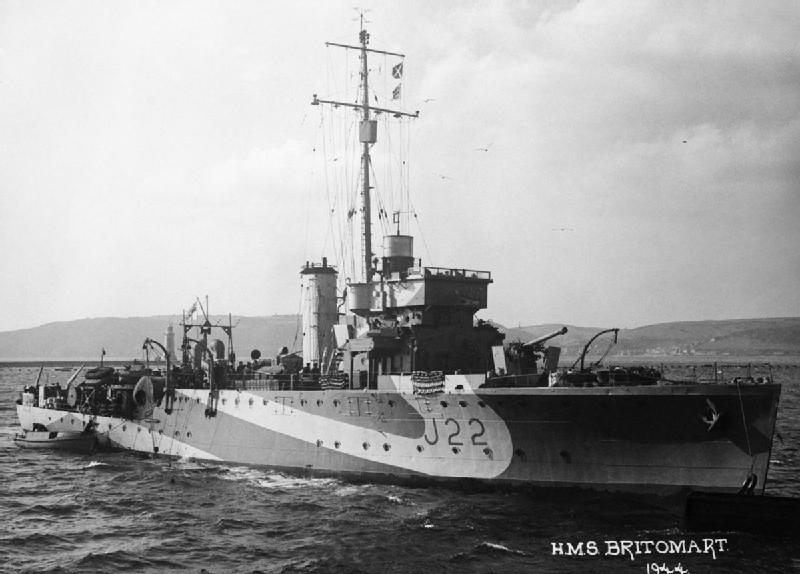

History

United Kingdom
- Name: HMS Britomart
- Ordered: 11 August 1937
- Builder: Devonport Dockyard
- Laid down: 1 January 1938
- Launched: 23 August 1938
- Commissioned: 24 August 1939
- Fate: Sunk by RAF Hawker Typhoons on 27 August 1944

General characteristics
- Class & type: Halcyon-class minesweeper
- Displacement: 815–835 long tons (828–848 t); 1,310–1,372 long tons (1,331–1,394 t), full load
- Length: 245.25 ft (74.75 m)
- Beam: 33.5 ft (10.2 m)
- Draught: 6.75 ft (2.06 m)
- Propulsion: 2 x Admiralty 3-drum water-tube boilers, Parsons steam turbines, 1,750 shp (1,305 kW) on 2 shafts
- Speed: 16.5 knots (31 km/h)
- Range: 7,200 nmi (13,330 km) at 10 knots (19 km/h)
- Complement: 80
- Armament: 2 × QF 4 in Mk.V (L/45 102 mm) guns, single mounts HA Mk.III; 4 × QF 0.5 in Mk.III (12.7 mm) Vickers machine guns, quad mount HA Mk.I; 8 × 0.303 in (7.7 mm) Lewis machine guns
- Notes: Badge: On a field barry wavy of six white and blue a decresant Gold overall a net Black

HMS Britomart was a Halcyon-class minesweeper of the Royal Navy. She served during the Second World War and was sunk in 1944 in a friendly fire incident. The actor Robert Newton served aboard her until 1942.

== Construction and commissioning ==
Britomart was ordered on 11 August 1937 and was laid down at Devonport Dockyard on 1 January 1938. She was launched on 23 August that year, and commissioned on 24 August 1939. She was adopted by the civil community of Clowne, Derbyshire in 1942 following a successful Warship Week National Savings campaign.

== Career ==
=== In the North Sea ===
After completing contractors' trials in August 1939 she took up her war station in the North Sea as part of the 1st Minesweeping Flotilla. In September she joined the flotilla, consisting of HMS Bramble, Hazard, Hebe, Sharpshooter, Speedy and Seagull at Scapa Flow. They were subsequently deployed on minesweeping operations to ensure a clear passage for Home Fleet ships passing in and out of the Fleet anchorage. The flotilla carried out these duties until November, when they were transferred to the Clyde following the sinking of the battleship HMS Royal Oak. They were deployed at Greenock. They resumed service in the North Sea in December 1939, ensuring the passages through the East Coast Mine Barrier were kept clear of mines.

January 1940 saw the flotilla transferred for Atlantic convoy defence duties, based out of Stornoway and covering the passage of convoys to Canada. Britomart and Bramble sailed for a refit in Leith in March which lasted until May. They rejoined the fleet at Scapa Flow in June and commenced their sweeping duties. This kept them occupied until February 1941, when Britomart, Bramble, Hebe and Sharpshooter were transferred to Harwich to sweep convoy routes as part of the Nore Command. Britomart came under air attack on 15 March whilst sweeping off Rye, East Sussex and was hit by a bomb. It struck near the wardroom, killing everyone inside and causing considerable damage. She made for Portsmouth under her own steam and escorted by Sharpshooter. Her repairs lasted from April to May, and on her return to service in June she joined the 3rd Escort Group with HMS Hazard and Bramble. August saw them based at Stornoway and deployed as local escorts for the Atlantic convoys, as well as their usual sweeping duties.

=== With the Arctic convoys ===
Britomart was nominated in August 1941 for detached service in North Russia, carrying out sweeping duties to ensure the safe passage of Russian convoys to and from Iceland. Her sisters HMS Gossamer, Leda and Hussar were nominated at the same time, and ordered to join HMS Halcyon, Harrier and Salamander, which were already at Archangel. After preparing for Arctic service they sailed for Iceland in September and on 29 September they joined convoy PQ 1 with the cruiser HMS Suffolk. The convoy arrived at Archangel on 11 October and the flotilla commenced their Russian deployment. Between October 1941 and January 1942 Britomart was engaged in sweeping operations in the Barents Sea, ensuring the safe movement of traffic in and out of the ports of Archangel and Murmansk. On 7 February she joined Sharpshooter in escorting the inward bound convoys PQ 9 and PQ 10 until their arrival in Murmansk on 10 February. On 13 February they joined the return convoy QP 7 through the Barents Sea, before being detached on 15 February and returning to Murmansk.

=== PQ 17 ===
Britomart served in North Russia until March 1942, when she was nominated to return to the UK. On 21 March she and Sharpshooter joined the return convoy QP 9 at Kola Inlet. They sailed with the convoy as far as Reykjavík, which they reached on 3 April. They then sailed to the UK, where they were taken in hand for a refit. The refit lasted throughout May, during which time a Type 271 radar was fitted. She sailed for Reykjavík again in completion of these works and on 27 June 1942 joined convoy PQ 17 with HMS Salamander and Halcyon. The convoy was ordered to scatter by the Admiralty on 4 July in view of the presumed threat of attack by the German capital ships Tirpitz, Admiral Scheer and Admiral Hipper. Britomart was deployed on 5 July with several of the smaller escorts to search for the scattered merchant ships. She and the escorts gathered up six merchants and made for Novaya Zemlya, whilst under continued air attack. The battered ships arrived at Archangel on 11 July, and Britomart resumed her sweeping duties.

=== Sweeping in the Barents ===
She carried these duties out throughout August 1942 and into September, and on 13 September was part of the local escort for Convoy QP 14, with HMS Halcyon, Hazard and Salamander. On 18 September they joined two Soviet destroyers in escorting the inward bound Convoy PQ 18, which had come under air attack. The convoy arrived on 20 September and Britomart resumed her sweeping duties. She was next deployed on 17 November with HMS Halcyon, Hazard, Salamander and Sharpshooter in escorting Convoy QP 15 through the Barents Sea. They were detached on 20 November and returned to Archangel. Britomart was briefly in the UK at the start of 1943, but was nominated to return to Russia as part of the escort for convoy JW 52, and joined the assembled convoy at Loch Ewe. She deployed on 17 January with the corvettes HMS Lotus and Starwort, and three naval trawlers. The convoy came under air attack on 24 January, but these were ineffective. They arrived on 27 January and Britomart resumed her usual duties.

On 24 July 1943 she helped get a fire under control after an attack by four Messerschmitt Bf 109s started a fire on the SS Llandaff. The attack took place about 20 nautical miles (37 km) NE of Kildin Island. Llandaff was part of a small convoy bringing timber from the White Sea to Kola Inlet.

=== Assigned to the Normandy landings ===
She escorted several more convoys through the Barents in February 1943 and continued her sweeping duties until October. She briefly came under air attack whilst sweeping off Cape Article, and was hit by two bombs. They bounced off the deck without exploding.

She returned to the UK in November 1943, having escorted convoy RA 54A and after arriving on 14 November she underwent a refit. On completion of the refit she was nominated to join the new 1st Minesweeping Flotilla, along with HMS Harrier, Gleaner, Halcyon, Hussar, Jason, Salamander, Seagull and Speedwell. Throughout February and March 1944 they carried out their duties in the North Sea, and were subsequently nominated for minesweeping support during the planned allied landings in Normandy (Operation Neptune).

They sailed for Portsmouth in April 1944 and joined Force S. They were instructed to clear the approach channels to the beach head anchorage areas, and had three Motor Launches and four Isles class danlayers attached to the flotilla for these duties. Britomart took part in preparatory exercises with the ships of Force S, and carried out night sweeping exercises with the Flotilla. After briefings in Portsmouth she deployed in Channel 9 in advance of the assault convoys.

The operation was delayed by 24 hours on 4 June, and they sailed from the Solent on 5 June to commence operations. They carried out their sweeps, and on completion of this by 6 June they began clearing the anchorages. They were deployed on 8 June to begin widening the approach channels and carrying out defence patrols off the Eastern Task Force landing areas. They carried this out throughout July, under constant threat of attack from E-Boats and midget submarines. By August Britomart was deployed off Arromanches with HMS Harrier, Jason, Hussar, Gleaner and Salamander. They were transferred to the Le Havre area for mine sweeping operations in the anchorage selected for the bombardment of enemy positions by HMS Warspite and the monitors HMS Erebus and Roberts. They came under shore fire on 23 August during these operations, but by 26 August they had received permission to remain in the area to complete the clearances instead of returning to Arromanches.

== Sinking ==
Whilst carrying out these clearances on 27 August 1944, the flotilla came under rocket attack by RAF Typhoons. Britomart and Hussar took direct hits and were sunk. Salamander had her stern blown off and sustained heavy damage, while Jason was raked by cannon fire, killing and wounding several of her crew. Two of the trawlers were also hit. The incident was found to be due to the failure of the Flag Officer British Assault Area to ensure that the approval of the extended minesweeping operation had been passed to those concerned with the air operations over the beaches. The ships were assumed to be enemy craft, since the air commanders believed that no allied ships were in the area at the time.
