= HMS Jason (J99) =

Minesweeper of the Royal Navy

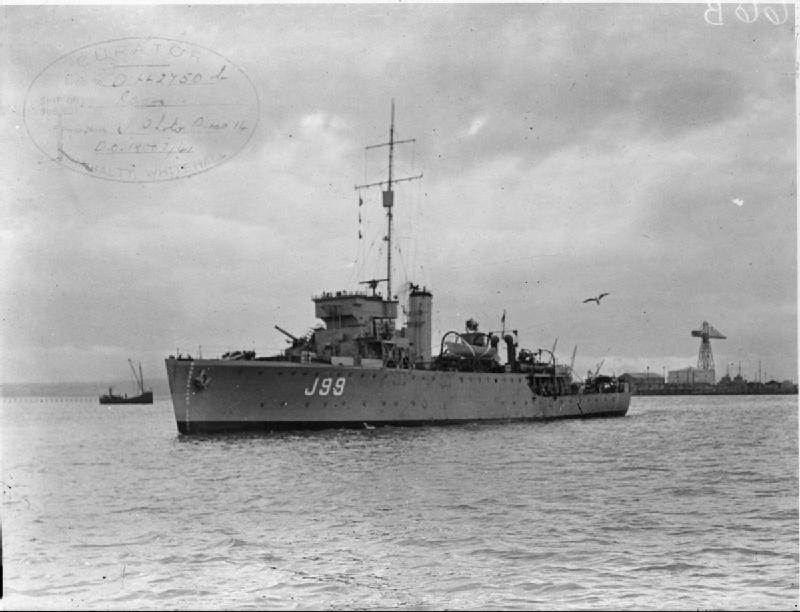
- Jason in 1941

History

United Kingdom
- Name: HMS Jason
- Builder: Ailsa Shipbuilding Co. Ltd., Troon
- Laid down: 12 December 1936
- Launched: 6 October 1937
- Commissioned: 9 June 1938
- Honours and awards: Atlantic (1940); North Sea (1941–42); Arctic (1943); Normandy (1944)
- Fate: Scrapped in 1950
- Badge: On a field Red, a golden fleece.

General characteristics
- Class & type: Halcyon-class minesweeper
- Displacement: 815–835 long tons (828–848 t); 1,310–1,372 long tons (1,331–1,394 t), full load
- Length: 245 ft 9 in (74.90 m)
- Beam: 33 ft 6 in (10.21 m)
- Draught: 9 ft (2.7 m)
- Propulsion: 2 × Admiralty 3-drum water-tube boilers, 2 × geared turbines driving 2 shafts producing 2000 shp
- Speed: 17 knots
- Range: 6,000 nmi (11,110 km) at 10 knots; 4,800 nmi (8,890 km) at 15 knots
- Complement: 80 (peace time)
- Armament: 2 × 4-inch (100 mm) AA; 4 × 0.5-inch (12.7 mm) MG AA; 4 × 0.303" machine guns; 4 × depth charge throwers; 2 × depth charge rails

HMS Jason was a Halcyon-class minesweeper. She was named after the hero in Greek mythology and was the sixteenth Royal Navy ship to carry the name Jason. She was laid down on 12 December 1936, launched on 6 October 1937, and was completed on 9 June 1938. She survived the Second World War and was sold in 1946 to become a cargo ship. She was eventually broken up in 1950. Her pennant number was originally N99, but was changed to J99 in May 1940.

== Design ==
The Halcyon class were a class of dedicated minesweepers, designed to be smaller and cheaper than the dual-purpose (minesweeping and colonial patrol vessel) minesweeping sloops that had been built since the late 1920s (i.e. the Bridgewater class, Hastings class and Shoreham class), which as their design evolved, were becoming increasingly focused on escort duties and becoming too large for use as minesweepers.

Jason was 245 feet 6 inches (74.83 m) long overall and 230 feet 0 inches (70.10 m) between perpendiculars, with a beam of 33 feet 6 inches (10.21 m) and a draught of 10 feet 3 inches (3.12 m) at deep load. Displacement was 835 long tons (848 t) standard and 1,330 long tons (1,350 t) deep load. Two Admiralty 3-drum water-tube boilers supplied steam to geared steam turbines driving two shafts. The machinery was rated at 1,750 shaft horsepower (1,300 kW) giving a speed of 17 knots (20 mph; 31 km/h).

Armament consisted of two QF 4 inch (102 mm) Mk V guns on High-Angle mounts and so capable of being used for anti-aircraft duties, with a close-in armament of one quadruple Vickers .50 machine gun mount. One of the 4-inch guns was removed during the Second World War, while the multiple machine guns were replaced by 4–8 Oerlikon 20 mm cannon. Up to 40 depth charges could be carried when used in the escort role. The ship had a crew of 80 officers and other ranks.

== Service ==
=== Pre-war Duties ===
Before the war, HMS Jason carried out surveys of the English and Bristol Channels. She carried out two principal surveys during 1938 and 1939. She was unarmed until the outbreak of the Second World War.

=== World War II ===
==== Home Waters ====
Although HMS Jason had been designed as a minesweeper, in September 1939, she was converted into an antisubmarine vessel and assigned to 1st Anti-submarine striking force at Belfast. Her first minor damage sustained was on 12 October when she was grounded at Row Point. Repairs were completed by 17 October and she was deployed in home waters for convoy defence, but she put in for more repairs on 3 August 1940, this time because of problems in her boilers.

After the repairs, she was again deployed to convoy defence, this time in the North West Approaches, during which she came under repeated attack from German U-boats U-32 and U-28. Although HMS Jason was not damaged in the attacks, four merchant ships were lost and Jason picked up 18 survivors. After one month in that role, yet more repairs were needed after a collision with the rescue tug Scheldt, in which significant structural damage to her stem was sustained. This time repairs were completed at HM Dockyard, Rosyth, and she was, upon release, deployed to the Rosyth Escort Force to defend shipping to and from Clyde.

As part of the Rosyth Escort Force, she was again subject to U-boat attack in October whilst escorting Convoy HX 79 (totalling 49 ships) off Rockall. This was part of the most vicious U-boat attacks of the war, with ten ships being lost from Convoy HX 79 alone. HMS Jason, however, was undamaged and picked up 78 survivors on 19 October and a further 111 survivors on 20 October. None of the eight attacking submarines were sunk.

After this, Jason was primarily assigned to an anti-air role, and the number of AA guns was increased c.1941. On several occasions in early 1941, she was required to use this extra armament to fend off attacks from German aircraft. No ship was damaged in any of these attacks, sometimes as a direct result of Jason's anti-aircraft fire.

She was once again put in for repair on 21 July 1941 at Leith, after which she escorted more convoys through quieter times. In mid-1942, she yet again put in for repair and re-fit which, together with trials, lasted until early 1943. Part of the re-fit was in preparation for her new assignment, which was to operate in Arctic waters with ships of the Soviet Union.

==== Soviet Waters ====
Her first assignment in this new rôle was to escort Arctic Convoy JW 53 to Murmansk on 15 February. Things did not start well, with several ships unable to even begin the journey. The convoy encountered terrible weather from the start, some of the worst experienced by any of the Russian convoys. HMS Jason was the lead ship and under command of Cdr. H.G.A. Lewis. Lewis did a remarkable job of keeping order in the confusion which saw several ships damaged. HMS Sheffield had the armour plating torn from one of her turrets by the heavy seas on the first day. The visibility was so poor that it was rarely clear how many ships were keeping up with the convoy, and communication was always troublesome.

On the third day, the escort trawler HMS Lord Middleton suffered flooding and was forced to retreat to Scapa Flow, another escort, HMS Dianella, also left the convoy to escort Lord Middleton. Also that day, the trawler Komiles suffered damage and was forced to retreat to the Faeroe Islands. An SOS signal was received from Komiles two days later as she had suffered hull damage in the storm.

The next day brought yet more chaos. Heavy seas made visual communication almost impossible, and Jason was damaged by the weather and forced to carry out repairs to the ventilation trunking. By the afternoon, only 22 ships were left in the convoy, the others having retreated. Over the next few days, more destroyers and corvettes joined the escort but HMS Pytchley and HMS Middleton left for Seydisfjord, Iceland to refuel.

The weather started to clear on 23 February, but German aircraft sighted the convoy and one day later it was attacked by U-255 and U-622. The escorts managed to defend the convoy and no ships were damaged. Air attacks from 21 Ju 88s followed over the next two days, but were again prevented by the escort from causing any damaging to the convoy.

On 26 February, Soviet destroyers joined the escort and it arrived at the Kola Inlet in Murmansk the following day with only 15 ships making it to the Soviet port.

Along with HMS Britomart, HMS Jason was stationed in North Russia for the next few months as a minesweeper and patrol. Throughout this period, they were under constant air attack, but neither suffered any significant damage (two bombs hit HMS Britomart and skidded along the deck, but neither exploded). It was noted that standards of the crew had dropped significantly since operation in Soviet waters, but both ships performed so well that the Russians offered to buy them. On 1 November 1943, she joined Convoy RA 54 as an escort and returned to the United Kingdom.

==== Normandy Landings ====
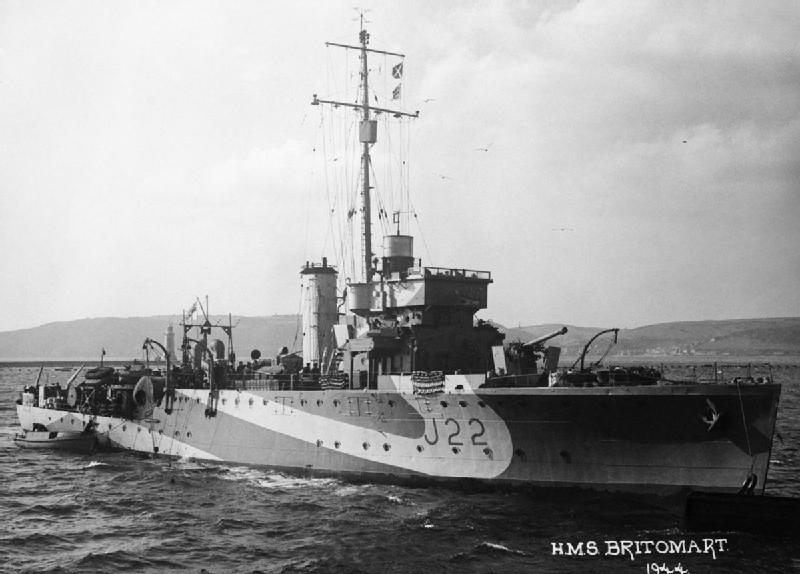
HMS Britomart was the leader of the 1st Minesweeping Flotilla from 7 March 1944

From 22 November 1943 through to early 1944, she was going under another extensive re-fit at HMNB Portsmouth. On completion of the re-fit she was nominated to join the newly formed 1st Minesweeping Flotilla, along with HMS Britomart, Gleaner, Halcyon, Harrier, Hussar, Salamander, Seagull and Speedwell. Throughout February and March they carried out their duties in the North Sea, and were subsequently nominated for a support rôle during the Normandy Landings. Prior to the landings, Jason was assigned to sweep channel 9 in front of the landing parties, no mines were discovered but coastal batteries fired upon her. She continued in support for the next few days, as well as providing an escort for her flagship, HMS Scylla. On 18 June, she was involved in a collision which caused significant damage and flooding and so she was required to retire to Portsmouth for repairs.

==== Post-invasion minesweeping ====
She resumed her service in the 1st Minesweeping Flotilla in August after her re-fit. They were now operating out of Mulberry Harbour at Arromanches, with instructions to keep the channel between there and Portsmouth clear of mines. On 22 August they were sent to clear a magnetic minefield off Cap d'Antifer in preparation for HMS Warspite, Erebus and Roberts to move in and bombard enemy positions at Le Havre. On 26 August, they were ordered back to their area between Arromanches and Portsmouth, but upon a specific request from Commander Crick of Jason, who noted that the Cap d'Antifer area was not yet safe, they were allowed to remain in the area for another day and complete the task.

==== Friendly Fire Incident ====
"Suddenly there were explosions and action stations sounded. My action station was the flag deck below the bridge. When I came on deck, I saw one ship listing badly, the crew abandoning ship. As I approached the ladder to the bridge, I saw two spitfires heading for the ship at sea level. The first one opened fire on the ship. I dived behind a locker."

Thomas Jackson on HMS Jason

Although this was the responsible request of a mindful commander, and although the continuation of operations off Cap d'Antifer were official, it would end in disaster the following day when a flag officer failed to advise all concerned with air operations of the approval to extend minesweeping operations in the area.

Jason was leading the 1st Minesweeping Flotilla in sweeping operations when, at about noon, a Royal Air Force (RAF) reconnaissance aircraft flew over low, the pilot returning the waves from the ships' companies. Yet about ninety minutes later, 16 RAF rocket-firing Typhoons, of 263 and 266 Squadrons, operating from Caen, accompanied by a Polish squadron of Spitfires, swooped out of the sun and attacked Britomart, they then returned for a second attack, hitting Hussar and Salamander. Many of the seamen from the two ships were now in the water being shelled by German shore batteries. As a result of this friendly fire disaster, Britomart and Hussar were sunk and Salamander was a wreck floating on the calm water. Jason was damaged but not destroyed and started to rescue survivors. She also made smoke to hinder German shore batteries and took Salamander on tow. The ship was saved from sinking, but was damaged beyond repair. Soon, other ships in the area assisted in the rescue of stricken seamen. HMS Gozo and ships of the 6th Minesweeping Flotilla were in the area preparing to join Jason and witnessed the attack.

"It is felt that the fury and ferocity of concerted attacks by a number of Typhoon aircraft armed with rockets and cannons is an ordeal that has to be endured to be truly appreciated."

A/Cdr. Trevor Crick of HMS Jason

A hundred and seventeen Royal Navy men were killed and 149 wounded, many seriously. It was the most severe attack endured by any ships during Operation Neptune and the commander of HMS Jason, Acting Commander Trevor Crick, was granted the military OBE for his "coolness, courage and devotion to duty". Four other ship commanders were made MBEs, including Lieutenant John Sulman of HMS Colsay, who was injured in the back during the incident. The RAF was exonerated but Acting Commander D. N. Venables DSC, was severely reprimanded for negligence in not making sure the Flag Officer British Assault Area was informed of the change of order.

Jason was then put in for repair at Portsmouth. It would be a month before she returned to active duty. For the last two months of 1944, she operated from Ostend sweeping off the Belgium coast. In January 1945, the 1st Minesweeping Flotilla was reassigned to Harwich to counter mining efforts by German E-boats and midget submarines. In February, Jason was nominated for re-fit in London.

In April 1945, she rejoined the 1st Minesweeping Flotilla at Harwich and continued minesweeping in the North Sea. It was one task that was not completed as soon as VE-Day dawned and she continued in this capacity until a serious collision in the North Sea with HMS Hazard caused serious structural damage, forcing a return to Portsmouth for repairs. After repairs, she was again sent to continue clearing mines in the North Sea.

=== Cargo Vessel ===
She was sold to Wheelock Marden & Co. on 3 September 1946, renamed Jaslock and converted into a cargo vessel. This career did not last long and she was broken up in 1950.
