= HMS Sturdy (1919) =

Destroyer of the Royal Navy

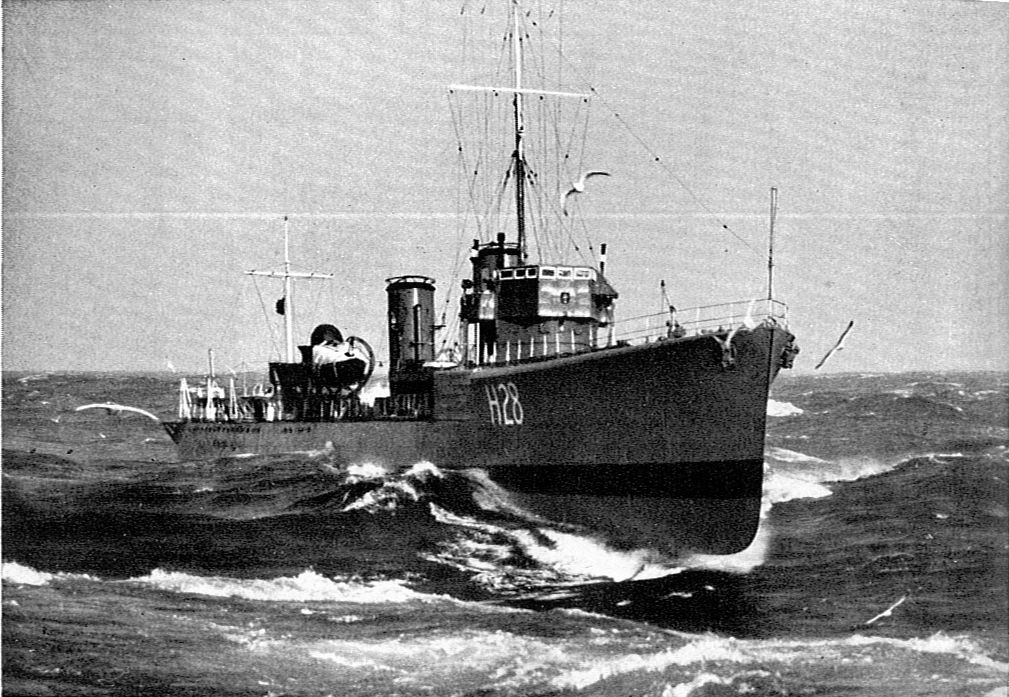
- Sturdy in 1936

History

United Kingdom
- Name: Sturdy
- Ordered: June 1917
- Builder: Scotts, Greenock
- Yard number: 495
- Laid down: April 1918
- Launched: 26 June 1919
- Commissioned: 8 October 1919
- Out of service: 30 October 1940
- Fate: Grounded off the island Tiree

General characteristics
- Class & type: S-class destroyer
- Displacement: 1,000 long tons (1,016 t) normal; 1,220 long tons (1,240 t) deep load
- Length: 265 ft (80.8 m) p.p.
- Beam: 26 ft 8 in (8.1 m)
- Draught: 9 ft 10 in (3.0 m) mean
- Installed power: 3 Yarrow boilers, 27,000 shp (20,000 kW)
- Propulsion: 2 geared Brown-Curtis steam turbines, 2 shafts
- Speed: 36 kn (41 mph; 67 km/h)
- Range: 2,750 nmi (5,093 km) at 15 kn (28 km/h)
- Complement: 90
- Armament: 3 × single QF 4 in (102 mm) guns; 1 × single 2-pdr 40 mm (1.6 in) AA gun; 2 × twin 21 in (533 mm) torpedo tubes; 3 × depth charge chutes

HMS Sturdy was an S-class destroyer (1917), which served with the Royal Navy. Launched in 1919, the destroyer visited the Free City of Danzig the following year but then spent most of the next decade in the Reserve Fleet. After a brief period of service in Ireland in 1931, Sturdy was divested of armament in 1934 and equipped with a single davit to rescue ditched aircraft, and acted as plane guard to the aircraft carrier Courageous. The ship subsequently took part in the 1935 Naval Review. Re-armed as a minelayer, the destroyer was recommissioned the following year and reactivated at the start of the Second World War. Sturdy was then employed escorting convoys in the Atlantic Ocean, but ran aground off the coast off the Inner Hebrides island at Tiree in 1940. The vessel was split in two by the waves. The crew evacuated, apart from three sailors who died, and the destroyer was lost.

== Design and development ==
Sturdy was one of thirty-three Admiralty S class destroyers ordered by the British Admiralty in June 1917 as part of the Twelfth War Construction Programme. The design was a development of the R class introduced as a cheaper and faster alternative to the V and W class. Differences with the R class were minor, such as having the searchlight moved aft.

Sturdy had an overall length of 276 ft (84.1 m) and a length of 265 ft (80.8 m) between perpendiculars. Beam was 26 ft 8 in (8.1 m) and draught 9 ft 10 in (3.0 m). Displacement was 1,000 long tons (1,000 t) normal and 1,220 long tons (1,240 t) deep load. Three Yarrow boilers fed steam to two sets of Brown-Curtis geared steam turbines rated at 27,000 shaft horsepower (20,000 kW) and driving two shafts, giving a design speed of 36 knots (67 km/h; 41 mph). Two funnels were fitted. The vessel carried 301 long tons (306 t) of fuel oil, giving a design range of 2,750 nautical miles (5,093 km; 3,165 mi) at 15 knots (28 km/h; 17 mph).

Armament consisted of three single QF 4 in (102 mm) Mk IV guns on the ship's centreline. One was mounted raised on the forecastle, one on a platform between the funnels and one aft. The ship also mounted a single 2-pounder 40 mm (1.6 in) "pom-pom" anti-aircraft gun for air defence. Four 21 in (533 mm) torpedo tubes were carried in two twin rotating mounts aft. Three depth charge chutes were fitted aft, with typically ten depth charges carried. Eight depth charge throwers were later added. The ship was designed to mount two additional fixed 18 in (457 mm) torpedo tubes either side of the superstructure but this required the forecastle plating to be cut away, making the vessel very wet, so they were removed. The weight saved enabled the heavier Mark V 21-inch torpedo to be carried. The ship had a complement of 90 officers and ratings.

== Construction and career ==
Laid down in April 1918 by Scotts in Greenock with the yard number 495, Sturdy was launched on 26 June 1919. The vessel was the first of the name in Royal Navy service. Commissioned on 8 October 1919, the ship was placed in the Reserve Fleet at Portsmouth under the dreadnought King George V and acted as tender to HMS Columbine, the depot at Port Edgar.

On 31 January 1920, in preparation for a plebiscite in the Free City of Danzig, the British increased their presence in the city. On 1 February, Sturdy and the light cruiser Danae arrived to protect the High Commissioner, Reginald Tower. The role did not last long and Sturdy remained in reserve throughout the following decade. On 13 March 1931, it was announced that Sturdy would be recommissioned for service in the Republic of Ireland. The ship arrived in early April, returning to Devonport for 8 December for repairs to the ship and to give leave for the crew. The destroyer and sister ship Tenedos, based at Cobh and Berehaven, would be replaced at the Irish station by Amazon and Ambuscade, with Sturdy and Tenedos transferring back to the Reserve Fleet.

On 7 May 1934, Sturdy was taken out of reserve and re-equipped as an attendant to the aircraft carrier Courageous. For the role, all armament was removed to lighten the ship, and thus maximise speed, and a davit was installed on a forecastle to enable ditched aircraft to be recovered. The destroyer acted in the guise during joint exercises that took place between 8 and 13 September in the Humber.Sturdy, on 18 May 1935, subsequently hosted the Lord Mayor of London, Stephen Killik. On 16 July, Sturdy took part in a naval review in front of George V and Queen Mary. On 14 January 1936, the destroyer accompanied Courageous on a cruise to the Mediterranean Sea. The cruise involved much of the Home Fleet, led by the battleships Nelson and Rodney. The destroyer accompanied Rodney to Las Palmas and Tenerife between 6 and 14 February. On 16 July, Sturdy returned to Britain and Soon afterwards, was re-commissioned to reserve with armament restored on 5 December.

At the start of the Second World War, the destroyer served under the command of Lieutenant-commander George Cooper, who had been appointed on 31 July 1939. The ship was configured as a minelayer, capable of carrying up to forty mines instead of the aft guns and torpedo tubes. However, the vessel did not use this capacity, instead being deployed to escort convoys in the Battle of the Atlantic. The destroyer was one of the escorts for Convoy HX 79 which, on 19 October, suffered heavily under wolfpack attacks by U-boats. Twelve ships were sunk in a torpedo attack that lasted six hours. On 26 October 1940, Sturdy accompanied sister ship Shikari on an outbound voyage to meet the convoy SC 8 sailing from the United States. Poor weather meant that the ship lost sight of the other destroyer and on 29 October, the captain decided to head instead to Derry. Early the following morning, the destroyer was grounded by the bow at 56 29'N, 06 59'W, off the Inner Hebrides island at Tiree near to the west coast of Scotland. Sturdy could not be released, and instead was evacuated. Three sailors died, but the remainder escaped to shore. The force of the waves broke the ship in half, the stern detaching and swinging round. The wreck was then left to be dispersed by the sea.

== Pennant numbers ==
Pennant number
Pennant number	Date
F96	January 1919
D87	November 1919
F55	December 1920
H28	January 1922
H28	July 1935
