= HMS Sphinx (J69) =

Minesweeper of the Royal Navy

History

United Kingdom
- Name: HMS Sphinx
- Ordered: 26 August 1937
- Builder: Hamilton's, Port Glasgow
- Laid down: 17 January 1938
- Launched: 7 February 1939
- Commissioned: 27 July 1939
- Fate: Bombed and wrecked, 2 February 1940
- Badge: On a field Blue, a Sphinx Gold

General characteristics
- Class & type: Halcyon-class minesweeper
- Displacement: 875 long tons (889 t) standard; 1,350 long tons (1,372 t) full load
- Length: 245 ft 9 in (74.90 m) o/a
- Beam: 33 ft 6 in (10.21 m)
- Draught: 9 ft (2.7 m)
- Propulsion: 2 × Admiralty 3-drum water-tube boilers; Parsons steam turbines; 2,000 shp (1,500 kW) on 2 shafts
- Speed: 16.5 knots (30.6 km/h; 19.0 mph)
- Range: 7,200 nmi (13,300 km; 8,300 mi) at 10 kn (19 km/h; 12 mph)
- Complement: 121
- Armament: As completed: 2 × QF 4 inch Mk.V (L/45 102 mm) guns, single mounts HA Mk.III; 4 × .5 inch Mk.III (12.7 mm) Vickers machine guns, quad mount HA Mk.I; 4 × single .303 inch (7.7 mm) Lewis machine guns; 4 × depth charge throwers; 2 × depth charge rails

HMS Sphinx (J69) was a Halcyon-class minesweeper (officially, "fleet minesweeping sloop") of the British Royal Navy, which was commissioned in 1939, just prior to World War II. During the war she served in the North Sea until bombed and wrecked on 2 February 1940.

== Service history ==
The ship was built by William Hamilton and Company, Port Glasgow, with turbine engines supplied by J. Samuel White of Cowes. She was laid down on 17 January 1938, and launched on 7 February 1939.

Sphinx was commissioned in July 1939, and assigned to the 5th Minesweeping Flotilla, based at Dover as part of the Nore Command. The flotilla carried out minesweeping in the English Channel and the North Sea until December, when it was transferred to Rosyth.

=== Sinking ===
On the morning of 3 February 1940 the Flotilla was minesweeping in the Moray Firth, 15 miles north of Kinnaird Head, in position 57°57′N 02°00′W, when it came under attack by German aircraft. Sphinx was hit by a bomb, which penetrated the foredeck and exploded, killing five men, including the commanding officer Cdr. John Robert Newton Taylor. The crippled ship was taken under tow by Harrier, but eventually capsized 17 hours after being bombed. Boreas rescued 46 of her crew, but 49 men were lost. The wreck later drifted ashore two miles north of Lybster, and was eventually sold for scrap.

On 7 June 1940 the OBE was awarded to Sphinx's Senior surviving Officer and two members of the crew, and there were five Mentions in Despatches, three to crewmen of Sphinx and two from Boreas.
