= HMS Hibiscus (K24) =

Flower-class corvette

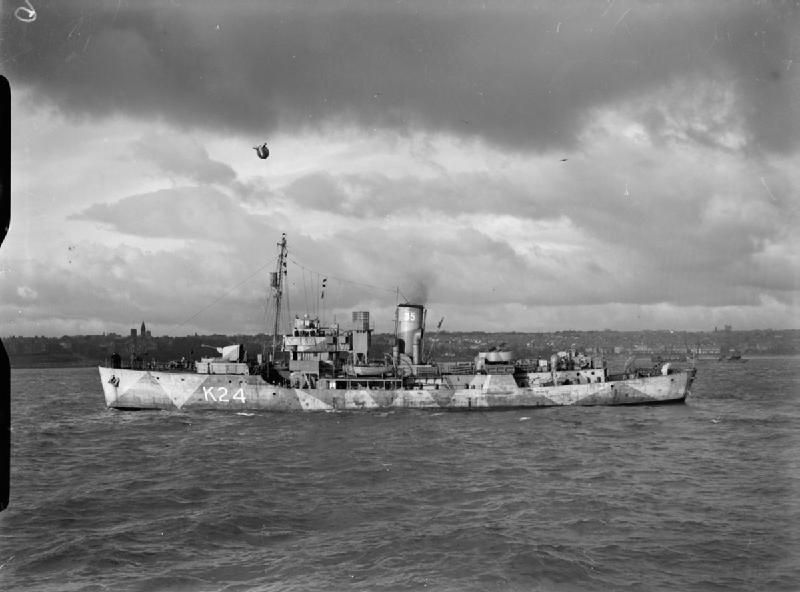
- HMS Hibiscus, in service during the Second World War (image reversed).

History

United Kingdom
- Name: HMS Hibiscus
- Namesake: Hibiscus flower
- Builder: Harland & Wolff, Belfast
- Laid down: 14 November 1939
- Launched: 6 April 1940
- Commissioned: 21 May 1940
- Decommissioned: 2 May 1942
- Identification: Pennant number: K24
- Fate: Transferred to United States Navy

United States
- Name: USS Spry
- Commissioned: 20 May 1942
- Decommissioned: 20 August 1945
- Identification: Hull number: PG-64
- Fate: Returned to Royal Navy

United Kingdom
- Name: HMS Hibiscus
- Fate: Sold into civilian service, 1947, scrapped 1955

General characteristics
- Class & type: Flower-class corvette
- Displacement: 925 long tons (940 t; 1,036 short tons)
- Length: 205 ft (62.48 m)o/a
- Beam: 33 ft 2 in (10.11 m)
- Draught: 13 ft 7 in (4.14 m)
- Propulsion: single shaft; 2 × fire tube Scotch boilers; 1 × 4-cylinder triple-expansion reciprocating steam engine; 2,750 ihp (2,050 kW)
- Speed: 16.5 knots (30.6 km/h)
- Range: 3,500 nautical miles (6,482 km) at 12 knots (22.2 km/h)
- Complement: 85
- Sensors & processing systems: 1 × SW1C or 2C radar; 1 × Type 123A or Type 127DV sonar
- Armament: 1 × 4-inch BL Mk.IX single gun; 2 × .50 cal machine gun (twin); 2 × Lewis .303 cal machine gun (twin); 2 × Mk.II depth charge throwers; 2 × Depth charge rails with 40 depth charges; originally fitted with minesweeping gear, later removed

HMS Hibiscus was a Flower-class corvette, built for the Royal Navy during the Second World War, and was in service in the Battle of the Atlantic. In 1942 she was transferred to the United States Navy as part of the Reverse Lend-Lease arrangement and renamed USS Spry, one of the Temptress-class gunboats. With the end of hostilities she was returned to the Royal Navy and sold into mercantile service.

== Design and construction ==
Hibiscus was built at Harland & Wolff, Belfast, as part of the 1939 War Emergency building programme. She was laid down on 14 November 1939 and launched 6 April 1940. She was completed and entered service on 21 May 1940, being named for the Hibiscus flower. As built, Hibiscus had the short forecastle that was a feature of the early Flowers, and which adversely effected their habitability. She also had the merchant-style enclosed wheelhouse, and the foremast stepped ahead of the bridge, of the original design.

== Service history ==
=== Royal Navy ===
After working up, Hibiscus was assigned to the Western Approaches Escort Force for service as a convoy escort. In this role she was engaged in all the duties performed by escort ships; protecting convoys, searching for and attacking U-boats which attacked ships in convoy, and rescuing survivors. In two years service Hibiscus escorted 29 North Atlantic, 7 Gibraltar and 7 South Atlantic convoys, assisting in the safe passage of over 1300 ships. She was involved in three major convoy battles: In October 1940 Hibiscus was part of the escort for HX 79, which was attacked by a U-boat pack, losing 12 ships sunk. In November 1940 she was with OB 244, which saw 6 ships sunk and one U-boat destroyed. In September 1941 she was with HG 73, which lost nine merchant and one warship sunk.

=== US Navy ===
Following the entry of the United States into the war the US Navy was in need of anti-submarine warfare vessels, and to meet this need a number of ships were transferred from the Royal Navy as part of a reverse Lend-Lease arrangement. Hibiscus was commissioned into the USN on 2 May 1942 as USS Spry. After an overhaul Spry was employed as escort on convoy routes in the Caribbean, and between Trinidad and Recife, Brazil. In 1944 she was reassigned to escort duty and weather reporting in the North Atlantic. In August 1945 Spry was decommissioned and returned to the Royal Navy.

== Fate ==
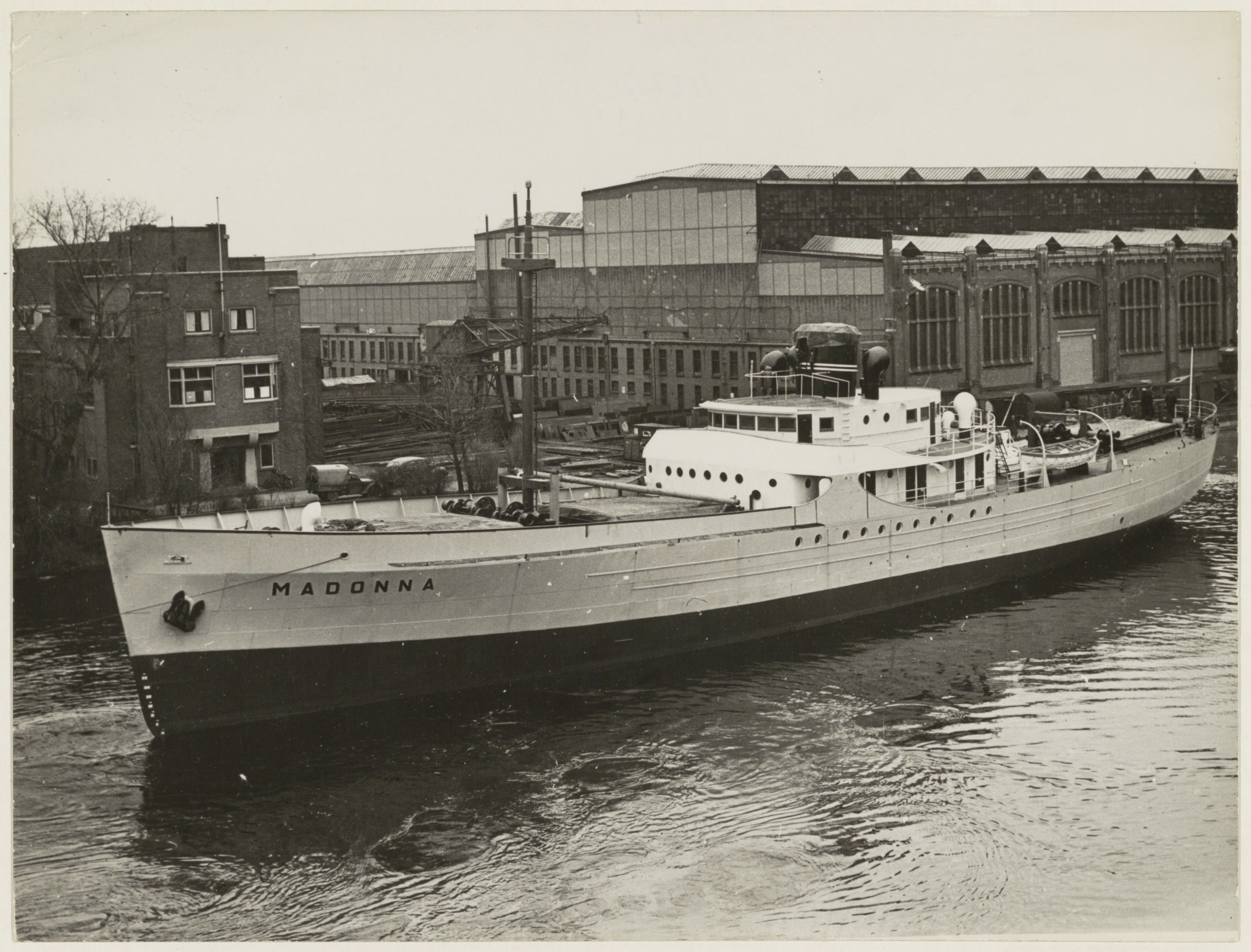
As Madonna, on the river Spaarne at Haarlem in the Netherlands.

Hibiscus was stricken in 1947 and sold into commercial service as the merchant ship Madonna. She was scrapped at Hong Kong in 1955.
