= HMS Hussar (J82) =

Minesweeper of the Royal Navy

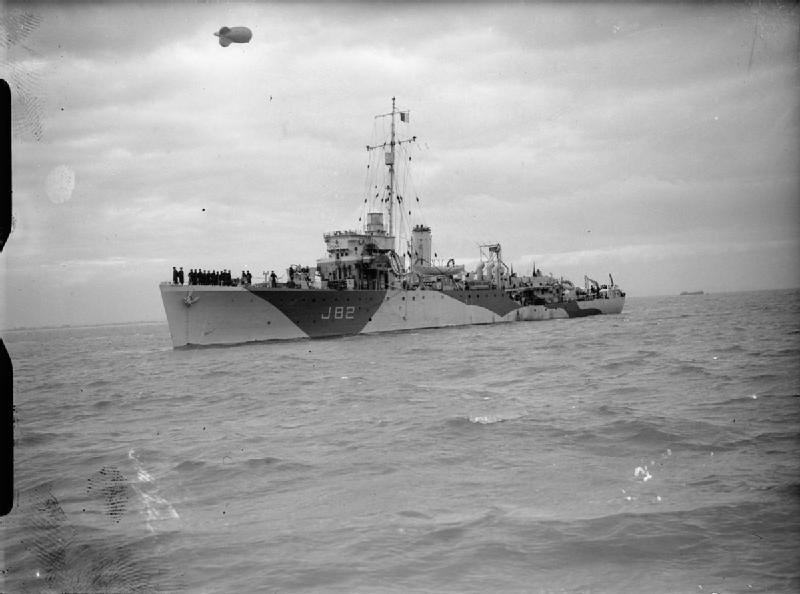
- HMS Hussar (J82) during World War II

History

United Kingdom
- Name: HMS Hussar
- Ordered: 23 February 1933
- Builder: John I. Thornycroft & Company, Woolston, Southampton
- Laid down: 28 August 1933
- Launched: 27 August 1934
- Commissioned: 16 January 1935
- Fate: Sunk by RAF Hawker Typhoons on 27 August 1944
- Badge: On a Field Red, two light cavalry sabres Proper

General characteristics
- Class & type: Halcyon-class minesweeper
- Displacement: 815–835 long tons (828–848 t); 1,310–1,372 long tons (1,331–1,394 t), full load
- Length: 245.25 ft (74.75 m)
- Beam: 33.5 ft (10.2 m)
- Draught: 6.75 ft (2.06 m)
- Propulsion: 2 x Admiralty 3-drum water-tube boilers, Parsons steam turbines, 1,750 shp (1,305 kW) on 2 shafts
- Speed: 16.5 knots (31 km/h)
- Range: 7,200 nmi (13,330 km) at 10 knots (19 km/h)
- Complement: 80
- Armament: 2 × QF 4 in Mk.V (L/45 102 mm) guns, single mounts HA Mk.III; 4 × QF 0.5 in Mk.III (12.7 mm) Vickers machine guns, quad mount HA Mk.I; 8 × 0.303 in (7.7 mm) Lewis machine guns

HMS Hussar was a Royal Navy Halcyon-class minesweeper of World War II.

As the Allied armies advanced following the invasion of Normandy, Hussar, Britomart, Jason and Salamander were assigned to the 1st Minesweeping Flotilla (1MF) clearing Axis minefields north of Normandy to open additional ports to supply the advance. On the afternoon of 27 August 1944, they were sweeping off Cap d'Antifer in preparation for the battleship Warspite and monitors Erebus and Roberts to engage Le Havre coastal artillery delaying the advance of Canadian troops.

The headquarters officer assigning the minesweeping project to 1MF neglected to inform the Flag Officer British Assault Area (Rear‑Admiral Rivett‑Carnac), who was responsible for defending the invasion beaches from E-boats operating out of Le Havre. 1MF was observed on a southwesterly leg of the minesweeping operation and assumed to be German ships proceeding to attack Allied shipping off the invasion beaches. The Admiral's staff requested 263 Squadron and 266 Squadron to attack the presumed enemy ships. The squadrons sent 16 Typhoons armed with 20 mm cannon and High Explosive "60 lb" RP-3 unguided rockets. The Royal Air Force (RAF) pilots identified 1MF as apparently friendly shipping but upon questioning their orders were told the Royal Navy had no ships in the area.

In a well-executed attack out of the sun at 13:30, the Typhoons sank Hussar and Britomart and Salamander was damaged far beyond economical repair and written off. Eighty-six British sailors were killed and 124 more were injured. 1MF identified the Typhoons as friendly and poor visibility into the sun prevented early recognition of the impending "friendly fire". Jason established radio contact to terminate the attack.
