= German submarine U-100 =

U-100 may refer to one of the following German submarines:

- SM U-100, a Type U 57 submarine launched in 1917 and that served in the First World War until surrendered on 27 November 1918; broken up at Swansea in 1922
  - During the First World War, Germany also had these submarines with similar names:
    - SM UB-100, a Type UB III submarine launched in 1918 and surrendered on 22 November 1918; broken up at Dordrecht in 1922
    - SM UC-100, a Type UC III submarine launched in 1918 and surrendered on 22 November 1918; broken up at Cherbourg in July 1921
- German submarine U-100 (1940), a Type VIIB submarine that served in the Second World War until sunk on 17 March 1941
