= Stephen Killik =

British stockbroker and Lord Mayor of London

Sir Stephen Killik GBE KCVO JP KCSG

Lord Mayor of London
- In office 1934–1935

Personal details
- Born: Stephen Henry Molyneux Killik; 1861
- Died: 17 April 1938 (aged 76–77)
- Occupation: Stockbroker

Sir Stephen Henry Molyneux Killik (1861 – 17 April 1938) was a British stockbroker. He was Lord Mayor of London from 1934 to 1935.
