= German submarine U-31 =

German submarines, multiple U-31s

U-31 may refer to one of the following German submarines:

- SM U-31 (Germany), was the lead ship of the Type U 31 class of submarines; launched in 1914 and served in the First World War until sunk on 13 January 1915
  - During the First World War, Germany also had these submarines with similar names:
    - SM UB-31, a Type UB II submarine launched in 1915 and sunk on 2 May 1918
    - SM UC-31, a Type UC II submarine launched in 1916 and surrendered on 26 November 1918
- German submarine U-31 (1936), a Type VIIA submarine that served in the Second World War until sunk on 2 November 1940
- German submarine U-31 (S181), a Type 212 submarine of the Bundesmarine that was launched in 2002 and still in service
