= RMS Alaunia =

RMS Alaunia may refer to:

- RMS Alaunia (1913), a British ocean liner launched in 1913 and sunk in 1916
- RMS Alaunia (1925), a British ocean liner launched in 1925 and scrapped in 1957
- RMS Alaunia (1960), a British cargo liner launched in 1960
