= German submarine U-101 =

U-101 may refer to one of the following German submarines:

- SM U-101, a Type U 57 submarine launched in 1917 and that served in World War I until surrendered on 21 November 1918; broken up at Morecambe in June 1920
  - During the First World War, Germany also had these submarines with similar names:
    - SM UB-101, a Type UB III submarine launched in 1918 and surrendered on 26 November 1918; broken up at Felixstowe in 1919–20
    - SM UC-101, a Type UC III submarine launched in 1918 and surrendered on 24 November 1918; broken up at Dordrecht in 1922
- German submarine U-101 (1940), a Type VIIB submarine that served in the Second World War until stricken on 21 October 1943; scuttled 3 May 1945
