= German submarine U-99 =

U-99 may refer to one of the following German submarines:

- SM U-99, a Type U 57 submarine launched in 1917 and that served in the First World War until sunk on 7 July 1917
  - During the First World War, Germany also had these submarines with similar names:
    - SM UB-99, a Type UB III submarine launched in 1918 and surrendered on 26 November 1918; became French submarine Carissan until 24 July 1935; broken up
    - SM UC-99, a Type UC III submarine launched in 1918 and surrendered on 22 November 1918; served as Japanese submarine O-5, 1920–21; broken up at Yokosuka Navy Yard between March and June 1921; destroyed as target, October 1921
- German submarine U-99 (1940), a Type VIIB submarine that served in the Second World War until sunk on 17 March 1941
