= German submarine U-32 =

U-32 may refer to one of the following German submarines:

- SM U-32 (Germany), was a Type U 31 submarine launched in 1914 and that served in the First World War until sunk on 8 May 1918
  - During the First World War, Germany also had these submarines with similar names:
    - SM UB-32, a Type UB II submarine launched in 1915 and sunk on 22 September 1917
    - SM UC-32, a Type UC II submarine launched in 1916 and sunk on 23 February 1917
- German submarine U-32 (1937), a Type VIIA submarine that served in the Second World War until sunk on 30 October 1940
- German submarine U-32 (S182), a Type 212 submarine of the Bundesmarine that was launched in 2003 and in service
