= German submarine U-37 =

U-37 may refer to one of the following German submarines:

- SM U-37, was a Type U 31 submarine launched in 1914 and that served in the First World War until sunk on 30 April 1915
  - During the First World War, Germany also had these submarines with similar names:
    - SM UB-37, a Type UB II submarine launched in 1915 and sunk on 14 January 1917
    - SM UC-37, a Type UC II submarine launched in 1916 and surrendered in 1919
- German submarine U-37 (1938), a Type IX submarine that served in the Second World War until scuttled on 8 May 1945
