= German submarine U-137 =

U-137 may refer to one of the following German submarines:

- SM U-137, a Type U 127 submarine launched in 1916 and that served in the First World War

During the First World War, Germany also had this submarine with a similar name:

- SM UB-137, a Type UB III submarine laid down but unfinished at the end of the war; broken up on the slip in 1919

- German submarine U-137 (1940), a Type IID submarine that served in the Second World War until scuttled on 2 May 1945

U137 may also refer to:

- U137, the designation of the Soviet Whiskey-class submarine S-363 that ran aground on 27 October 1981 just outside Karlskrona, Sweden
