= German submarine U-38 =

U-38 may refer to one of the following German submarines:

- SM U-38, was a Type U 31 submarine launched in 1914 and that served in the First World War until surrendered on 23 February 1919
  - During the First World War, Germany also had these submarines with similar names:
    - SM UB-38, a Type UB II submarine launched in 1916 and sunk on 8 February 1918; in 2008 UB-38's wreck was moved to reduce the danger to shipping
    - SM UC-38, a Type UC II submarine launched in 1916 and sunk 14 December 1917
- German submarine U-38 (1938), a Type IX submarine that served in the Second World War until scuttled on 5 May 1945
