= Halcyon-class minesweeper =

1933 class of British minesweepers

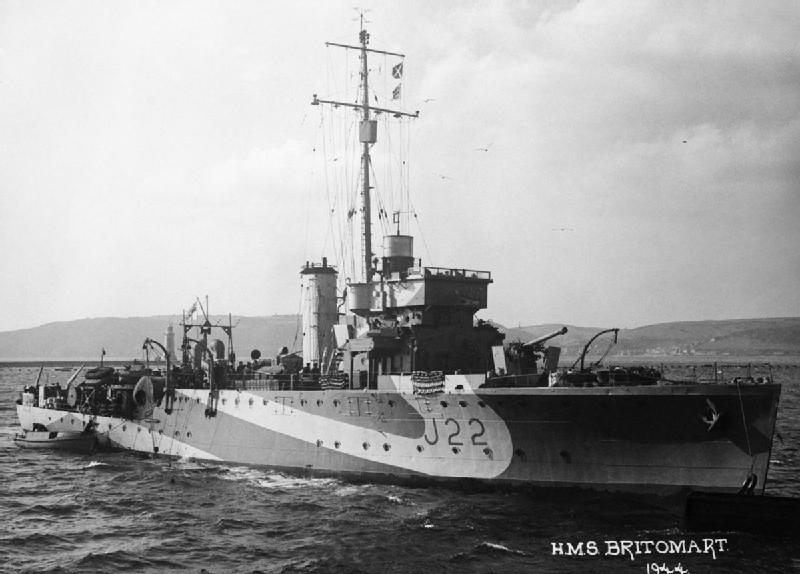
- HMS Britomart secured to a buoy in Plymouth Sound

Class overview
- Operators: Royal Navy
- Preceded by: Racecourse-class minesweeper
- Succeeded by: Bangor-class minesweeper
- Subclasses: reciprocating / turbine-engined
- Planned: 22
- Completed: 21
- Lost: 9 (+1 constructive total loss)
- Retired: 12

General characteristics (reciprocating)
- Type: fleet minesweeper
- Displacement: 815 tons (828 tonnes) standard; 1,370 tons (1,391 tonnes) full load
- Length: 245 ft 9 in (74.90 m) o/a^{ii}
- Beam: 33 ft 6 in (10.21 m)
- Draught: 9 ft (2.7 m)
- Propulsion: 2 × Admiralty 3-drum water-tube boilers, vertical compound reciprocating steam engines on 2 shafts, 1,770 ihp
- Speed: 16.5 to 17 kn (31 km/h)
- Range: 7,200 nmi (13,330 km) at 10 knots (19 km/h)
- Complement: 80
- Armament: 2 × QF 4 inch Mk.V (L/45 102 mm) guns; 1 × mounting CP Mk.II; 1 × mounting HA Mk.III; 8 × .303 inch (7.7 mm) Lewis machine guns

General characteristics (Niger, Salamander)
- Displacement: 1,330 long tons (1,350 t)
- Length: 245 ft 3 in (74.75 m)
- Propulsion: Vertical triple-expansion, 2,000 ihp
- Speed: 17 knots (31 km/h)
- Armament: 2 × QF 4 inch Mk.V (L/45 102 mm) guns, single mounts HA Mk.III; 4 × .5 inch Mk.III (12.7 mm) Vickers machine guns, quad mount HA Mk.I; 8 × .303 inch (7.7 mm) Lewis machine guns
- Notes: Other characteristics as per reciprocating ships

General characteristics (turbine)
- Displacement: 815–835 long tons (828–848 t) /; 1,290–1,350 long tons (1,310–1,370 t) full load
- Propulsion: 2 × Admiralty 3-drum water-tube boilers, Parsons steam turbines, 1,750 shp (1,305 kW) on 2 shafts
- Speed: 16.5 knots (31 km/h)
- Notes: Other characteristics as per Niger/Salamander

The Halcyon class was a class of 21 oil-fuelled minesweepers (officially, "fleet minesweeping sloops") built for the British Royal Navy between 1933 and 1939. They were given traditional small ship names used historically by the Royal Navy and served during the Second World War.

== Design ==
There were 21 ships in the Halcyon class, built in two groups; the first using reciprocating steam engines, with steam turbines in the latter. They were generally smaller versions of the Grimsby-class escort sloops. Niger and Salamander of the reciprocating group used vertical triple expansion engines, instead of the vertical compound engines of their sisters. As a result of the increased power they had a half knot speed advantage, even though they used slightly shorter hulls. The turbine ships used the same shorter hulls as Niger and Salamander, but with lower power, speed dropped back to 16.5 kn (31 km/h; 19 mph). Gleaner, Franklin, Jason and Scott were completed as unarmed survey vessels, Sharpshooter and Seagull being converted to follow suit. They were re-armed and deployed in their original role on the outbreak of war. Seagull had the first all-welded hull built for the Royal Navy.

== Service history ==
Halcyons served in Home waters, at Dunkirk, on Arctic convoys and in the Mediterranean Sea. On 3 February 1940, Sphinx (Cdr. J. R. N. Taylor, RN) was sweeping an area 15 nmi (28 km; 17 mi) north of Kinnaird Head when it was attacked by German aircraft. A bomb pierced the forecastle deck and exploded, destroying the fore part of the ship and killing the commanding officer and forty of his men. Sphinx remained afloat and was towed by HMS Halcyon but having taken in too much water, capsized and sank. The wreck washed ashore north of Lybster and was sold for scrap.

Skipjack (Lt.Cdr. F. B. Proudfoot, RN) was attacked and sunk by a force of German dive bombers off De Panne, Belgium on 1 June 1940. On board Skipjack were between 250 and 300 soldiers rescued from the Dunkirk beaches during Operation Dynamo. A witness, William Stone, said of Skipjack, "She just disappeared".

Halcyons were pressed into service as anti-submarine escorts, performing this task with decreasing frequency as ships specialist anti-submarine vessels, such as Flower-class corvettes, came off the slips. Halcyons accompanied most of the Arctic convoys, serving as minesweepers and anti-submarine escorts. Several spent a long time based at Soviet naval bases in Northern Russia, such as Murmansk. Four Halcyons were lost during this period,

- Gossamer (Lt.Cdr. T. C. Crease), having escorted the first Arctic convoy, attacked a German U-boat while escorting Convoy PQ 11, and helped rescue the crew of the cruiser Edinburgh. On 26 June 1942, in Kola Inlet, Gossamer was dive-bombed and sunk.
- On 5 July 1942, off the coast of Iceland, part of Convoy QP 13 wandered into a British minefield. Niger (Cdr. A. J. Cubison, DSC and Bar), which was escorting the convoy, was lost.
- On 29 September 1942, in the Greenland Sea, Leda was torpedoed and sunk while escorting Convoy QP 14.
- On 31 December 1942, during the Battle of the Barents Sea, Bramble was attacked by the German heavy cruiser Admiral Hipper while escorting Convoy JW 51B. After sustaining serious damage, Bramble was destroyed by the German destroyer Z16 Friedrich Eckoldt.

Hebe and Speedy served in the Mediterranean as part of the 14th/17th Minesweeper Flotilla based in Malta. The minesweepers saw action during the Malta Convoys, Operation Torch and Operation Corkscrew. Hebe was lost to a mine off Bari, Italy on 22 November 1943.

=== Friendly fire losses ===
As the Allied armies advanced following the invasion of Normandy, Britomart, Hussar, Jason and Salamander were assigned to the 1st Minesweeping Flotilla (1MF) clearing Axis minefields, north of Normandy, to open ports to supply the advance. On the afternoon of 27 August 1944, they were sweeping off Cap d'Antifer in preparation for the battleship Warspite and the monitors Erebus and Roberts to engage Le Havre coastal artillery delaying the advance of Canadian troops.

The headquarters officer assigning the minesweeping project to 1MF neglected to inform the Flag Officer British Assault Area (Rear‑Admiral James Rivett‑Carnac), who was responsible for defending the invasion beaches from E-boats operating from Le Havre. 1MF was observed on a south-westerly leg of the minesweeping operation and assumed to be German ships proceeding to attack Allied shipping off the invasion beaches. The Admiral's staff requested 263 Squadron and 266 Squadron to attack the ships. The squadrons attacked with 16 Typhoons armed with 20 mm cannon and High Explosive "60 lb" RP-3 unguided rockets. The pilots identified 1MF as probably friendly shipping but upon questioning their orders were told the Royal Navy had no ships in the area.

In a well-executed attack out of the sun at 13:30, the Typhoons sank Britomart (Lt. Cdr. Nash, MBE, RNR) and Hussar (Lt.Cdr. A. J. Galvin, DSC, RNR) and Salamander was damaged so far beyond economical repair she was written off. Eighty-six British sailors were killed and 124 more were injured. 1MF identified the Typhoons as friendly and poor visibility into the sun prevented early recognition of the impending "friendly fire". Jason established radio contact to terminate the attack.

== Ships in class ==
=== Reciprocating group ===
- Ordered 1932
  - HMS Halcyon, built by John Brown & Company, Clydebank, sold for scrapping 1950
  - HMS Skipjack, built by John Brown, bombed and sunk off Dunkirk on 1 June 1940
- Ordered 1933
  - HMS Harrier, built by John I. Thornycroft & Company, Woolston, sold for scrapping 1950
  - HMS Hussar, built by Thornycroft, sunk in error by RAF aircraft off Cap d'Antifer on 27 August 1944
- Ordered 1934
  - HMS Speedwell, built by William Hamilton and Company, Port Glasgow, sold out of service 1946, wrecked and scrapped 1954
- Ordered 1935
  - HMS Niger, built by J. Samuel White & Company, Cowes, mined off Iceland on 4 June 1942
  - HMS Salamander, built by White, damaged in RAF rocket attack off Cap d'Antifer on 27 August 1944 and written off as constructive total loss, sold for scrapping 1946

=== Turbine group ===
- Ordered 1936
  - HMS Franklin, built by Ailsa Shipbuilding Company, Troon, sold for scrapping 1956
  - HMS Gleaner, built by William Gray & Company, Hartlepool, sold for scrapping 1950
  - HMS Gossamer, built by William Hamilton and Company, bombed and sunk in Kola Inlet on 24 June 1942
  - HMS Hazard, built by William Gray, sold for scrapping 1949
  - HMS Hebe, built by HM Dockyard, Devonport, mined and sunk off Bari, 22 November 1943
  - HMS Jason, built by Ailsa, sold out of service 1946, sold for scrapping 1950
  - HMS Leda, built by HM Dockyard Devonport, torpedoed and sunk by U-435 in Greenland Sea on 20 September 1942
  - HMS Seagull, built by HM Dockyard Devonport, sold for scrapping 1956
  - HMS Sharpshooter, built by HM Dockyard Devonport, renamed Shackleton 1953 and converted to survey vessel, sold for scrapping 1965.
- Ordered 1937
  - HMS Bramble, built by HM Dockyard Devonport, sunk by gunfire from German warships in Barents Sea, 31 December 1942
  - HMS Britomart, built by HM Dockyard Devonport, sunk in error by RAF aircraft off Cap d'Antifer, 27 August 1944
  - HMS Scott, built by Caledon Shipbuilding & Engineering Company, Dundee, sold for scrapping 1965
  - HMS Speedy, built by William Hamilton and Company, sold out of service 1946, sold for scrapping 1957
  - HMS Sphinx, built by William Hamilton and Company, bombed by German aircraft off Kinnaird Head on 3 February 1940, later sank under tow and wreck washed ashore off Lybster, salvaged and scrapped 1950
