= HMS Gleaner (J83) =

Minesweeper of the Royal Navy

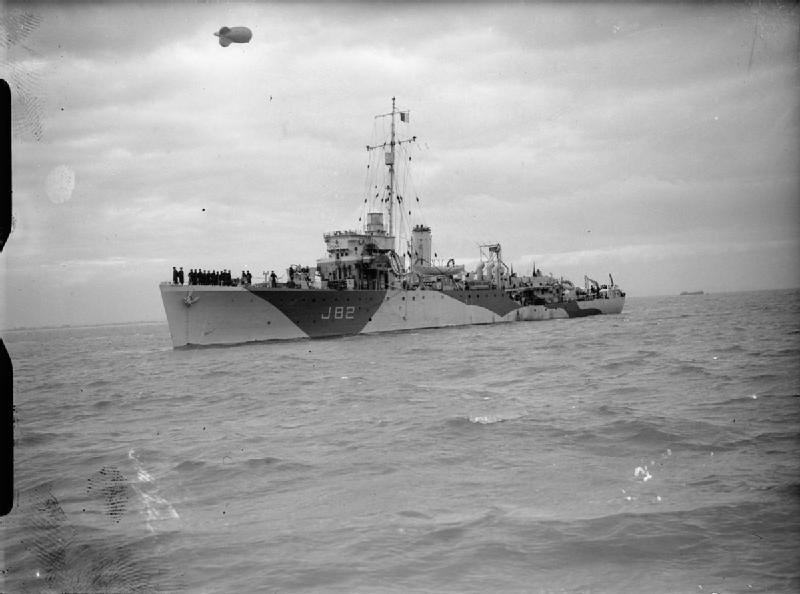
- Sister ship HMS Hussar (J82) during World War II

History

United Kingdom
- Name: HMS Gleaner
- Ordered: 13 March 1936
- Builder: William Gray & Company, Hartlepool
- Launched: 10 June 1937
- Fate: Sold for scrap in 1950

General characteristics
- Class & type: Halcyon-class minesweeper
- Displacement: 830 long tons (843 t) standard; 1,350 long tons (1,372 t) full
- Length: 245 ft 3 in (74.75 m) o/a
- Beam: 33 ft 6 in (10.21 m)
- Draught: 8 ft 9 in (2.67 m)
- Installed power: 1,750 ihp (1,300 kW); 2 × Admiralty 3-drum boilers
- Propulsion: 2 shafts; 2 steam turbines
- Speed: 16.5 knots (30.6 km/h; 19.0 mph)
- Range: 6,000 nmi (11,000 km; 6,900 mi) at 10 knots (19 km/h; 12 mph)
- Complement: 157
- Armament: 2 × single QF 4-inch (100 mm) guns; 1 × quadruple Vickers .50 machine gun mount

HMS Gleaner was one of 21 Halcyon-class minesweepers built for the Royal Navy in the 1930s.

== Design and description ==
The Halcyon class designed as a replacement for the preceding Hunt class and varied in size and propulsion. Gleaner displaced 830 long tons (840 t) at standard load and 1,350 long tons (1,370 t) at deep load. The ship had an overall length of 245 feet 3 inches (74.8 m), a beam of 33 feet 6 inches (10.2 m) and a draught of 8 feet 9 inches (2.7 m).

She was powered by two Parsons geared steam turbines, each driving one shaft, using steam provided by two Admiralty three-drum boilers. The engines produced a total of 1,750 shaft horsepower (1,300 kW) and gave a maximum speed of 16.5 knots (30.6 km/h; 19.0 mph). Gleaner carried a maximum of 252 long tons (256 t) of fuel oil that gave her a range of 6,000 nautical miles (11,000 km; 6,900 mi) at 10 knots (19 km/h; 12 mph). The ship's complement consisted of 80 officers and ratings.

Gleaner was armed with two QF 4-inch (10.2 cm) anti-aircraft guns. She was also equipped with eight .303-inch (7.7 mm) machine guns. Later in her career, the rear 4-inch gun mount was removed as were most of the .303 machine guns, one quadruple mount for Vickers .50 machine guns was added as were up to four single or twin mounts for 20 mm Oerlikon AA guns. For escort work, her minesweeping gear could be exchanged for around 40 depth charges.

== Construction and career ==
Completed by William Gray & Company, Hartlepool as a survey vessel, Gleaner was converted into a minesweeper when the war began.

On 12 February 1940, Gleaner sank German U-boat U-33 (55°25′N 05°07′W) using depth charges and deck gun in the Firth of Clyde. The captain was Lt.Cdr. H. P. Price, RN. The British seized some materials from the U-boat, including Enigma machine rotors VI and VII, whose wirings were unknown at the time. The seizure was one of the "pinches" that aided the cryptanalysis of the Enigma.

Other actions included the rescue of 20 survivors of the torpedoed British merchant ship Astra II on 29 August 1940 56°09′N 12°14′W) and 68 from the torpedoed Empire Tourist on 4 March 1944 (73°25′N 22°11′E).

She was sold for scrap in 1950.

== Bibliography ==
- Chesneau, Roger, ed. (1980). Conway's All the World's Fighting Ships 1922–1946. Greenwich, UK: Conway Maritime Press. ISBN 0-85177-146-7.
- Colledge, J. J.; Warlow, Ben (2006) [1969]. Ships of the Royal Navy: The Complete Record of All Fighting Ships of the Royal Navy from the 15th Century to the Present (3rd Rev ed.). London: Chatham Publishing. ISBN 978-1-86176-281-8. OCLC 67375475.
- Kahn, David (1991). Seizing the Enigma: The Race to Break the German U-Boat Codes, 1939–1943. Boston: Houghton Mifflin. ISBN 0-395-42739-8.
- Lenton, H. T. (1998). British & Empire Warships of the Second World War. Annapolis, Maryland: Naval Institute Press. ISBN 1-55750-048-7.
