= German submarine U-47 =

U-47 may refer to one of the following German submarines:

- SM U-47 (Germany), a Type U 43 submarine launched in 1915 and that served in the First World War until scuttled on 28 October 1918
  - During the First World War, Germany also had these submarines with similar names:
    - SM UB-47, a Type UB II submarine launched in 1916; transferred to Austria-Hungary on 20 July 1917 and renamed U-47; surrendered in 1920
    - SM UC-47, a Type UC II submarine launched in 1916 and sunk on 18 November 1917
- German submarine U-47 (1938), a Type VIIB submarine that served in the Second World War until she went missing after 7 March 1941

U-47 or U-XLVII may also refer to:

- SM U-47 (Austria-Hungary), a U-43 class submarine of the Austro-Hungarian Navy
