= Lovö Runestones =

Coordinates: 59°19′16″N 17°50′22″E

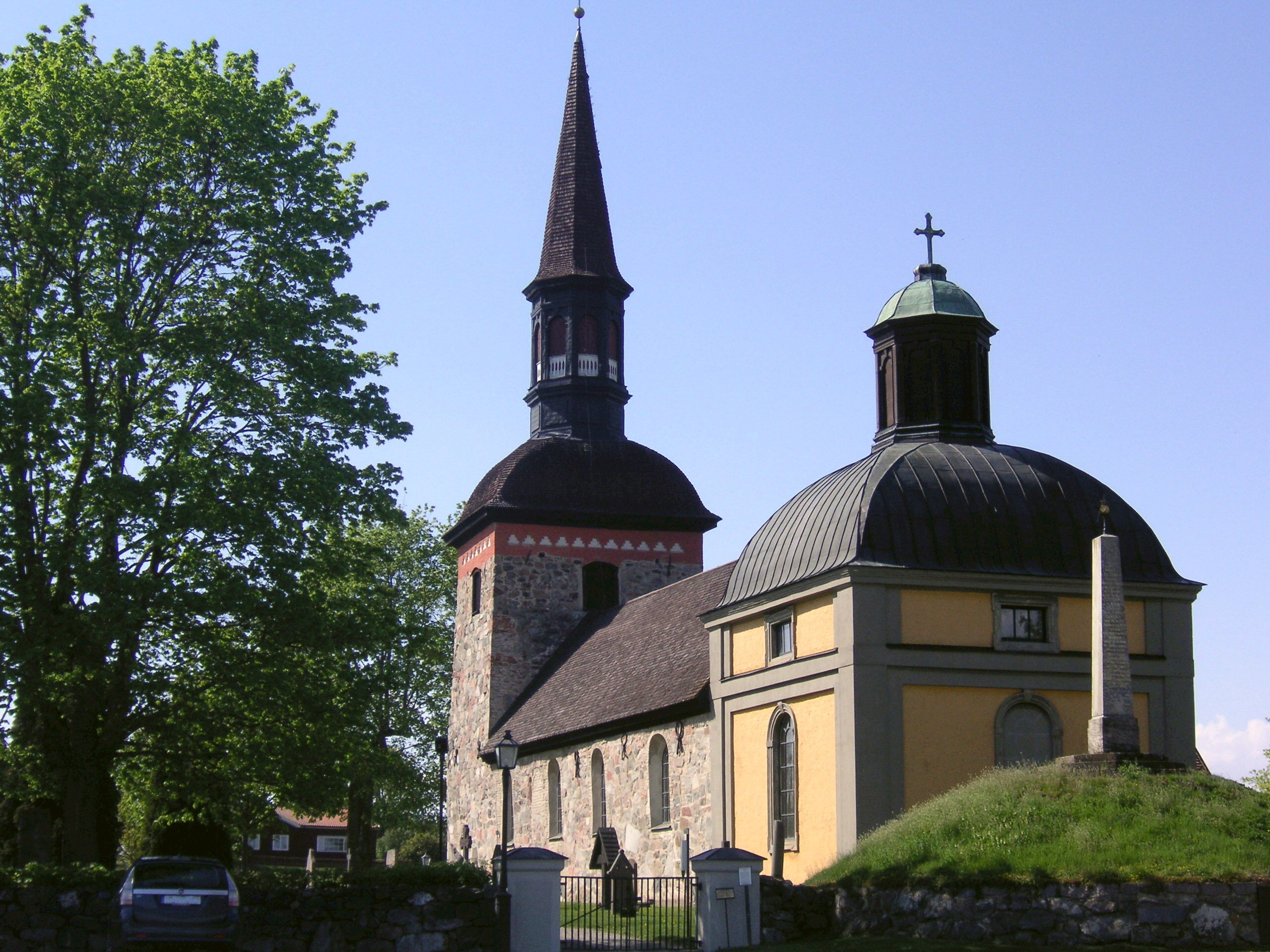
Lovö church in May 2008. It is in Uppland, Sweden, and has five runestones in the surrounding churchyard.

The Lovö Runestones are five Viking Age memorial runestones outside the Lovö church on the island of Lovön in Lake Mälaren, which is in Stockholm County, Sweden, and in the historic province of Uppland.

== U 46 ==
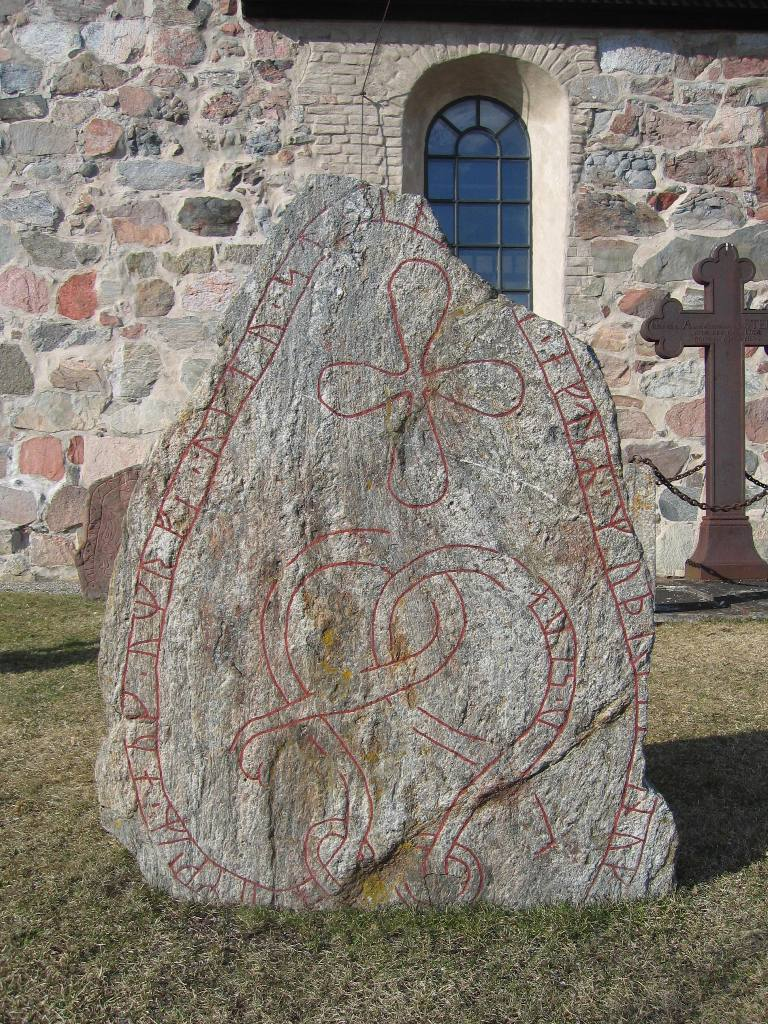
Runestone U 46 outside the Lovö church

Runic inscription U 46 is the Rundata catalog listing for this runestone which is approximately two metres in height and is made of gneiss. It contains a runic text within a serpent surrounding a stylized Christian cross in the upper centre of the stone.

The runestone was located outside of the church's weapons house in the 17th century, and was covered with earth when the weapons house was demolished in 1798. The runestone was uncovered in 1935 during restoration work at the church and it was then placed in its present position.

=== Runic text ===
hulmk[a]iʀ * auk * u... ...[ist]u * st[a]in ... aftiʀ * muþu- ...-nuk-... ...[i]l... ...u * siua

=== Old Norse transcription ===
Holmgeirr ok ... [r]eistu stein ... eptir móðu[r] ... ... ... ...

=== English translation ===
Holmgeirr and ... raised the stone ... in memory of (their) mother ... ... ... ...

== U 47 ==
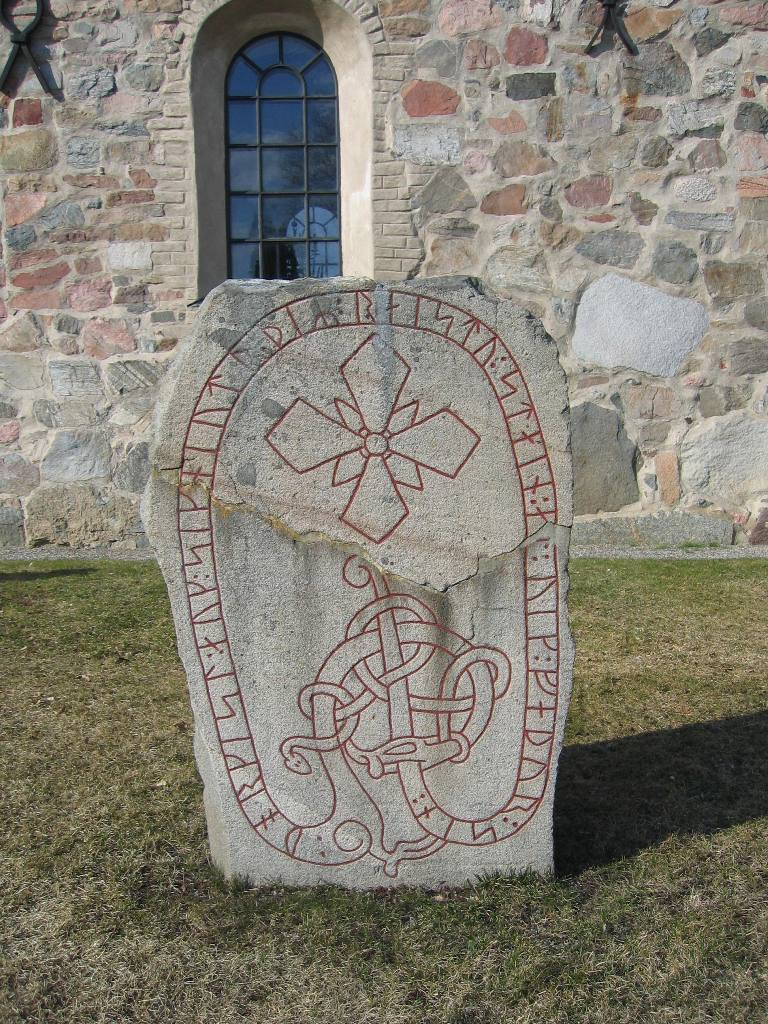
Runestone U 47

Runic inscription U 47 contains runic text within a serpent surrounding a cross in the upper central area. The stone is about 1.75 metres in height. The inscription is attributed to a runemaster with the normalized name of Ärnfast and is classified as being carved in runestone style Pr3, which is also known as Urnes style. This runestone style is characterized by slim and stylized animals that are interwoven into tight patterns. The animal heads are typically seen in profile with slender almond-shaped eyes and upwardly curled appendages on the noses and the necks. The signature of Ärnfast is carved on four surviving inscriptions, U 41 in Kumla, U 43 in Törnby, U 79 in Skesta, and the now-lost U 123 in Karlberg, and about eight other inscriptions including U 47 have been attributed to him based upon stylistic analysis.

This runestone was discovered in the south wall of the Lovö church. Before the historical significance of runestones was understood, they were often used as materials in the construction of buildings, bridges, and roads. It was removed from the wall in the 19th century on orders from King Karl XV and moved to a park at Drottningholm Palace. The runestone was returned to the church in 1952.

=== Runic text ===
: þorkisl : auk : sikniutr : þiʀ : raistu : stain : at : uik : faþur : sin :

=== Old Norse transcription ===
Þorgísl ok Signjótr þeir reistu stein at Víg, fôður sinn.

=== English translation ===
Þorgísl and Signjótr, they raised the stone in memory of Vígr, their father.

== U 48 ==
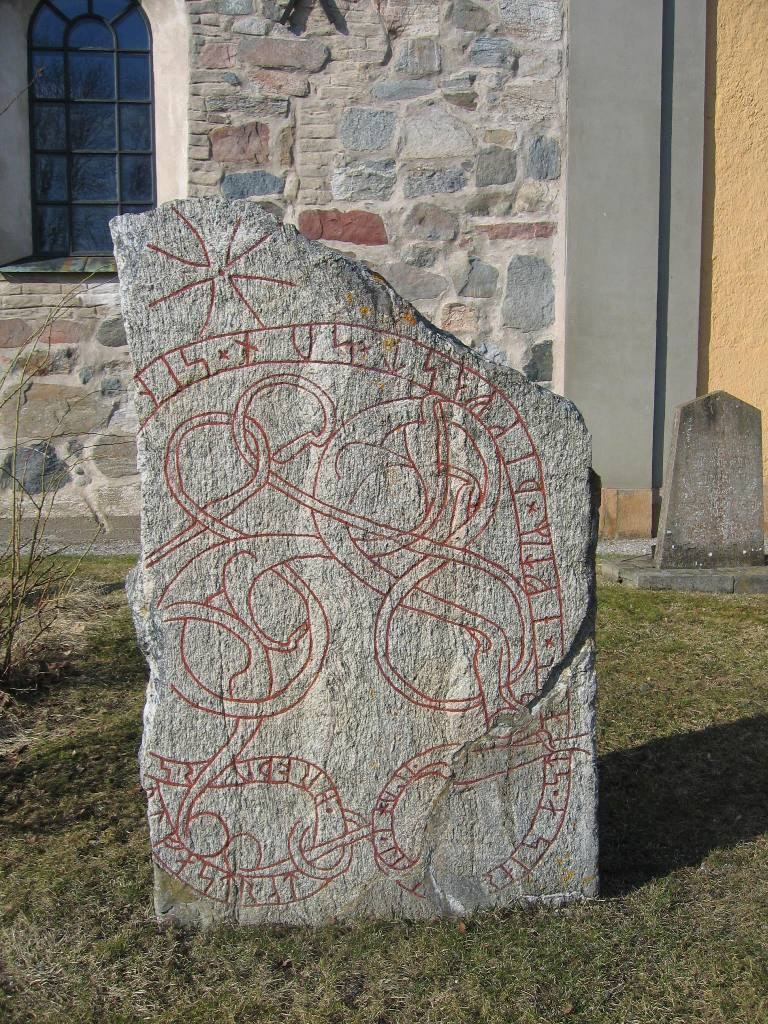
Runestone U 48

Runic inscription U 48 contains runic text within a serpent that is beneath a cross. It is classified as being carved in runestone style Pr4, which is also known as Urnes style. The stone is 1.75 meters in height and is grey gneiss. A portion of one side of the runestone has broken off and this part of the inscription is missing.

The runestone was uncovered in 1932 during trenchwork and moved approximately 60 meters away from a road to its present location in 1951.

=== Runic text ===
* iluhi * li(t) (r)aisa * stain × eftiʀ × þikfast × sun × sin ... ...(u)lfastr ' at * broþur ' s...

=== Old Norse transcription ===
Illugi lét reisa stein eptir Þingfast, son sinn ... ...fastr at bróður s[inn].

=== English translation ===
Illugi had the stone raised in memory of Þingfastr, his son ... ...-fastr in memory of his brother.

== U 49 ==
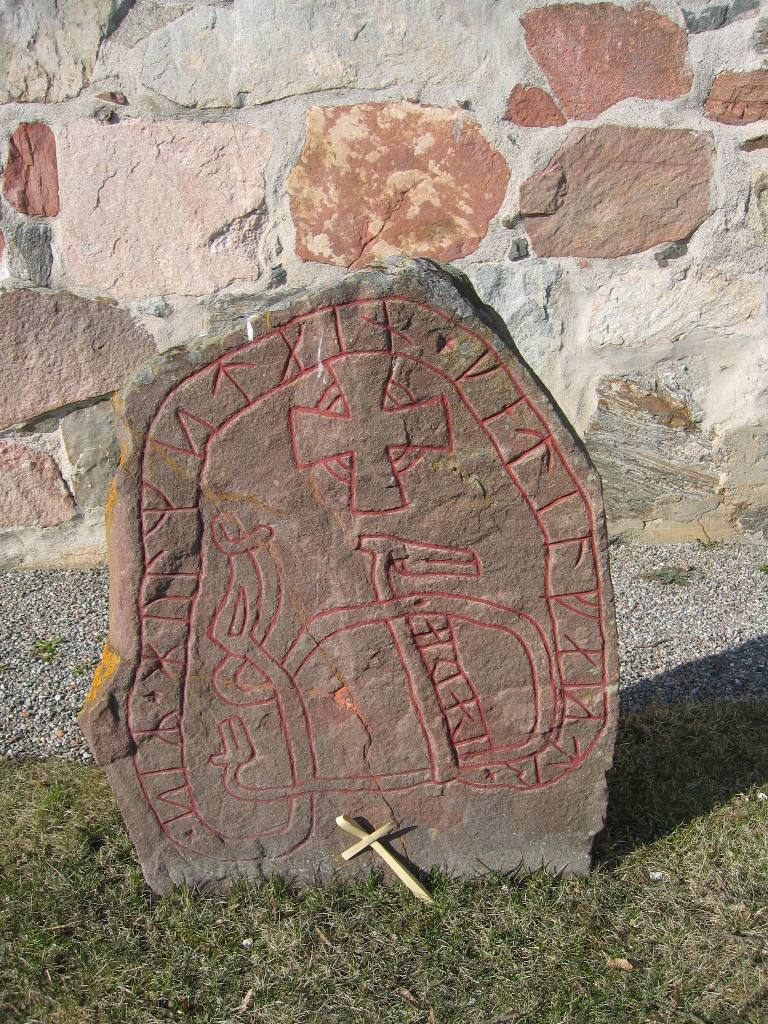
Runestone U 49

Runic inscription U 49 has runic text within a serpent that surrounds a cross. It is classified as being carved in runestone style Pr3, or Urnes style. It is believed to have been carved by the same runemaster as inscription U 50.

The stone is about one meter in height and is made of sandstone. It was discovered being used as the cornerstone of a tower of the Lovö church at the south wall. It was removed in 1935 and placed in its current location. Based upon their size and text, it has been suggested that U 49 and U 50 once were a coupled monument that was located in a cemetery, with the runic text ending before a name on U 49 and being continued on U 50.

=== Runic text ===
+ siʀ + hulmstain + ketilfastr + laþi a '

=== Old Norse transcription ===
Sigrøðr(?), Holmsteinn, Ketilfastr lagði(?) at(?)

=== English translation ===
Sigrøðr(?), Holmsteinn (and) Ketilfastr laid(?) in memory of(?)

== U 50 ==
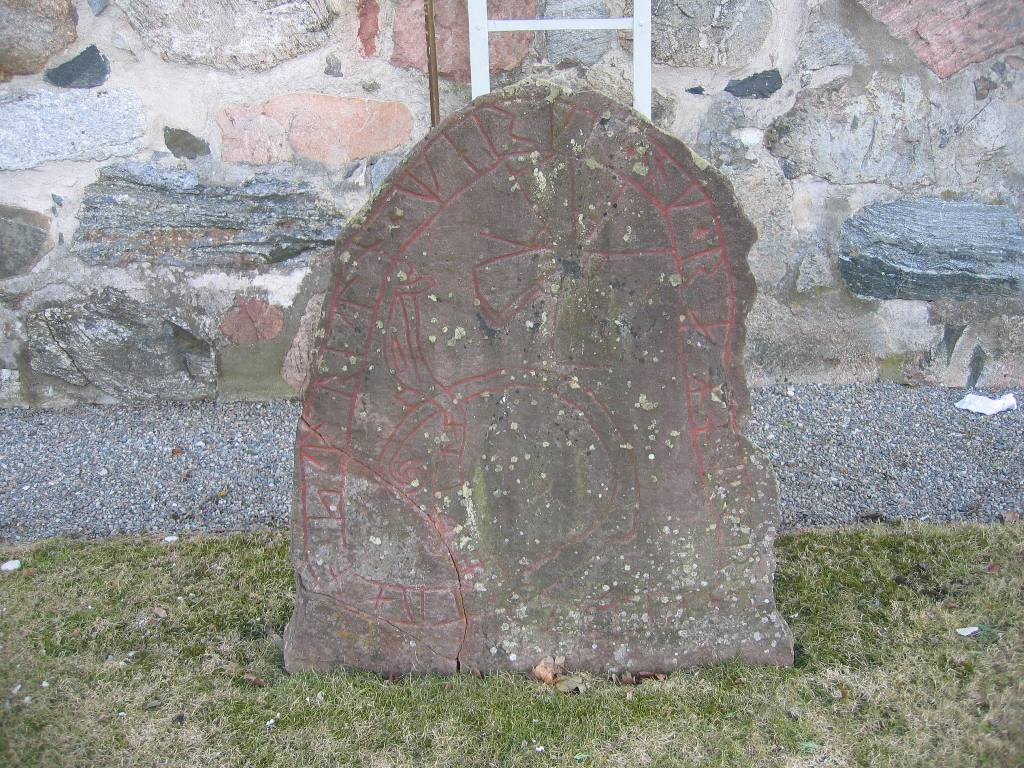
Runestone U 50

Runic inscription U 50 has runic text within a serpent that surrounds a cross. It is believed to have been carved by the same runemaster as inscription U 49.

The runestone was found being used as a cornerstone of a church tower and was removed to its current location in 1935. It is composed of red sandstone and is about one meter in height. As noted above, it has been suggested that U 49 and U 50 were once a coupled monument that was located in a cemetery with their text intended to be read together.

=== Runic text ===
+ iuan * stretn + merki + ok + rahnuor + eftiri boanta +

=== Old Norse transcription ===
Jóhan Streitinn merki ok Ragnvôr eptir bónda.

=== English translation ===
Jóhan the pugnacious(?) landmark; and Ragnvôr in memory of (her) husbandman.

== See also ==
- List of runestones
- Photograph of U 50 in 2006 - Stockholm Läns Museum
