= German submarine U-48 =

U-48 may refer to one of the following German submarines:

- SM U-48, a Type U 43 submarine launched in 1915 and that served in the First World War until scuttled on 24 November 1917
  - During the First World War, Germany also had these submarines with similar names:
    - SM UB-48, a Type UB III submarine launched in 1917 and scuttled on 28 October 1918
    - SM UC-48, a Type UC II submarine launched in 1916 and interned in Spain on 23 March 1918
- German submarine U-48 (1939), a Type VIIB submarine that served in the Second World War until scuttled on 3 May 1945
