= Old Bolshevik (disambiguation) =

Old Bolshevik (Russian: ста́рый большеви́к, stary bolshevik) was an unofficial designation for those who were members of the Bolshevik party before the Russian Revolution of 1917.

Old Bolshevik or Stary Bolshevik may also refer to:

- MV Stary Bolshevik
- Stary Bolshevik, a fictional ship from the novel Us Conductors
- Stary Bolshevik Publishers, a publishing house of the Society of Old Bolsheviks
