= MV Stary Bolshevik =

Soviet motor vessel

History

Soviet Union
- Name: Stary Bolshevik
- Owner: People's Commissariat for Water Transport (1933–1939); People's Commissariat of the Maritime Fleet (since 1939)
- Operator: (Soviet Union) Sovtorgflot's Baltic Directorate (1933–1935); (Soviet Union) Baltic Sea Shipping Company (1935–1939); (Soviet Union) Murmansk Shipping Company (1939–1942)
- Ordered: July 1, 1931
- Builder: Severnaya Verf, Leningrad
- Launched: 1932
- In service: January 1933
- Out of service: 1942
- Fate: Commissioned by the Northern Fleet, May 1942; Transferred to the Far-Eastern Shipping Company

→ Soviet Union
- Name: Stary Bolshevik
- Owner: People's Commissariat of the Maritime Fleet
- Operator: (Soviet Union) Northern Fleet
- Commissioned: May 1942
- Decommissioned: July 1943
- Honors and awards: Order of Lenin
- Fate: Returned to the Far-Eastern Shipping Company

Soviet Union
- Name: Stary Bolshevik
- Owner: People's Commissariat of the Maritime Fleet
- Operator: (Soviet Union) Far-Eastern Shipping Company
- In service: July 1943
- Out of service: August 1945
- Fate: Commissioned by the Pacific Fleet

Soviet Union
- Name: Stary Bolshevik
- Owner: People's Commissariat of the Maritime Fleet
- Operator: (Soviet Union) Pacific Fleet
- Commissioned: August 1945
- Decommissioned: September 1945
- Fate: Returned to the Far-Eastern Shipping Company

Soviet Union
- Name: Stary Bolshevik
- Owner: People's Commissariat of the Maritime Fleet (until 1946); Ministry of the Maritime Fleet (1946–1953, 1954–1969); Ministry of the Maritime and River Fleet (1953–1954)
- Operator: (Soviet Union) Far-Eastern Shipping Company
- In service: September 1945
- Out of service: 1969
- Identification: IMO number: 5338945
- Fate: Scrapped

General characteristics
- Class & type: Volgoles-class timber carrier
- Tonnage: 3,974 GRT; 5,920 t (5,830 long tons) DWT
- Displacement: 8,130 t (8,000 long tons; 8,960 short tons)
- Length: 111.1 m (364 ft 6 in)
- Beam: 15.7 m (51 ft 6 in)
- Draft: 6.3 m (20 ft 8 in)
- Installed power: 1,800 PS (1,780 hp)
- Propulsion: 1 × Sulzer diesel engine
- Speed: 10.5 kn (19.4 km/h; 12.1 mph)
- Capacity: 5,500 t (5,400 long tons; 6,100 short tons)
- Crew: 34
- Armament: Since the end of 1941: 3 × 45 mm (1.8 in) anti-aircraft guns; 2 × twin 7.62 mm Maxim machine guns; After repair in the USA: 1 × 5 in (127 mm) naval gun; 4–6 × 20 mm Oerlikon guns

Soviet ship Stary Bolshevik (Russian: Старый большевик, lit. 'Old Bolshevik') was a Soviet motor vessel, a timber carrier of the Volgoles class. It took part in several Arctic convoys of World War II as a general-purpose cargo ship. For the heroic actions while taking part in Convoy PQ 16 the ship was awarded the Order of Lenin, its captain, first mate, and helmsman were awarded the title Hero of the Soviet Union, and the whole crew were awarded various orders and medals.

== Actions ==
=== Spanish Civil War ===
The ship took part in Operation X, a secret Soviet weapons shipment to the Republicans during the Spanish Civil War.

=== Second World War ===
The first trip of the ship was from Arkhangelsk to the United Kingdom as part of Convoy QP 1 in September 1941. In January 1942 she brought military cargo to Murmansk as part of Convoy PQ 8. The next trip was with Convoy QP 7 to the United States with the load of apatites in February 1942, where she picked military equipment and returned to Iceland where it joined Convoy PQ 16.

==== Convoy PQ 16 ====
It was the fourth convoy (homeward leg of the 2nd round trip) for the ship. The ship was placed last in the order. It carried over 4,000 tonnes of munitions, including ammunition and explosives and A-20/Boston aircraft on the deck. The last one was an attractive target for German bombers and torpedo planes. On May 27, 1942, the ship was severely bombed and set on fire near Bear Island.

The Convoy PQ 16 commander invited the Soviet sailors to abandon the ship, that was in danger of exploding. During lulls between German attacks the neighbouring HMS Martin had approached and helped Stary Bolshevik with fire hoses and pumping the water out and with s doctor. On that occasion British sailors were surprised to learn that about 50 per cent of Stary Bolshevik's crew were women. The British destroyer wanted to pick up the crew and then to scuttle the motor vessel, the usual practice in convoys. The crew did not leave the ship and responded to this proposal with, "We are not going to bury the ship". Then the convoy went on, fighting off attacks by German aircraft and the burning transport was left alone with the fire.

For eight hours the Stary Bolshevik's crew fought to save their ship saving it and the cargo. The fire was extinguished, a patch was put on the holes and the transport moved to catch up with the convoy, arriving next day to the surprise of the convoy commodore. Seeing the damaged ship, with a hole in the side, a demolished funnel and a charred deck, the convoy commodore ordered the flag signal "Well done" hoist. On the evening of 30 May, Convoy PQ 16 entered Kola Bay.

The next trip of Stary Bolshevik was with Convoy QP 13 to Britain in June 1942 and then sailed to the Pacific Ocean for service at the Soviet Far East, and was subsequently used to move goods along the Pacific Route. The ship later underwent repairs in the United States.

===== Awards =====
Awarded the title Hero of the Soviet Union, Helmsman Boris Akazyonok, also had the combat assignment of an anti-aircraft gunner. In the commendation it was reported that due to his skilful manoeuvring he three times avoided torpedo attacks. When bombing caused fire, he was one of the first to rush into the cargo hold carrying bomb fuses to move them into a safer place. Operating the aft anti-aircraft gun he hit a German torpedo bomber. In 1942 Captain Ivan Afanasyev was awarded the title Hero of the Soviet Union. In 1943 he was awarded Officer of the Order of the British Empire (civil division). In 1942 First Mate and Deputy for Political Matters Konstantin Petrovsky was awarded the title Hero of the Soviet Union. In 1943 Chief Engineer Nikolay Pugachyov was awarded Member of the Order of the British Empire (civil division). The ship itself was awarded the Order of Lenin, displayed on her ensign.

== Bibliography ==
- Isayenko, Alexander (2003). Теплоход «Старый большевик» [Motor vessel Stary Bolshevik]. Modelist-Korabel Моделист-Корабел (in Russian). No. 2 #20. Tver. pp. 14–16.
- Petrov, Valentin P., ed. (2013). Старый большевик [Stary Bolshevik]. Кольская энциклопедия [Kola Encyclopedia] (in Russian). Vol. 4, П — Т. Murmansk: RUSMA. ISBN 978-5-905917-04-2.
- Ruegg, Bob; Hague, Arnold (1993) [1992]. Convoys to Russia (2nd rev. exp. pbk. ed.). Kendal: World Ship Society. ISBN 978-0-905617-66-4.
- Подвиг экипажа парохода «Старый большевик» [The feat of the Stary Bolshevik steamship's crew]. Музей морского флота [The Maritime Fleet Museum] (in Russian). May 26, 2017. Archived from the original on November 6, 2024.
- Yevseyev, Leonid (1976). «Старый большевик» [Stary Bolshevik]. Tekhnika Molodezhi Техника — молодёжи (in Russian). No. 6. Moscow. pp. 12–13. ISSN 0320-331X.
