= Ministry of the Maritime Fleet =

Government ministry of the Soviet Union

- Министерство морского флота СССР; Ministerstvo morskogo flota SSSR
- Soviet state and civil ensign (1955–1991)

Ministry overview
- Formed: 15 March 1946
- Preceding Ministry: People's Commissariat of the Maritime Fleet
- Dissolved: 26 December 1991
- Jurisdiction: Council of Ministers of the Soviet Union

Footnotes
- In 1953–1954 it was called the Ministry of the Maritime and River Fleet

The Ministry of the Maritime Fleet (Russian: Министерство морского флота СССР), usually abbreviated Minmorflot (Минморфлот) and also MMF, was a government ministry in the Soviet Union.

The Merchant Maritime Fleet of the USSR is abbreviated Morflot (Морфлот). All Soviet merchant fleet organizations and establishments were subordinate to the Ministry of the Maritime Fleet, abbreviated Minmorflot.

== History ==
Until 9 April 1939, functions of the Minmorflot were carried out by the People's Commissariat of Water Transport, which was responsible for both maritime and river fleets.

On 9 April 1939, the People's Commissariat of Water Transport was abolished and split into the People's Commissariat of the River Fleet and the People's Commissariat of the Maritime Fleet. The structure of the People's Commissariat of the Maritime Fleet as a separate people's commissariat was confirmed by a decree of the Council of People's Commissars on 25 May 1939.

On 15 March 1946, the People's Commissariat of the Maritime Fleet was renamed the Ministry of the Maritime Fleet by decree of the Supreme Soviet of the USSR, along with all the other people's commissariats, which also became ministries.

On 15 March 1953, Minmorflot was united with the Ministry of the River Fleet, becoming the Ministry of the Maritime and River Fleet.

By decree of the Presidium of the Supreme Soviet dated 25 August 1954, the Ministry of Maritime and River Fleet was re-established on 25 August 1954, when the Ministry of the Maritime Fleet and Ministry of the River Fleet was redivided.

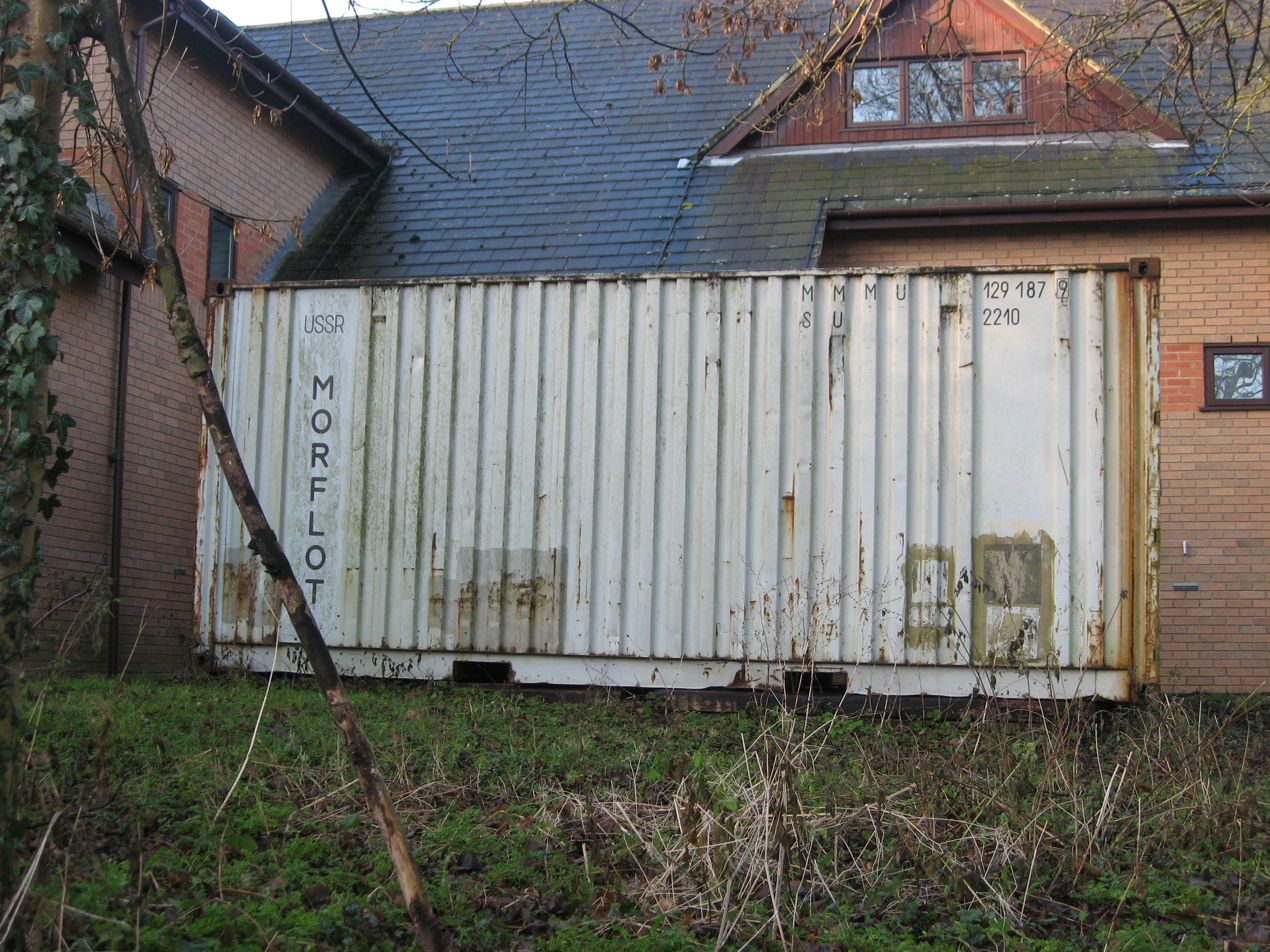
Morflot's 20-foot ISO container from the Soviet Union

Minmorflot was liquidated on 26 December 1991 due to the dissolution of the Soviet Union.

== Subordinate organizations and establishments ==
The Ministry of the Maritime Fleet was the head organization of Morflot. The main office of Minmorflot was in Moscow.

The following establishments were subordinated to Minmorflot in from 1970–1991:

- Sovfraht (Russian: Совфрахт, Soviet shipping agency)
- Register of the USSR, today Russian Maritime Register of Shipping
- Maritime Container Service (МРФ).
- Merchant Maritime Transport, abbreviated as Torgmortrans or TMT (Торговый морской транспорт, Торгмортранс).

The merchant marine was divided into shipping companies and sea routes. The following subordinate shipping companies to Minmorflot from 1960–1991:

- Baltic Sea Shipping Company, Leningrad
- Estonian Shipping Company, Tallinn
- Latvian Shipping Company, Riga
- Lithuanian Shipping Company, Klaypeda
- Black Sea Shipping Company, Odessa
- Azov Shipping Company, Mariupol
- Novorossiysk Shipping Company, Novorossiysk
- Georgian Shipping Company, Batumi
- Soviet Dunaj Shipping Company or Dunaj-Sea Shipping Company, Izmail
- Far East Shipping Company, Vladivostok
- PRISCO, Primorie (Seaside) Shipping Company, Nahodka
- Sakhalin Shipping Company, Kholmsk
- Kamchatska Shipping Company, Petropavlovsk-Kamchatsky
- Murmansk Shipping Company, Murmansk
- Sevmorput (Севморпуть), the organisation controlling the Arctic Northeast Passage Sea route.
- SVUMF (СВУМФ), the North-Eastern Directorate of the Maritime Fleet.
- Caspian Shipping Company, Baku
- Central Asian Shipping Company (Aral Sea)

Each Soviet seaport was part of the closest shipping company.

== List of ministers ==
Ministers of Minmorflot from March 1946 to March 1953:

Name	Date of taking office	Date of removal from office
Pyotr Petrovich Shirshov (1905—1953)	19 March 1946	30 March 1948
Alexander Alexandrovich Afanasyev (1903—1991)	30 March 1948	26 April 1948
Acting minicter Nikolai Vasilevich Novikov (1909—1971)	26 April 1948	23 October 1948
Nikolai Vasilevich Novikov (1909—1971)	23 October 1948	15 March 1953

Ministers of Minmorflot from August, 1954 to December, 1991:

Name	Date of taking office	Date of removal from office
Viktor Georgievich Bakaev (1902—1987)	28 August 1954	14 January 1970
Timofey Borisovich Guzhenko (1918—2008)	14 January 1970	27 September 1986
Yuri Mikhailovich Volmer (born in 1933)	24 October 1986	28 August 1991
Acting minister Yuri Mikhailovich Volmer (born in 1933)	28 August 1991	26 November 1991
