= Nikolai Janson =

Estonian revolutionary, communist

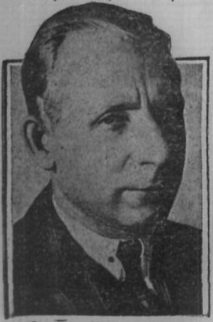

Prosecutor General of the Russian SFSR
- In office 16 January 1928 – May 1929
- Premier: Alexei Rykov
- Preceded by: Dmitry Kursky
- Succeeded by: Nikolai Krylenko

People's Commissar for Water Transport (NKVT)
- In office 30 January 1931 – 13 March 1934
- Premier: Vyacheslav Molotov
- Preceded by: Office established
- Succeeded by: Nikolay Pakhomov

Personal details
- Born: 24 November 1882 Saint Petersburg, Russian Empire
- Died: 20 June 1938 (aged 55) Moscow, Russian SFSR, Soviet Union
- Party: RSDLP (Bolsheviks) (1905–1918); Russian Communist Party (1918–1937)

Nikolay Mikhailovich Janson (24 November 1882 – 20 June 1938) was an Estonian revolutionary, Soviet politician and statesman.

Janson was born in Saint Petersburg. He was Prosecutor General of the Russian SFSR (named on 16 January 1928) and People's Commissar for Water Transport (named on 30 January 1931). On 13 March 1934 he was demoted to the post of Deputy People's Commissar for the offshore part. In July 1935 he lost that position, too, and in October 1935 he was named Deputy Chief of the Northern Sea Route. He was arrested on December 6, 1937, and accused of anti-Soviet espionage and sabotage. He was sentenced to death on 20 June 1938 and shot in Moscow on the same day. He was posthumously rehabilitated in 1955.
