= HMS Sharpshooter (J68) =

Minesweeper of the Royal Navy

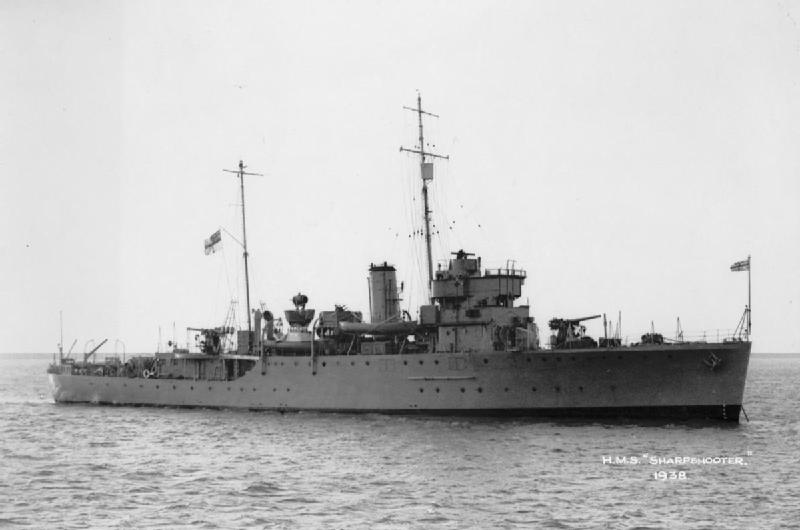
- HMS Sharpshooter 1938 IWM FL 18955

History

United Kingdom
- Name: HMS Sharpshooter
- Operator: Royal Navy
- Builder: HMNB Devonport
- Laid down: 8 June 1936
- Launched: 10 December 1936
- Commissioned: 17 December 1937
- Fate: Scrapped in November 1965

General characteristics
- Class & type: Halcyon-class minesweeper
- Displacement: 815–835 long tons (828–848 t); 1,310–1,372 long tons (1,331–1,394 t), full load
- Length: 245 ft 3 in (74.75 m)
- Beam: 33 ft 6 in (10.21 m)
- Draught: 9 ft (2.7 m)
- Propulsion: Steam turbines, 1750 shp
- Speed: 17 knots (31 km/h)
- Range: 7,200 nmi (13,330 km) at 10 knots (19 km/h)
- Complement: 80
- Armament: 2 × QF 4 in Mk.V (L/45 102 mm) guns, single mounts HA Mk.III; 4 × QF 0.5 in Mk.III (12.7 mm) Vickers machine guns, quad mount HA Mk.I

HMS Sharpshooter was a Halcyon-class minesweeper of the British Royal Navy. Built at Devonport Dockyard, Sharpshooter was completed in 1937. She served through the Second World War, acting both in her designed role as minesweeper and as a convoy escort, escorting several Arctic convoys. She took part in the evacuation from Dunkirk in 1940, and sank the German submarine U-655 in 1942.

Post war, she was converted to a survey ship, and was renamed HMS Shackleton in 1953. She was laid up into reserve in 1961 and sold for scrap in 1965.

== Design ==
The Halcyon class were a class of dedicated minesweepers, designed to be smaller and cheaper than the dual-purpose (minesweeping and colonial patrol vessel) minesweeping sloops that had been built since the late 1920s (i.e. the Bridgewater class, Hastings class and Shoreham class), which as their design evolved, were becoming increasingly focused on escort duties and becoming too large for use as minesweepers.

Sharpshooter was 245 feet 6 inches (74.83 m) long overall and 230 feet 0 inches (70.10 m) between perpendiculars, with a beam of 33 feet 6 inches (10.21 m) and a draught of 10 feet 3 inches (3.12 m) at deep load. Displacement was 835 long tons (848 t) standard and 1,330 long tons (1,350 t) deep load. Two Admiralty 3-drum water-tube boilers supplied steam to geared steam turbines driving two shafts. The machinery was rated at 1,750 shaft horsepower (1,300 kW) giving a speed of 17 knots (20 mph; 31 km/h).

Armament consisted of two QF 4 inch (102 mm) Mk V guns on High-Angle mounts and so capable of being used for anti-aircraft duties, with a close-in armament of one quadruple Vickers .50 machine gun mount. One of the 4-inch guns was removed during the Second World War, while the multiple machine guns were replaced by 4–8 Oerlikon 20 mm cannon. Up to 40 depth charges could be carried when used in the escort role. The ship had a crew of 80 officers and other ranks.

== Construction ==
Sharpshooter was ordered on 2 March 1936 under the 1935 shipbuilding programme and was laid down at Devonport Naval Dockyard on 8 June 1936. She was launched on 10 December 1936 and completed on 17 December 1937.

== Service ==
Following commissioning (where she received the pennant number N68 - this was changed to J68 in 1940) Sharpshooter joined the 1st Minesweeping Flotilla based at Portland. Along with the rest of her Flotilla, Sharpshooter moved to Scapa Flow, the Flotilla's war station, from August to September 1938 during the Munich crisis. With other ships of the flotilla she took part in the search in June 1939 for the submarine Thetis which had sunk in Liverpool Bay. She then operated with the flotilla in the Channel, and took part in the Royal Inspection (Reserve Fleet Review) at Portland on 9 August 1939.

=== Second World War ===
Sharpshooter was still a member of the 1st Minesweeping Flotilla in September 1939, at the outbreak of the Second World War.

The outbreak of war saw Sharpshooter clearing channels through minefields around Scapa Flow and off Loch Ewe and the Clyde estuary. At the end of May 1940, the British Expeditionary Force (BEF) was trapped by German forces at Dunkirk, France and it was decided to launch Operation Dynamo, the evacuation of the BEF from Dunkirk. Sharpshooter was one of the ships assigned to the evacuation. She made her first evacuation run on the morning of 29 May, landing 69 troops picked up from the Dunkirk beaches at Dover, with a second run made on the morning of the 30 May, picking up 273 troops. Sharpshooter was outbound on another run when at 22:10 hr, she collided with the Dover-bound steamer St Helier. Sharpshooter's bow was badly damaged, and she was towed back to Dover by the tugboat Foremost 22, the journey taking 11 hours. She was under repair at Sheerness dockyard and Leith until September 1940, the opportunity being taken to fit Sharpshooter with equipment for sweeping magnetic mines.

On 20 February 1941 Sharpshooter was approaching Harwich with sister ships Bramble, Britomart, Seagull and Speedy when they came under attack by two German aircraft. Bramble was hit by a German bomb that failed to explode, but damage was minimal. From April, Sharpshooter began to be used to escort convoys in the Western Approaches.

==== Arctic convoys ====
On 27 November 1941 she set out from Hvalfjord in Iceland as part of the escort of the Arctic convoy PQ 5 to Archangel in the Soviet Union. Sharpshooter remained in Russia, minesweeping and providing local escort for Arctic convoys as they arrived and left Russian ports. Convoys escorted included PQ 8, PQ 9/10, QP 7 and QP 9. On the night of 17/18 January 1942, Sharpshooter had just joined the escort of PQ 8 when the German submarine U-454 torpedoed and sank the destroyer Matabele. Sharpshooter helped to rescue survivors from Matebele then launched a counterattack against the submarine.

At about 8.25 pm on the evening of 24 March 1942 while escorting QP 9 the leading gunner on the forward four-inch gun of Sharpshooter spotted German submarine U-655 on the surface beam on, about two to three cables (370 to 556 meters) away and about 10 degrees off the minesweeper's starboard bow, with no crew apparently manning the conning tower or deck. Upon being called by the officer of the watch the captain Lieutenant-Commander David Lampen immediately called for emergency full ahead and called 'Stand by to ram'. ‘’Sharpsweeper’’ had just begun to gather speed when she struck the submarine just behind the conning tower. The submarine turned rolled over due to the impact and bumped along the minesweeper's port side sinking as it disappeared astern and sank stern first south-east of Bear Island, in approximate position 73.00N, 21.00E. No trace of the submarine or her crew of 45 was found except for two lifebuoys and what may have been a canvas dinghy. The bow of Sharpshooter was badly damaged by the collusion. After shoring up the forward mess deck, she continued at slow speed to Iceland independent of the convoy, and from there to Leith for repair. She was under repair until June 1942.

In September 1942, Sharpshooter formed part of the close escort for the Arctic convoy PQ 18, with Sharpshooter being used as a rescue ship to pick survivors from sunken ships as well as for more conventional escort duties. The convoy came under heavy air and submarine attack, with 13 ships in total being sunk. Sharpshooter rescued 101 survivors during the operation. In November 1942, Sharpshooter escorted the return convoy QP 15 to Iceland, but on 27 November, shortly after leaving the convoy, collided with the cargo ship Empire Snow, badly damaging the minesweeper.

==== Mediterranean ====
In April 1943 Sharpshooter was ordered to join the 12th Minesweeping Squadron in the Mediterranean, and in July the year took part in Operation Husky, the Allied invasion of Sicily. After Husky, Sharpshooter continued to carry out minesweeping and convoy escort operations in the Mediterranean until October 1944 when she returned to home waters.

=== Survey ship ===
In May 1945, Sharpshooter began conversion to a survey ship at Chatham Dockyard. Her armament was removed during this conversion, which continued until March 1946. On 3 April 1946, Sharpshooter was damaged in a collision with the merchant ship MV Fealtie. After repair and working up, she was deployed to Singapore, carrying out survey operations off Malaya and Borneo. During surveys of Penang, she discovered five submerged wrecks. On 13 October 1947 she collided with the merchant ship MV Celebes and after repair continued survey duties before returning to Britain at the start of 1948. After refit she recommissioned, receiving the new pennant number A310, and operating out of Lowestoft.

On 15 June 1953 she took part in the Coronation Fleet Review at Spithead, and on 1 July that year was renamed Shackleton. She ran aground in the Bristol Channel on 28 October 1958, damaging her sonar dome. On 20 August 1959, the prototype Handley Page Victor B2 bomber crashed into the Irish Sea. A large scale salvage effort was launched by the Royal Navy to locate and recover the wreckage, so the cause of the accident could be determined. Shackleton was diverted from her normal survey duties to take part in this search and salvage operation, and on 20 April, while searching for debris of the bomber, was diverted to the aid of a trawler, the Starbank, that had an uncontrolled leak. Shackleton transferred pumps over to the trawler, which allowed the leak to be controlled, and escorted Starbank to Milford Haven.

=== Disposal ===
Sharpshooter was refitted at Devonport in 1961, but was then immediately paid off into reserve. She was placed on the disposal list in 1965 and was sold to the British Iron & Steel Corporation (BISCO) for scrapping. The ship was allocated to the West of Scotland Shipbreaking Company, and arrived at their Troon yard for breaking up on 3 November 1965.

== Bibliography ==
- Blackman, Raymond V. B. (1962). Jane's Fighting Ships 1962–63. London: Sampson Low, Marston & Co., Ltd.
- Blair, Clay (2000). Hitler's U-Boat War: The Hunters 1939–1942. London: Cassell & Co. ISBN 0-304-35260-8.
- Brown, David K. (2012). Nelson to Vanguard: Warship Design and Development 1923–1945. Barnsley, UK: Seaforth Publishing. ISBN 978-1-84832-149-6.
- Busch, Rainer; Röll, Hans-Joachim (1999). German U-boat Commanders of World War II: A Biographical Dictionary. Translated by Brooks, Geoffrey. London, Annapolis, Md: Greenhill Books, Naval Institute Press. ISBN 1-55750-186-6.
- Gardiner, Robert; Chesneau, Roger, eds. (1980). Conway's All The World's Fighting Ships 1922–1946. London: Conway Maritime Press. ISBN 0-85177-146-7.
- Hague, Arnold (1993). Sloops: A History of the 71 Sloops Built in Britain and Australia for the British, Australian and Indian Navies 1926–1946. Kendal, England: World Ship Society. ISBN 0-905617-67-3.
- H.M. Ships Damaged or Sunk by Enemy Action: 3rd. SEPT. 1939 to 2nd. SEPT. 1945 (PDF). Admiralty. 1952. Archived from the original (PDF) on 10 June 2016.
- Lenton, H. T.; Colledge, J. J. (1973). Warships of World War II (Second ed.). Shepperton, UK: Ian Allan. ISBN 0-7110-0403-X.
- Middleton, Don (Winter 1993). "Testing the Victor". Air Enthusiast. No. 52. pp. 60–75. ISSN 0143-5450.
- Paterson, Lawrence (2016). Steel and Ice: The U-Boat Battle in the Arctic and Black Sea 1941-45. Stroud, Gloucestershire: The History Press. ISBN 978-1-59114-258-4.
- Rohwer, Jürgen; Hümmelchen, Gerhard (1992). Chronology of the War at Sea 1939–1945. London: Greenhill Books. ISBN 1-85367-117-7.
- Ruegg, Bob; Hague, Arnold (1992). Convoys to Russia 1941–1945. Kendal, UK: World Ship Society. ISBN 0-905617-66-5.
- Winser, John de S. (1999). B.E.F. Ships: Before, at and after Dunkirk. Gravesend, UK: World Ship Society. ISBN 0-905617-91-6.
- Worth, Jack (1984). British Warships Since 1945: Part 4: Minesweepers. Liskeard, UK: Maritime Books. ISBN 0-907771-12-2.
