= Nikolay Pakhomov =

Soviet politician

- Николай Пахомов
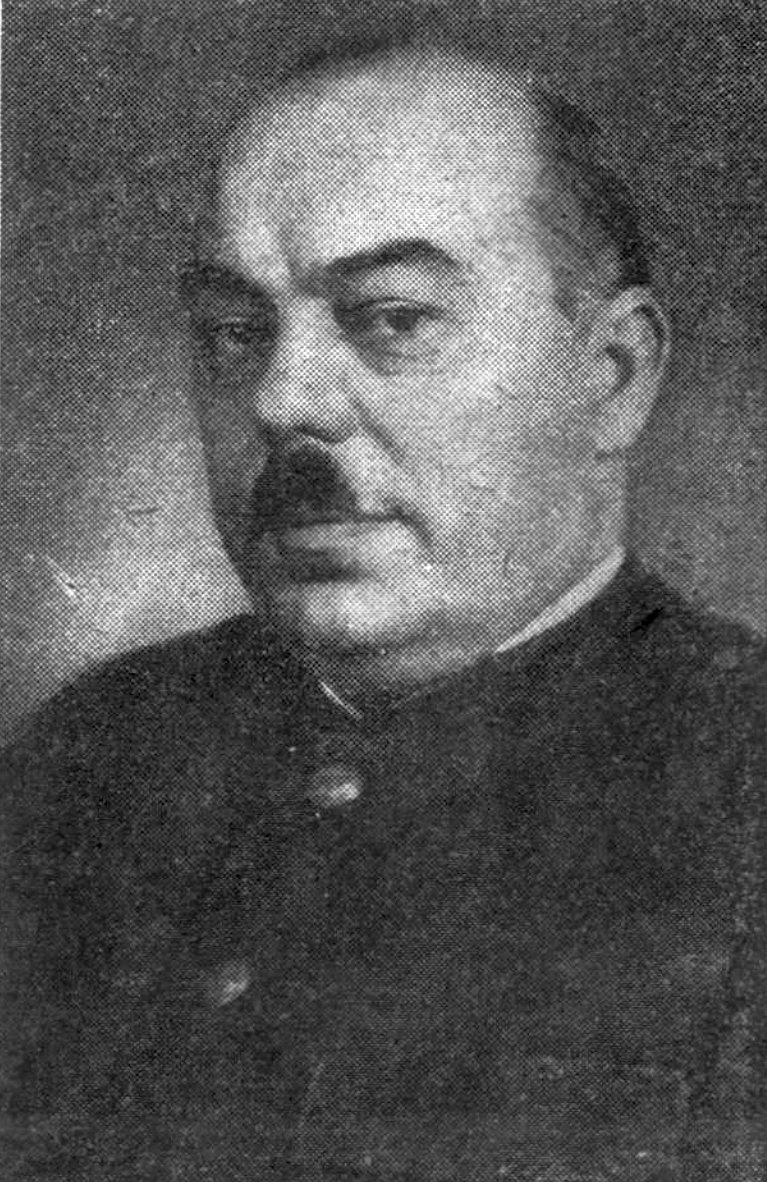
- Pakhomov in 1938

People's Commissar for Water Transport (NKVT)
- In office 13 March 1934 – 8 April 1938
- Premier: Vyacheslav Molotov
- Preceded by: Nikolai Janson
- Succeeded by: Nikolai Yezhov

Personal details
- Born: December 1890 Taganrog, Don Host Oblast, Russian Empire
- Died: 19 August 1938 (aged 47) Moscow, Soviet Union
- Cause of death: Execution by shooting
- Party: RSDLP (Mensheviks) (1909–1917); Russian Communist Party (Bolsheviks) (1917–1938)

Nikolay Ivanovich Pakhomov (Russian: Николай Иванович Пахомов; December 1890 – 19 August 1938) was a Soviet politician and government official.

== Biography ==
Pakhomov was born in Taganrog into the family of a port loader. From 1902, Pakhomov worked in handicraft workshops, and since 1909 at the Taganrog Metallurgical Plant. He joined the RSDLP (Mensheviks) in 1909 and was expelled from the plant for his revolutionary activity.

Pakhomov joined the Bolsheviks in 1917 and actively participated in the revolutionary events of 1917 in Melitopol Plant, and on December 20, 1917, he was elected chairman of the Melitopol Soviet of Workers' and Soldiers' Deputies.

From 1918 to 1921 Pakhomov served in the Red Army. From 1919 he was the head of the political department of the 58th division of the 12th Army.

He was People's Commissar for Water Transport from 13 March 1934 to 8 April 1938. The very next day after being demoted (9 April 1938), he was arrested. He was charged with espionage, then sentenced to death and shot, in Moscow. He was posthumously rehabilitated in 1955.
