= Nikolai Yezhov =

NKVD director under Joseph Stalin (1895–1940)

- Николай Ежов
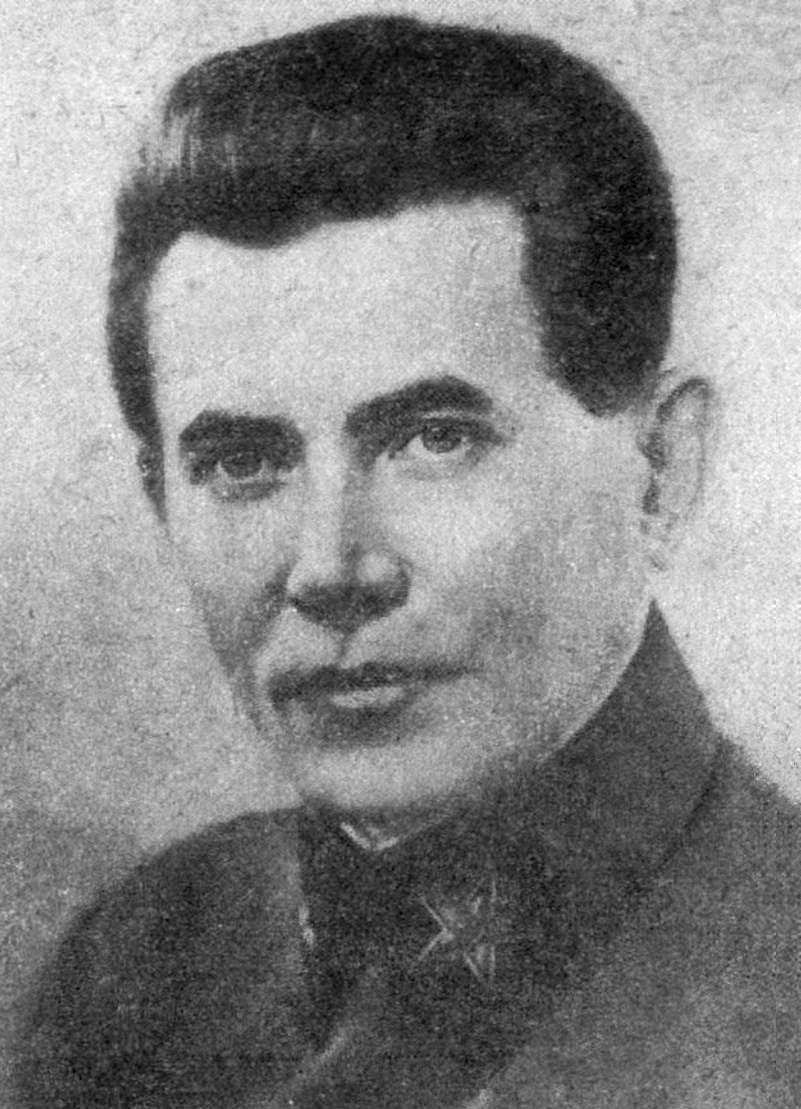
- Yezhov in 1938

People's Commissar for Water Transport (NKVT)
- In office 8 April 1938 – 9 April 1939
- Premier: Vyacheslav Molotov
- Preceded by: Nikolay Pakhomov
- Succeeded by: None (position abolished)

People's Commissar for Internal Affairs (NKVD)
- In office 26 September 1936 – 25 November 1938
- Premier: Vyacheslav Molotov
- Preceded by: Genrikh Yagoda
- Succeeded by: Lavrentiy Beria

Chairman of the Party Control Commission of the Central Committee
- In office 1935–1939
- Premier: Vyacheslav Molotov
- Preceded by: Lazar Kaganovich
- Succeeded by: Andrey Andreyev

Full member of the 17th Central Committee
- In office 10 February 1934 – 3 March 1939

Candidate member of the 17th Politburo
- In office 12 October 1937 – 3 March 1939

Member of the 17th Secretariat
- In office 1 February 1935 – 3 March 1939

Personal details
- Born: Nikolai Ivanovich Yezhov; 1 May 1895 St. Petersburg, Russian Empire
- Died: 4 February 1940 (aged 44) Moscow, Russian SFSR, Soviet Union
- Cause of death: Execution by shooting
- Citizenship: Soviet
- Party: All-Union Communist Party (Bolsheviks) (1917–1939)
- Spouses: Antonia Titova (m. 1919; div. 1930) Yevgenia Feigenberg (m. 1930; died 1938)
- Children: 1 (adopted)
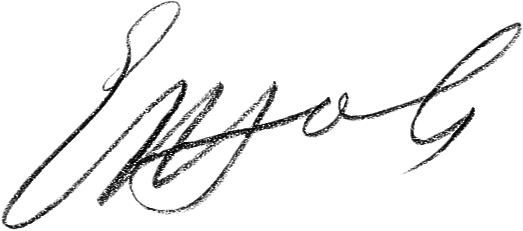
- Signature
- Nickname(s): Yezhevika (Ежевика; "Blackberry"); Iron Commissar; Iron Hedgehog; The Bloody Dwarf

Military service
- Allegiance: Russian Empire (1915–1917); Russian Soviet Federative Socialist Republic (1919–1921); Soviet Union (1936–1938)
- Branch/service: Imperial Russian Army; Red Army; NKVD
- Years of service: 1915–1917; 1919–1921; 1936–1938
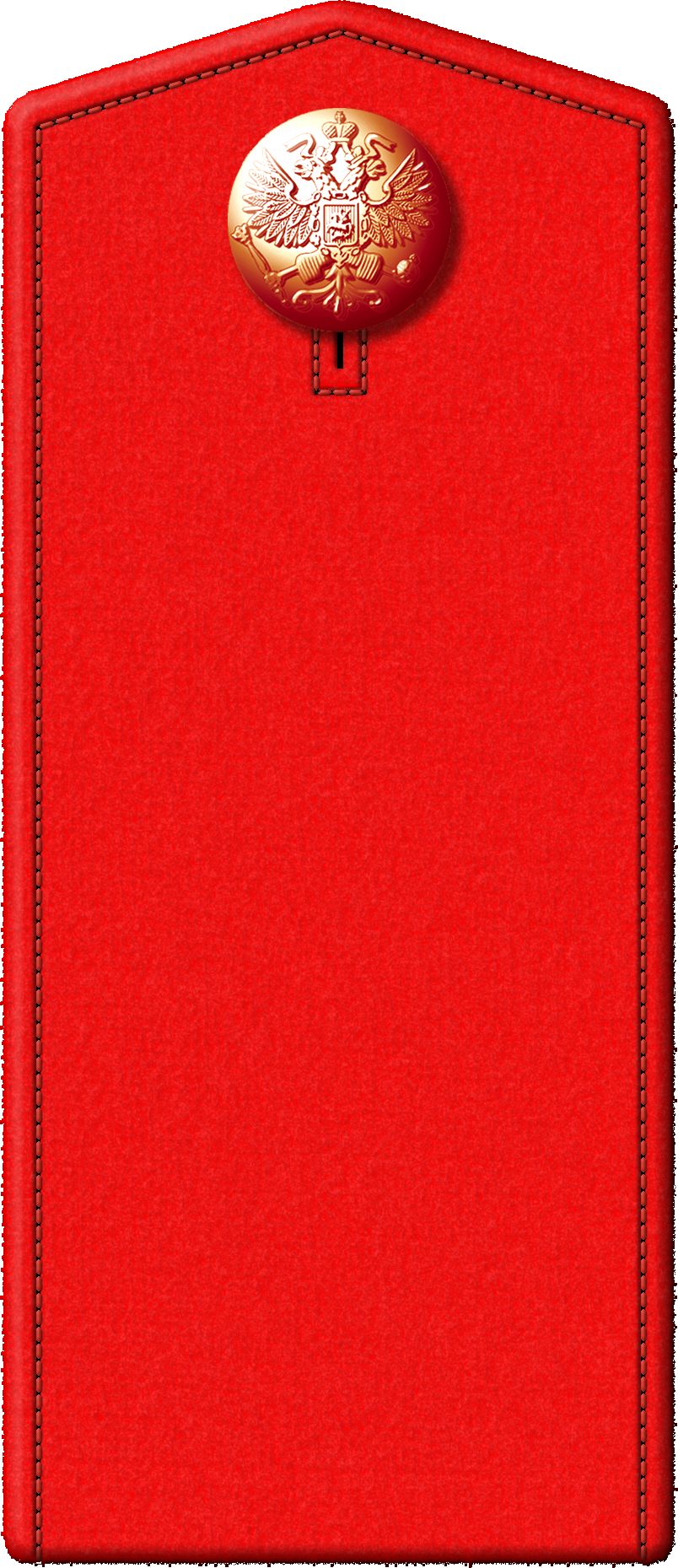
- Rank: Private (1915–1917); Commissioner General of State Security (1936–1938)
- Battles/wars: World War I

Nikolai Ivanovich Yezhov (Russian: Николай Иванович Ежов, IPA: [nʲɪkɐˈlaj ɪˈvanəvʲɪtɕ (j)ɪˈʐof]; 1 May 1895 – 4 February 1940), also spelt Ezhov, was a Soviet secret police official, who served under Joseph Stalin as head of the NKVD from 1936 to 1938, at the height of the Great Purge.

Yezhov organized mass arrests, torture, and executions during the Great Purge. However, he later fell out of favor with Joseph Stalin and was arrested. During his interrogation, Yezhov confessed to various alleged anti-Soviet activities, including making "unfounded arrests" during the Great Purge. He was executed in 1940 shortly after his arrest and conviction, and was later blamed for many of the excesses committed during the Great Purge.

== Early life and career ==
For most of his life, Yezhov reported that he was born in Saint Petersburg. However, during interrogations, he claimed to have lied about his birthplace to "portray (himself) in the guise of a deeply-rooted proletarian", instead stating that, according to his mother, he was born in Marijampolė, Suwałki Governorate (modern-day Lithuania). He also confessed to lying about his socioeconomic background, relating that his father Ivan Yezhov came from a well-off Russian peasant family from Volkhonshino, a village located in Krapivna, Tula Oblast, while his mother Anna Antonovna Yezhova was Lithuanian. Lying about one's background to avoid persecution in the Soviet Union was not uncommon; however, the reliability of Yezhov's confessions has been questioned, as they may have been forced or fabricated by his interrogators.

According to Yezhov, his father went to Marijampolė while serving in a military band, and after being demobilized, he worked as railroad switchman and forest warden. On further questioning, he acknowledged his father ran a teahouse which operated as a front for a brothel, becoming a housepainting contractor when the business shut down. Despite writing in his official biographical forms that he knew Lithuanian and Polish, he denied this in his later interrogations. Yezhov instead claimed that while both of his parents were Lithuanian speakers, he only learnt a few phrases and words of Lithuanian and Polish, as well as some Yiddish, during his later military service.

He completed only his elementary education. From 1909 to 1915, he worked as a tailor's assistant and factory worker. From 1915 until 1917, Yezhov served in the Imperial Russian Army. He joined the Bolsheviks on 5 May 1917, in Vitebsk, six months before the October Revolution. During the Russian Civil War (1917–1922), he fought in the Red Army. After February 1922, he worked in the political system, mostly as a secretary of various regional committees of the Communist Party. In 1927, he was transferred to the Accounting and Distribution Department of the Party where he worked as an instructor and acting head of the department. From 1929 to 1930, he was the Deputy People's Commissar for Agriculture. In November 1930, he was appointed head of several departments of the Communist Party: the departments of special affairs, personnel, and industry. In 1934, he was elected to the Central Committee of the Communist Party; in the next year he became a secretary of the Central Committee. From February 1935 to March 1939, he was also the Chairman of the Central Commission for Party Control.

Nadezhda Mandelstam, who met Yezhov at Sukhum in the early thirties, did not perceive anything ominous in his manner or appearance; her impression of him was that of a "modest and rather agreeable person".

== Head of the NKVD ==
A turning point for Yezhov came with Stalin's response to the 1934 murder of the Bolshevik chief of Leningrad, Sergei Kirov. Stalin used the murder as a pretext for further purges, and he personally chose Yezhov to carry out the task. Yezhov oversaw falsified accusations in the Kirov murder case against opposition leaders Kamenev, Zinoviev, and their supporters. Yezhov's success in this task led to his further promotion and ultimately to his appointment as head of the NKVD.

He was appointed People's Commissar for Internal Affairs (head of the NKVD) and a member of the Central Committee on 26 September 1936, following the dismissal of Genrikh Yagoda. This appointment did not at first seem to suggest an intensification of the purge: "Unlike Yagoda, Yezhov did not come out of the 'organs', which was considered an advantage". As opposed to the unpopular Yagoda, Yezhov was a well liked figure in the party, known for his hard work and loyalty. Many welcomed his appointment. In a letter to Sergo Ordzhonikidze, Stalin ally Lazar Kaganovich wrote "surely, things will go smoothly with Yezhov at the helm". Even Nikolai Bukharin enjoyed good personal relations with him; he considered Yezhov an "honest person" who would not fabricate cases.

Yezhov's first task from Stalin was to personally investigate and conduct prosecution of his long-time Chekist mentor Yagoda, which he did with remorseless zeal. Yezhov ordered the NKVD to sprinkle mercury on the curtains of his office so that the physical evidence could be collected and used to support the charge that Yagoda was a German spy, sent to assassinate Yezhov and Stalin with poison and restore capitalism. Yezhov later admitted under interrogation on 5 May 1939 that he had fabricated the mercury poisoning to "raise his authority in the eyes of the leadership of the country". It is also claimed that he personally tortured both Yagoda and Marshal Mikhail Tukhachevsky to extract their confessions.

The Gulag newspaper, Perekovka ("Reforging"), front page announcing the replacement of Genrikh Yagoda by Nikolai Yezhov

Yagoda was but the first of many to die by Yezhov's orders. Under Yezhov, the Great Purge reached its height during 1937–1938. 50–75% of the members of the Supreme Soviet and officers of the Soviet military were stripped of their positions and imprisoned, exiled to the Gulag in Siberia, or executed. In addition, a much greater number of ordinary Soviet citizens were accused (usually on flimsy or nonexistent evidence) of disloyalty or "wrecking" by local Chekist troikas and similarly punished to fill Stalin and Yezhov's arbitrary quotas for arrests and executions. Yezhov also conducted a thorough purge of the security organs, both NKVD and GRU, removing and executing not only many officials who had been appointed by his predecessors Yagoda and Menzhinsky, but even his own appointees as well. Yezhov admitted that some innocent people were being falsely accused, but he dismissed their lives as being unimportant so long as the purge was successful:

There will be some innocent victims in this fight against Fascist agents. We are launching a major attack on the Enemy; let there be no resentment if we bump someone with an elbow. Better that ten innocent people should suffer than one spy get away. When you chop wood, chips fly.

In 1937 and 1938 alone, at least 1.3 million were arrested and 681,692 were shot for "crimes against the state". The Gulag population swelled by 685,201 under Yezhov, nearly tripling in size in just two years, with at least 140,000 of these prisoners (and likely many more) dying of malnutrition, exhaustion and the elements in the camps (or during transport to them).

== Fall from power ==
Yezhov was appointed People's Commissar for Water Transport on 6 April 1938. During the Great Purge, acting on the orders from Stalin, he had accomplished liquidation of Old Bolsheviks and other potentially "disloyal elements" or "fifth columnists" within the Soviet military and government prior to the onset of war with Germany. The defection to Japan of the Far Eastern NKVD chief, Genrikh Lyushkov, on 13 June 1938, rightly worried Yezhov, who had earlier protected Lyushkov from the purges and now feared that he would be blamed for disloyalty.

== Final days ==
On 22 August 1938, NKVD leader Lavrenty Beria was named as Yezhov's deputy. Beria had managed to survive the Great Purge and the "Yezhovshchina" during the years 1936–1938, even though he had almost become one of its victims. Earlier in 1938, Yezhov had even ordered the arrest of Beria, who was party chief in Georgia. However, Georgian NKVD chief Sergo Goglidze alerted Beria, who immediately flew to Moscow to see Stalin personally. Beria convinced Stalin to spare his life and reminded Stalin how efficiently he had carried out party orders in Georgia and Transcaucasia. Yezhov eventually fell in the struggle for power, and Beria became the new NKVD chief.

Over the following months, Beria (with Stalin's approval) began to usurp Yezhov's governance of the Commissariat for Internal Affairs. As early as 8 September, Mikhail Frinovsky, Yezhov's first deputy, was relocated from under his command into the Navy. Stalin's penchant for periodically executing and replacing his primary lieutenants was well known to Yezhov, as he had previously been the man most directly responsible for orchestrating such actions.

Well acquainted with typical Stalinist bureaucratic precursors to eventual dismissal and arrest, Yezhov recognized Beria's increasing influence with Stalin as a sign that his downfall was imminent, and he plunged headlong into alcoholism and despair. Already a heavy drinker, in the last weeks of his service, he reportedly was disconsolate, slovenly, and drunk nearly all of his waking hours, rarely bothering to show up to work. As anticipated, Stalin and Vyacheslav Molotov, in a report dated 11 November, sharply criticised the work and methods of the NKVD during Yezhov's tenure as chief, thus establishing the bureaucratic pretense necessary to remove him from power.

On 14 November, another of Yezhov's protégés, the Ukrainian NKVD chief Aleksandr Uspensky, disappeared after being warned by Yezhov that he was in trouble. Stalin suspected that Yezhov was involved in the disappearance and told Beria, not Yezhov, that Uspensky must be caught (he was arrested on 14 April 1939). Yezhov had told his wife, Yevgenia, on 18 September that he wanted a divorce, and she had begun writing increasingly despairing letters to Stalin, none of which were answered. She was particularly vulnerable because of her many lovers, and for months people close to her were being arrested. On 19 November 1938, Yevgenia committed suicide by an overdose of sleeping pills.

At his own request, Yezhov was officially relieved of his post as the People's Commissar for Internal Affairs on 25 November, succeeded by Beria, who had been in complete control of the NKVD since the departure of Frinovsky on 8 September. He attended his last Politburo meeting on 29 January 1939.

Stalin was evidently content to ignore Yezhov for several months, finally ordering Beria to denounce him at the annual Presidium of the Supreme Soviet. On 3 March 1939, Yezhov was relieved of all his posts in the Central Committee but retained his post as People's Commissar of Water Transportation. His last working day was 9 April, at which time the "People’s Commissariat was simply abolished by splitting it into two, the People’s Commissariats of the River Fleet and the Sea Fleet, with two new People’s Commissars, Z. A. Shashkov and S. S. Dukel’skii."

=== Arrest ===
On 10 April, Yezhov was arrested and imprisoned at the Sukhanovka prison; the "arrest was painstakingly concealed, not only from the general public but also from most NKVD officers ... It would not do to make a fuss about the arrest of 'the leader’s favourite,' and Stalin had no desire to arouse public interest in NKVD activity and the circumstances of the conduct of the Great Terror." A letter from Beria, Andreyev and Malenkov to Stalin, dated 29 January 1939, accused the NKVD of allowing "massive, unfounded arrests of completely innocent persons", and stated that the leadership of Yezhov "did not put a stop to this kind of arbitrariness and extremism ... but sometimes itself abetted it."

Yezhov was interrogated by Acting Chief Military Prosecutor Nikolai Afanasiev. In his confession, Yezhov admitted to the standard litany of state crimes necessary to mark him as an "enemy of the people" prior to execution, including "wrecking", official incompetence, theft of government funds, and treasonous collaboration with German spies and saboteurs. Apart from these political crimes, he was also accused of and confessed to a humiliating history of sexual promiscuity, including homosexuality, rumors that were later deemed true by some post-Soviet examinations of the case.

=== Trial ===
On 2 February 1940, Yezhov was tried behind closed doors by the Military Collegium, chaired by Soviet judge Vasiliy Ulrikh. Yezhov, like his predecessor Yagoda, maintained to the end his love for Stalin. Yezhov denied being a spy, a terrorist, or a conspirator, stating that he preferred "death to telling lies". He maintained that his previous confession had been obtained under torture, admitted that he had purged 14,000 of his fellow Chekists, but said that he was surrounded by "enemies of the people".

Yezhov's determination to assert his innocence was something few of the victims of the Stalinist purges shared. In his final statement at his trial, he defended his record vehemently, though it did not save his life.

I am charged with corruption as pertaining to my morals and my private life. But where are the facts? I have been in the public eye of the Party for 25 years. During these 25 years everyone saw me, everyone loved me for my modesty and honesty. I do not deny that I drank heavily, but I worked like a horse. Where is my corruption? I understand and honestly declare that the only cause for sparing my life would be for me to admit that I am guilty of the charges brought against me, to repent before the Party and to implore it to spare my life. Perhaps the Party will spare my life when taking my services into account. But the Party has never had any need of lies, and I am once again declaring to you, that I was not a Polish spy, and I do not want to admit guilt to that charge because such an admission would only be a gift to the Polish landowners, just as admitting guilt to espionage activity for England and Japan would only be a gift to the English lords and Japanese samurai. I refuse to give such gifts to those gentlemen...

I’ll now finish my final address. I ask the Military Collegium to grant me the following requests: 1. My fate is obvious. My life, naturally, will not be spared since I myself have contributed to this at my preliminary investigation. I ask only one thing: Shoot me quietly, without putting me through any agony. 2. Neither the Court nor the CC will believe in my innocence. If my mother is alive, I ask that she be provided for in her old age, and that my daughter be taken care of. 3. I ask that my nephews not be subjected to punitive measures because they are not guilty of anything. 4. I ask that the Court investigate thoroughly the case of Zhurbenko, whom I considered and still consider to be an honest man devoted to the Leninist-Stalinist cause. 5. I request that Stalin be informed that I have never in my political life deceived the Party, a fact known to thousands of persons, who know my honesty and modesty. I request that Stalin be informed that I am a victim of circumstances and nothing more, yet here enemies I have overlooked may have also had a hand in this. Tell Stalin that I shall die with his name on my lips.

After the secret trial, Yezhov was allowed to return to his cell; half an hour later, he was called back and told that he had been condemned to death. On hearing the verdict, Yezhov became faint and began to collapse, but the guards caught him and removed him from the room. "Procurator Afanasiev came to his cell to point out to him that he had the right to apply to the Supreme Soviet for pardon and commutation of the death sentence." A bewildered Yezhov replied: "Yes, yes, comrade procurator, I want to appeal for pardon. Maybe comrade Stalin will do that." However, his appeal for clemency was immediately denied, and when he was informed, Yezhov became hysterical and wept. He soon had to be dragged out of the room, struggling with the guards and screaming.

=== Execution ===
On 4 February 1940, Yezhov was shot in the basement of a small NKVD station on Varsonofevskii Lane (Varsonofyevskiy pereulok) in Moscow. The basement had a wall made of logs and a sloping floor so that it could be hosed down after executions, and had been built according to Yezhov's own specifications near the Lubyanka. The main NKVD execution chamber in the basement of the Lubyanka was deliberately avoided to ensure total secrecy. According to biographers Marc Jansen and Nikita Petrov, he "must have been executed by the NKVD Commandant", Vasili Blokhin, with Afanasev and the Deputy Chief of the NKVD's "First Special Department", Leonid Bashtakov as witnesses. However, Russian author and former GRU officer Viktor Suvorov claimed in his 1984 book Inside Soviet Military Intelligence that there were "grounds for believing that" future KGB chairman Ivan Serov "played a personal part" in Yezhov's death, although he did not elaborate. According to Afanasev, before the execution Yezhov had a hysterical breakdown, he struggled, screamed and had to be dragged to the shooting site by his hands

Yezhov's body was immediately cremated, and his ashes dumped in a common grave at Moscow's Donskoye Cemetery. The execution remained a secret, and as late as 1948, an article in Time magazine reported rumours that he was still alive and being held "in an insane asylum".

== Personal life ==
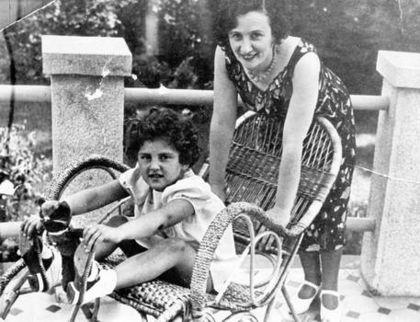
Yezhov's wife Yevgenia with their adopted daughter Natalia

Yezhov married Antonina Titova (Russian: Антонина Алексеевна Титова), a minor Communist Party clerk, in 1917, but he later divorced her and married Yevgenia Feigenberg (Khayutina-Yezhova), a Soviet publishing worker and Chief Editor of USSR in Construction magazine who was known for her friendship with many Soviet writers and actors. Yezhov and Feigenburg had an adopted daughter, Natalia, an orphan from a children's home. After Yevgenia's and Yezhov's deaths in late 1938 and 1940, respectively, Natalia was sent back to a local orphanage and was forced to relinquish the Yezhov surname. Yezhov, knowing that Stalin would usually eliminate the entire family of the condemned, pleaded to spare his daughter's life upon his imminent murder; she survived. Subsequently, she was known by the name Natalia Khayutina.

=== Accusation of homosexuality ===
Yezhov was accused of homosexual acts. When Yezhov was arrested in 1939, he was interrogated at Sukhanovo Prison. He stated during his interrogation that he had many lovers, including Filipp Goloshchyokin, then party functionary in Kazakh ASSR, during the latter half of 1925, and that they had shared an apartment in Kyzylorda. The reliability of these claims is unclear, as they may have been induced under the influence of torture.

== Legacy ==
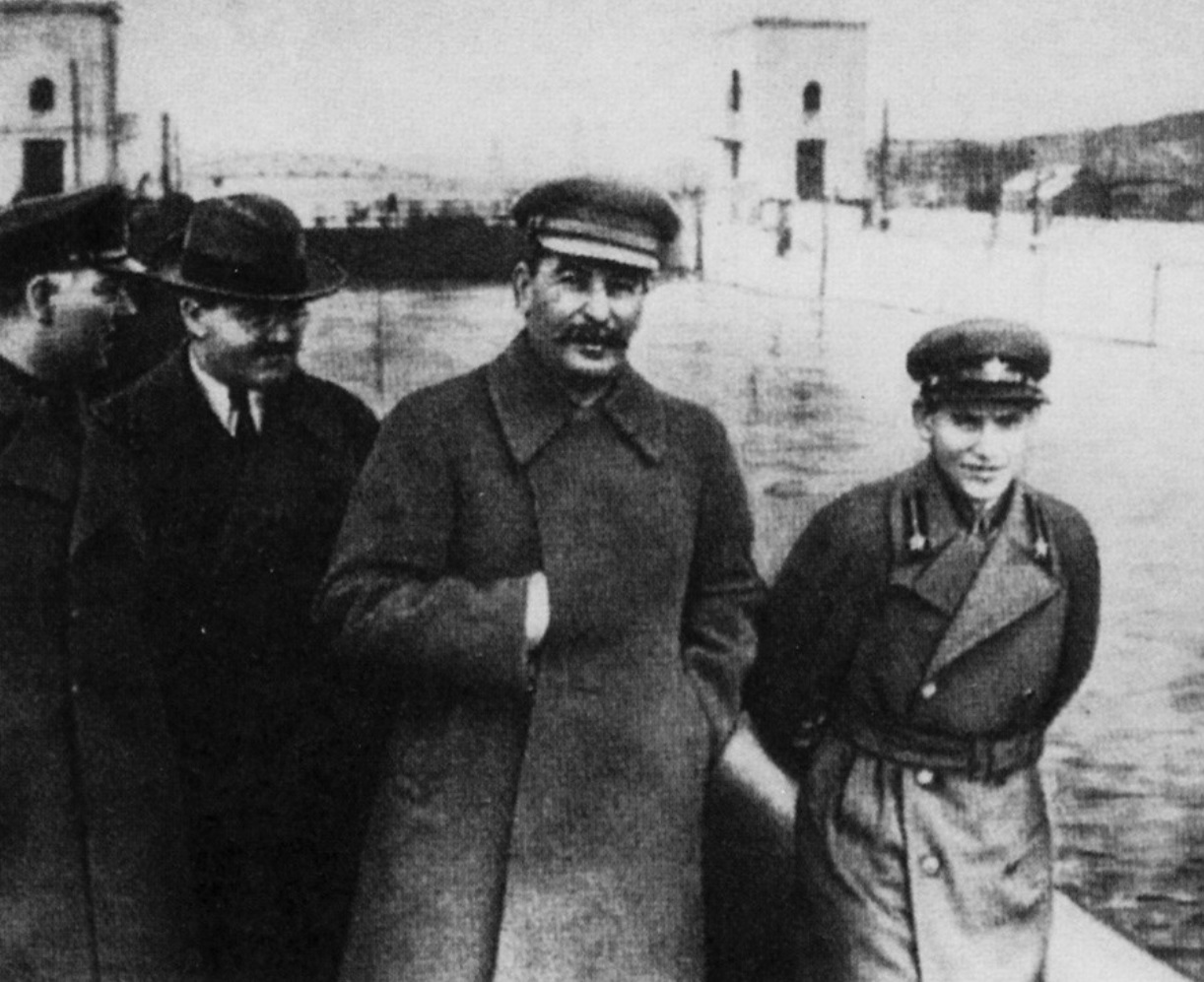

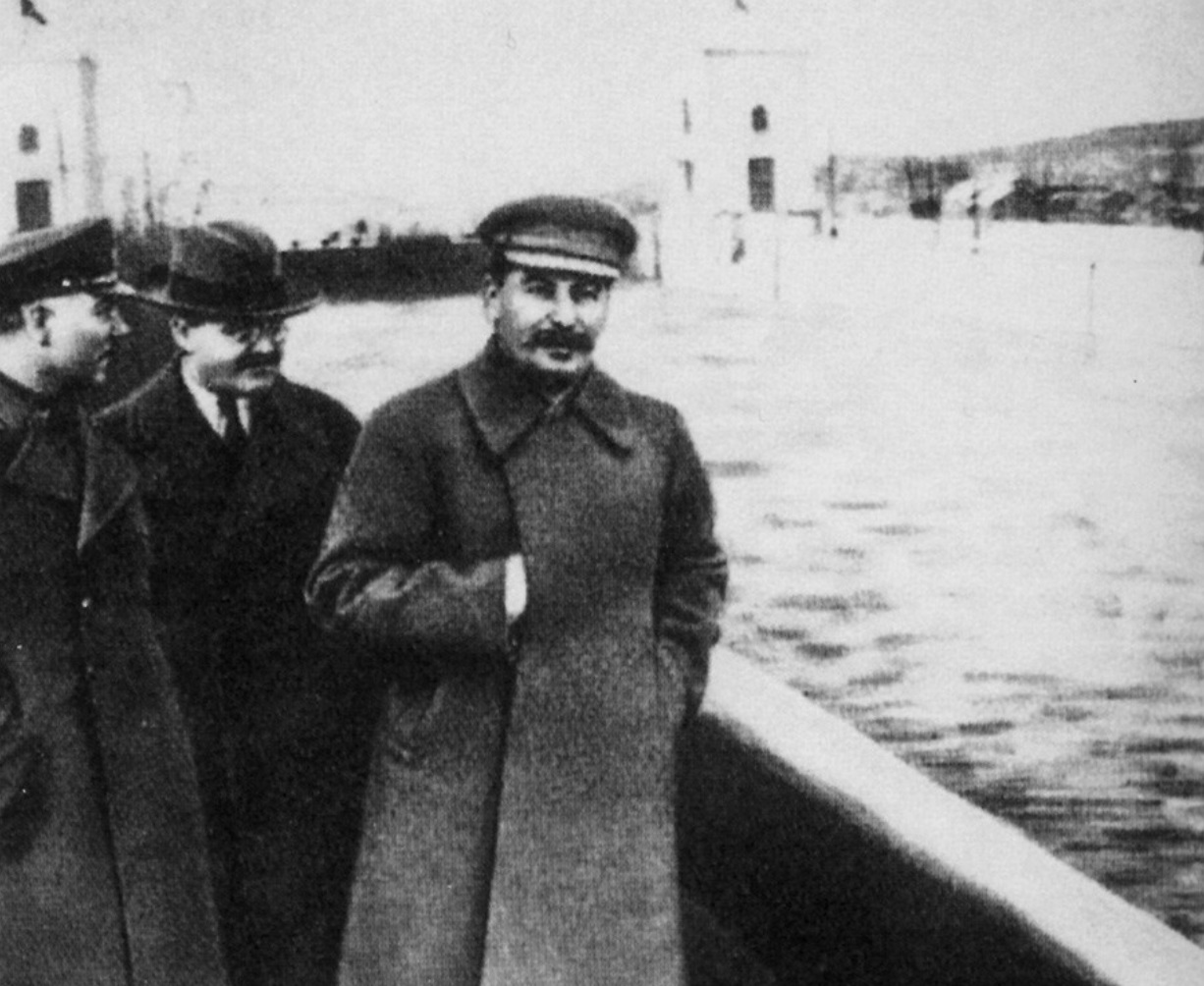
Yezhov was posthumously removed from pictures, such as here where he stood next to Joseph Stalin.

In Russia, Yezhov remains mostly known as the person who was responsible for atrocities of the Great Purge that he conducted on Stalin's orders. Among historians, he also has the nickname "The Vanishing Commissar" because after his execution, his likeness was retouched out of an official press photo; he is among the best-known examples of the Soviet press making someone who had fallen out of favour "disappear".

Yezhov was very short, standing 151 centimetres (4 ft 11 1/2 in), and that, combined with his perceived sadistic personality, led to his nickname "The Poison Dwarf" or "The Bloody Dwarf".

Due to his role in the Great Purge, Yezhov has not been officially rehabilitated by the Soviet and Russian authorities.

== Honors and awards ==
- Order of Lenin
- Order of the Red Banner (Mongolia)
- Badge of "Honorary Security Officer"

A decree of the Presidium of the Supreme Soviet on 24 January 1941 deprived Yezhov of all state and special awards.

== See also ==
- Article 58 (RSFSR Penal Code)
- Outline of the Russian Revolution and Civil War
- Bibliography of the Russian Revolution and Civil War
- Bibliography of Stalinism and the Soviet Union
- Index of Old Bolsheviks
- Index of articles related to the Russian Revolution and Civil War
- Chronology of Soviet secret police agencies
- Everyday Stalinism: Ordinary Life in Extraordinary Times: Soviet Russia in the 1930s
- Stalin: Waiting for Hitler, 1929–1941, the second volume in an extensive three-volume biography of Joseph Stalin
- Stalin's Peasants: Resistance and Survival in the Russian Village after Collectivization

== Bibliography ==
- Nicolaevsky, Boris I. (1975). Power and the Soviet elite: "The letter of an old Bolshevik," and other essays. Ann Arbor, Mich: University of Michigan Press. ISBN 0-472-09196-4.
- Medvedev, Roy Aleksandrovich; Shukman, Harold (7 August 1985). All Stalin's Men. Blackwell Publishers. ISBN 0-631-14187-1.
- Montefiore, Simon Sebag (13 September 2005). Stalin: The Court of the Red Tsar. Vintage. ISBN 1-4000-7678-1.
- Petrov, Nikita; Jansen, Marc (5 April 2002). Stalin's Loyal Executioner: People's Commissar Nikolai Ezhov, 1895-1940 TLE. Hoover Institution Press. ISBN 0-8179-2902-9.
- Getty, J. Arch; Naumov, Oleg V. (2008). Yezhov: The Rise of Stalin's "Iron Fist". Yale University Press. ISBN 978-0-300-09205-9.
- Getty, J. Arch; Naumov, Oleg V. (2010). The Road to Terror: Stalin and the Self-Destruction of the Bolsheviks, 1932-1939 (2nd ed.). New Haven: Yale University Press. ISBN 978-0300104073.
