= German submarine U-655 =

German World War II submarine

Coordinates: 73°00′N 21°00′E

History

Nazi Germany
- Name: U-655
- Ordered: 9 October 1939
- Builder: Howaldtswerke, Hamburg
- Yard number: 804
- Laid down: 10 August 1940
- Launched: 5 June 1941
- Commissioned: 11 August 1941
- Fate: Sunk by ramming on 24 March 1942

General characteristics
- Class & type: Type VIIC submarine
- Displacement: 769 t (757 long tons) surfaced; 871 t (857 long tons) submerged
- Length: 67.10 m (220 ft 2 in) (o/a); 50.50 m (165 ft 8 in) (pressure hull)
- Beam: 6.20 m (20 ft 4 in) (o/a); 4.70 m (15 ft 5 in) (pressure hull)
- Height: 9.60 m (31 ft 6 in)
- Draught: 4.74 m (15 ft 7 in)
- Installed power: 2,800–3,200 PS (2,100–2,400 kW; 2,800–3,200 bhp) (diesels); 750 PS (550 kW; 740 shp) (electric)
- Propulsion: 2 shafts; 2 × diesel engines; 2 × electric motors
- Speed: 17.7 knots (32.8 km/h; 20.4 mph) surfaced; 7.6 knots (14.1 km/h; 8.7 mph) submerged
- Range: 8,500 nmi (15,700 km; 9,800 mi) at 10 knots (19 km/h; 12 mph) surfaced; 80 nmi (150 km; 92 mi) at 4 knots (7.4 km/h; 4.6 mph) submerged
- Test depth: 230 m (750 ft); Crush depth: 250–295 m (820–968 ft)
- Complement: 4 officers, 40–56 enlisted
- Armament: 5 × torpedo tubes (four bow, one stern); 14 × 53.3 cm (21 in) torpedoes or 26 TMA mines; 1 × 8.8 cm (3.46 in) deck gun (220 rounds); 1 x 2 cm (0.79 in) C/30 AA gun

Service record
- Part of: 6th U-boat Flotilla; 11 August 1941 – 24 March 1942
- Identification codes: M 06 051
- Commanders: K.Kapt. Adolf Dumrese; 11 August 1941 – 24 March 1942
- Operations: 1 patrol: 15 – 24 March 1942
- Victories: None

German submarine U-655 was a Type VIIC U-boat of Nazi Germany's Kriegsmarine during World War II. She was the first U-boat sunk in operation against the Arctic convoys.

== Design ==
German Type VIIC submarines were preceded by the shorter Type VIIB submarines. U-655 had a displacement of 769 tonnes (757 long tons) when at the surface and 871 tonnes (857 long tons) while submerged. She had a total length of 67.10 m (220 ft 2 in), a pressure hull length of 50.50 m (165 ft 8 in), a beam of 6.20 m (20 ft 4 in), a height of 9.60 m (31 ft 6 in), and a draught of 4.74 m (15 ft 7 in). The submarine was powered by two Germaniawerft F46 four-stroke, six-cylinder supercharged diesel engines producing a total of 2,800 to 3,200 metric horsepower (2,060 to 2,350 kW; 2,760 to 3,160 shp) for use while surfaced, two Siemens-Schuckert GU 343/38–8 double-acting electric motors producing a total of 750 metric horsepower (550 kW; 740 shp) for use while submerged. She had two shafts and two 1.23 m (4 ft) propellers. The boat was capable of operating at depths of up to 230 metres (750 ft).

The submarine had a maximum surface speed of 17.7 knots (32.8 km/h; 20.4 mph) and a maximum submerged speed of 7.6 knots (14.1 km/h; 8.7 mph). When submerged, the boat could operate for 80 nautical miles (150 km; 92 mi) at 4 knots (7.4 km/h; 4.6 mph); when surfaced, she could travel 8,500 nautical miles (15,700 km; 9,800 mi) at 10 knots (19 km/h; 12 mph). U-655 was fitted with five 53.3 cm (21 in) torpedo tubes (four fitted at the bow and one at the stern), fourteen torpedoes, one 8.8 cm (3.46 in) SK C/35 naval gun, 220 rounds, and a 2 cm (0.79 in) C/30 anti-aircraft gun. The boat had a complement of between forty-four and sixty.

== Service history ==
The submarine was laid down on 10 August 1940 at the Howaldtswerke yard at Hamburg, launched on 5 June 1941.

The submarine was commissioned on 11 August 1941 under the command of Kapitänleutnant Adolf Dumrese (13 Nov 1909 - 24 Mar 1942).

Attached to 6th U-boat Flotilla based at Kiel, U-655 completed her training period on 1 March 1942 and was assigned to front-line service, The submarine left Kiel on 11 March reaching Helgoland on 12 March. From there the submarine departed on the 15 March on her first operational patrol to form part of the Ziethen wolfpack consisting of U-655 plus U-209, U-376 and U-378 operating northwest of Tromso in the Norwegian and Barent seas against the homebound convoy QP 9.

On the evening of 24 March 1942, U-655 was spotted on the surface about 8.25 pm by the leading gunner on the forward four-inch gun of the minesweeper HMS Sharpshooter beam on, about two to three cables (370 to 556 meters) away and about 10 degrees off the minesweeper's starboard bow, with no crew apparently manning the conning tower or deck. Upon being called by the officer of the watch the captain Lieutenant-Commander David Lampen immediately called for emergency full ahead and called 'Stand by to ram'. Sharpshooter had just begun to gather speed when she struck the submarine just behind the conning tower. The submarine turned rolled over due to the impact and bumped along the minesweeper's port side sinking as it disappeared astern and sank stern first south-east of Bear Island, in approximate position 73.00N, 21.00E. No trace of the submarine or her crew of 45 was found except for two lifebuoys and what may have been a canvas dinghy.

== Bibliography ==
- Busch, Rainer; Röll, Hans-Joachim (1999a). German U-boat Commanders of World War II: A Biographical Dictionary. Translated by Brooks, Geoffrey. London, Annapolis, Md: Greenhill Books, Naval Institute Press. ISBN 1-55750-186-6.
- Busch, Rainer; Röll, Hans-Joachim (1999b). Der U-Boot-Krieg, 1939-1945: Deutsche U-Boot-Verluste von September 1939 bis Mai 1945 [German U-boat losses from September 1939 to May 1945] (in German). Vol. IV. Hamburg, Berlin, Bonn: Mittler. ISBN 3-8132-0514-2.
- Gröner, Eric; Jung, Dieter; Maass, Martin (1991). German Warships 1815-1945: U-boats and Mine Warfare Vessels. Vol. 2. Translated by Thomas, Keith; Magowan, Rachel. London: Conway Maritime Press. ISBN 0-85177-593-4.
- Helgason, Guðmundur. "Adolf Dumrese". German U-boats of WWII - uboat.net.
- Helgason, Guðmundur. "The Type VIIC boat U-655". German U-boats of WWII - uboat.net.
- Helgason, Guðmundur. "Patrols by U-655". German U-boats of WWII - uboat.net.
- Paterson, Lawrence (2016). Steel and Ice: The U-Boat Battle in the Arctic and Black Sea 1941-45. Stroud, Gloucestershire: The History Press. ISBN 978-1-59114-258-4.
