= Boris Akazyonok =

Russian navigator and Hero of the Soviet Union (1913–1996)

Boris Ivanovich Akazyonok
- Борис Иванович Аказёнок
- Born: 18 July [O.S. 5 July] 1913
- Died: 23 March 1996 (aged 82)
- Awards: Hero of the Soviet Union

Boris Ivanovich Akazyonok (Russian: Борис Иванович Аказёнок; 18 July [O.S. 5 July] 1913 – 23 March 1996) was a helmsman and anti-aircraft gunner on the ship Stary Bolshevik. For his actions during Convoy PQ 16 he and several other crewmembers of the ship were awarded the title Hero of the Soviet Union.
