= Abol Hassan Ebtehaj =

Iranian banker (1899–1999)

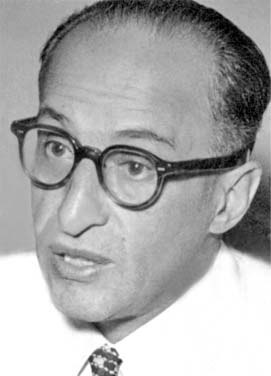

Governor of Bank Melli
- In office 1942–1950

Personal details
- Born: 29 November 1899 Rasht, Iran
- Died: 25 February 1999 (aged 99) London, United Kingdom

Abol Hassan Ebtehaj (1899– 1999) was an Iranian banker and administrator who headed the Bank Melli during the rule of the Shah Mohammad Reza Pahlavi. Ebtehaj was the first technocrat of Iran. Eugene R. Black Sr., former president of the World Bank, reported that he was "one of the most significant Iranians of the post-World War II period ... an outstanding pioneer in Third World development, a nationalist utterly committed to the promotion of his country's interests."

== Early life and education ==
Ebtehaj was born in Rasht on 29 November 1899. His father was a customs official. At age 11 he was sent to the Lycée Montaigne in Paris. Then he continued his studies at the Syrian Protestant College, today American University, in Beirut.

== Career ==
Ebtehaj started his career at the Imperial Bank of Iran in 1920. He became a government inspector for the Agricultural Bank in 1936 and also, worked as an inspector for the state-owned enterprises. He was named as vice-president of Bank Melli, the Persian state bank, in 1940. He was appointed chairman and managing director of the Mortgage Bank. Then he was appointed president of Bank Melli in 1942. He was removed from office by the Prime Minister Haj Ali Razmara in 1950 after the decentralization of the Seven Year Plan.

Next he was appointed ambassador of Iran to France in 1950, but he was removed from the post in 1952. After his diplomatic post, he worked at the International Monetary Fund as the director of the Middle East Department. In 1954 he returned to Iran and was made the chief of the Plan Organization and Budget Office. Under his presidency the Plan Organization would both train and employ young technocratic elites who might be assigned to government posts. Ebtehaj initiated a project to build the Dez Dam in the mid-1955 after his organization lost control over another dam project concerning the Karaj Dam. His term at the Plan Organization and Budget Office ended on 25 February 1959 when he resigned from office due to tensions with Prime Minister Manouchehr Eghbal. He also had disagreements with Shah Mohammad Reza Pahlavi concerning the use of oil income. Ebtehaj argued that it should be used for development projects not for military programs. Eghbal succeeded him as chief of the Plan Organization and Budget Office on 1 March.

Ebtehaj cofounded a private bank named Bank-e Iranian (Persian: Iranians’ Bank) in January 1960 and became its chairman and president.

=== Arrest ===
Ebtehaj criticized the economic policies of Iran on various platforms, including BBC Panorama interview. He was arrested on 11 November 1961 shortly after his return to Iran from a meeting in San Francisco where he also had expressed his critical views. The reason for his arrest was the allegations of corruption related to his tenure as the director of the planning office. He was released from prison in May 1962.

== Personal life, later years and death ==
Ebtehaj married twice, and his second wife was Azar Sani with whom he married in 1956. He had no child from his first marriage. He had a son and a daughter from his second marriage.

After selling his assets in Iran, including Bank-e Iranian, Ebtehaj and his wife left Iran for France in May 1978. In 1984 they moved to London where Ebtehaj bought an apartment near Kensington Gardens. Ebtehaj's memoir was published in Persian in London in 1991. He died in London on 25 February 1999.

=== Legacy ===
Frances Bostock and Geoffrey Jones published a biography of Ebtehaj in 1989 with a special reference his activities at the Planning Organization. The book is entitled Planning and Power in Iran: Ebtehaj and Economic Development under the Shah.
