= Convoy PQ 5 =

- Part of Arctic Convoys of the Second World War
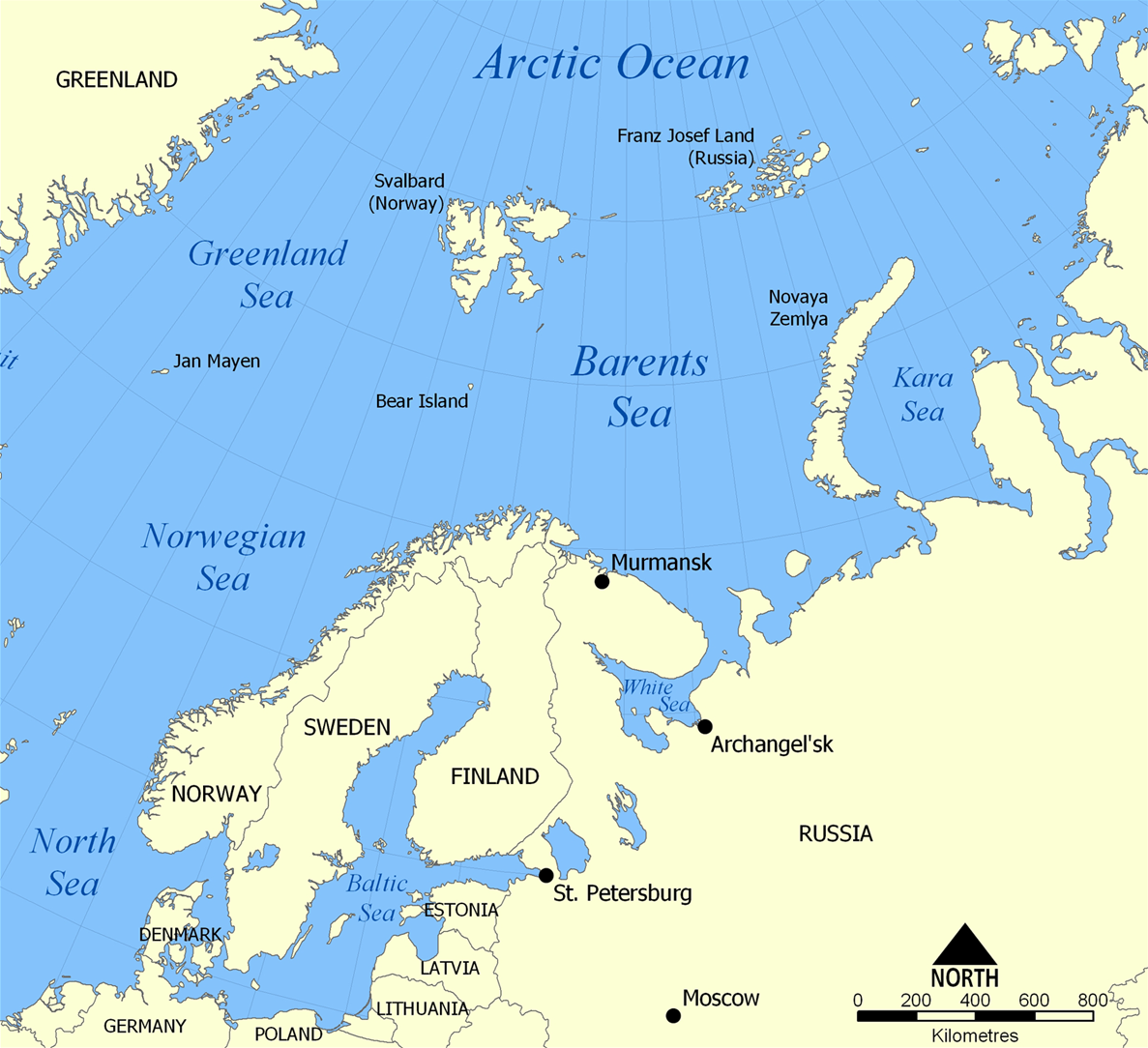
- The Norwegian and the Barents seas, site of the Arctic convoys
Date	27 November – 13 December 1941
Location	Arctic Ocean
Result	British victory

Belligerents
Royal Navy; Merchant Navy; Soviet Union	Kriegsmarine; Luftwaffe

Strength
7 merchant ships; 6 escorts (in relays); 3 destroyers	Kriegsmarine; Luftflotte 5

Casualties and losses
Nil	Nil

Convoy PQ 5 (27 November – 13 December 1941) was the sixth of the Arctic Convoys of the Second World War by which the Western Allies supplied military equipment, weapons and raw materials to the Soviet Union after Operation Barbarossa the German invasion that began on 22 June 1941. The vast majority of the supplies dispatched in 1941 came from British stocks. The convoy sailed from Hvalfjörður in Iceland.

The cruiser HMS Sheffield and Halcyon-class minesweepers escorted the convoy in relays, only HMS Sharpshooter sailing straight through. The destroyers HMS Offa, Onslow and Oribi struggled for six days to find the convoy until they spotted funnel smoke.

The ships were helped through the White Sea Throat Gorlo the strait into the White Sea, 99 mi (160 km) long and 29–58 mi (46–93 km) wide, by Soviet ice breakers, reaching Arkhangelsk. As the winter ice increased, later convoys had to go to Murmansk. The Luftwaffe and the Kriegsmarine had almost no knowledge of the early PQ and the return QP convoys.

== Background ==
=== Arctic Ocean ===
Between Greenland and Norway are some of the most stormy waters of the world's oceans, 890 mi (1,440 km) of water under gales full of snow, sleet and hail. Around the North Cape and the Barents Sea the sea temperature rarely rises about 4° Celsius and a man in the water would probably die unless rescued immediately. The cold water and air made spray freeze on the superstructure of ships, which had to be removed quickly to avoid the ship becoming top-heavy. The cold Arctic water is met by the Gulf Stream, warm water from the Gulf of Mexico, which becomes the North Atlantic Drift. Arriving at the south-west of England, the drift moves between Scotland and Iceland.

North of Norway the drift splits, one stream of the North Atlantic Drift goes north of Bear Island to Svalbard and the southern stream follows the coast of Murmansk into the Barents Sea. The mingling of cold Arctic water and warmer water of higher salinity generates thick banks of fog for convoys to hide in but the waters drastically reduce the effectiveness of Asdic as U-boats moved in waters of differing temperatures and density. The phenomenon is at its most disruptive of submarine detection near the Kola Inlet. In winter, polar ice can form as far south as 50 mi (80 km) of the North Cape forcing ships closer to Luftwaffe air bases or being able to sail further out to sea in summer when the ice can recede northwards as far as Svalbard. The region is in perpetual darkness in winter and permanent daylight in the summer which makes air reconnaissance almost impossible or easy.

=== Arctic convoys ===
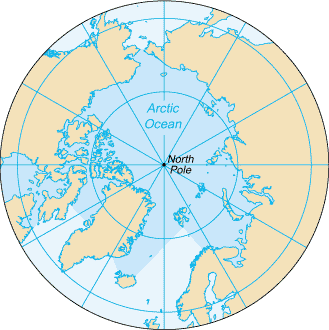
Diagram of the Arctic Ocean

The Soviet authorities had claimed that the unloading capacity of Arkhangelsk was 300,000 long tons (300,000 t), Vladivostok 140,000 long tons (140,000 t) and 60,000 long tons (61,000 t) by the Persian Gulf route. When surveyed by British and US technicians, the capacity of the ten berths at Arkhangelsk was assessed as 90,000 long tons (91,000 t) and the same from Murmansk from its eight berths. By late 1941, the convoy system used in the Atlantic had been established on the Arctic run; a convoy commodore ensured that the ships' masters and signals officers attended a briefing before sailing to make arrangements for the management of the convoy.

The convoy sailed in a formation of long rows of short columns. The commodore was usually a retired naval officer, aboard a ship identified by a white pendant with a blue cross. The commodore was assisted by a Naval signals party of four men, who used lamps, semaphore flags and telescopes to pass signals, coded from books carried in a bag, weighted to be dumped overboard. In large convoys, the commodore was assisted by vice- and rear-commodores to direct the speed, course and zig-zagging of the merchant ships and liaise with the escort commander. (Note: By the end of 1941, 187 Matilda II and 249 Valentine tanks had been delivered, comprising 25 per cent of the medium-heavy tanks in the Red Army, making 30–40 per cent of the medium-heavy tanks defending Moscow. In December 1941, 16 percent of the fighters defending Moscow were Hawker Hurricanes and Curtiss Tomahawks from Britain and by 1 January 1942, 96 Hurricane fighters were flying in the Soviet Air Forces (Voyenno-Vozdushnye Sily, VVS). The British supplied radar apparatus, machine tools, Asdic and commodities.)

=== First Protocol ===
The Soviet leaders needed to replace the colossal losses of military equipment lost after the German invasion, especially when Soviet war industries were being moved out of the war zone and emphasised tank and aircraft deliveries. Machine tools, steel and aluminium was needed to replace indigenous resources lost in the invasion. The pressure on the civilian sector of the economy needed to be limited by food deliveries. The Soviets wanted to concentrate the resources that remained on items that the Soviet war economy that had the greatest comparative advantage over the German economy. Aluminium imports allowed aircraft production to a far greater extent than would have been possible using local sources and tank production was emphasised at the expense of lorries and food supplies were squeezed by reliance on what could be obtained from lend–lease. At the Moscow Conference, it was acknowledged that 1.5 million tons of shipping was needed to transport the supplies of the First Protocol and that Soviet sources could provide less than 10 per cent of the carrying capacity.

The British and Americans accepted that the onus was on them to find most of the shipping, despite their commitments in other theatres. The Prime Minister, Winston Churchill, made a commitment to send a convoy to the Arctic ports of the USSR every ten days and to deliver 1,200 tanks a month from July 1942 to January 1943, followed by 2,000 tanks and another 3,600 aircraft more than already promised. In November, the US president, Franklin D. Roosevelt, ordered Admiral Emory Land of the US Maritime Commission and then the head of the War Shipping Administration that deliveries to Russia should only be limited by 'insurmountable difficulties'. The first convoy was due at Murmansk around 12 October and the next convoy was to depart Iceland on 22 October. A motley of British, Allied and neutral shipping loaded with military stores and raw materials for the Soviet war effort would be assembled at Hvalfjörður in Iceland, convenient for ships from both sides of the Atlantic.

From Operation Dervish to Convoy PQ 11, the supplies to the USSR were mostly British, in British ships defended by the Royal Navy. A fighter force that could defend Murmansk was delivered that protected the Arctic ports and railways into the hinterland. British supplied aircraft and tanks reinforced the Russian defences of Leningrad and Moscow from December 1941. The tanks and aircraft did not save Moscow but were important in the Soviet counter-offensive. The Luftwaffe was by then reduced to 600 operational aircraft on the Eastern Front, to an extent a consequence of Luftflotte 2 being sent to the Mediterranean against the British. Tanks and aircraft supplied by the British helped the Soviet counter-offensive force back the Germans further than might have been possible. In January and February 1941, deliveries of tanks and aircraft allowed the Russians to have a margin of safety should the Germans attempt to counter-attack.

=== Signals intelligence ===
==== Bletchley Park ====
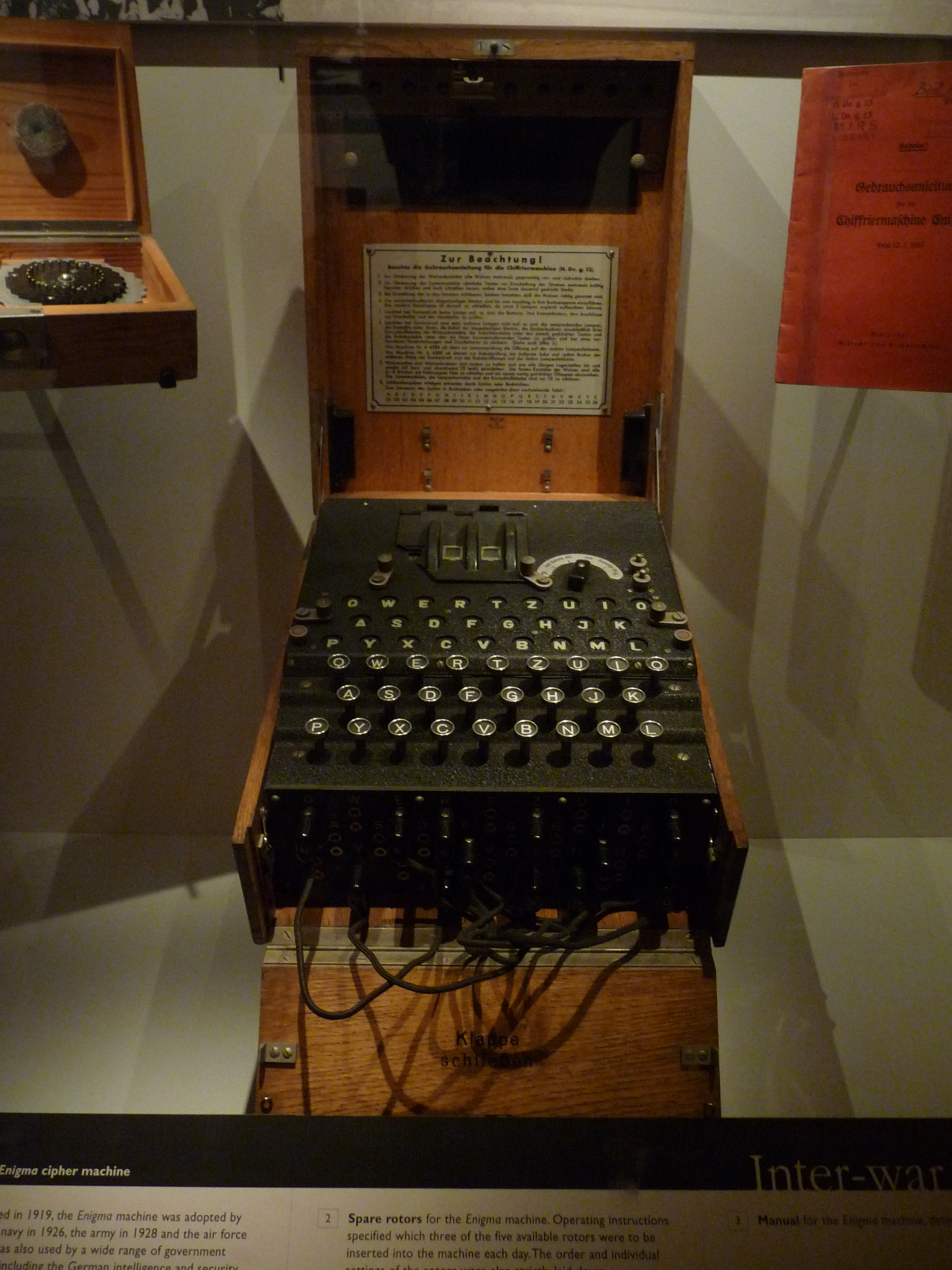
Photograph of a German Enigma coding machine

The British Government Code and Cypher School (GC&CS) based at Bletchley Park housed a small industry of code-breakers and traffic analysts. By June 1941, the German Enigma machine Home Waters (Heimish) settings used by surface ships and U-boats could quickly be read. On 1 February 1942, the Enigma machines used in U-boats in the Atlantic and Mediterranean were changed but German ships and the U-boats in Arctic waters continued with the older Heimish (Hydra from 1942, Dolphin to the British). By mid-1941, British Y-stations were able to receive and read Luftwaffe W/T transmissions and give advance warning of Luftwaffe operations. In 1941, naval Headache personnel, with receivers to eavesdrop on Luftwaffe wireless transmissions, were embarked on warships.

==== B-Dienst ====
The rival German Beobachtungsdienst (B-Dienst, Observation Service) of the Kriegsmarine Marinenachrichtendienst (MND, Naval Intelligence Service) had broken several Admiralty codes and cyphers by 1939, which were used to help Kriegsmarine ships elude British forces and provide opportunities for surprise attacks. From June to August 1940, six British submarines were sunk in the Skaggerak using information gleaned from British wireless signals. In 1941, B-Dienst read signals from the Commander in Chief Western Approaches informing convoys of areas patrolled by U-boats, enabling the submarines to move into "safe" zones.

== Prelude ==
=== Kriegsmarine ===
German naval forces in Norway were commanded by Hermann Böhm, the Kommandierender Admiral Norwegen. Two U-boats were based in Norway in July 1941, four in September, five in December and four due in January 1942. Grand Admiral (Großadmiral) Erich Raeder, head of the Kriegsmarine, proposed a sortie to the Führer, Adolf Hitler, on 13 November but fuel shortage and the fate of Bismarck, led Hitler to veto the suggestion; Admiral Scheer was sent to northern Norway. Raeder withdrew the torpedo boats in the north and replaced them with Type 1934-class destroyers. The destroyers carried a heavy armament of five 5-inch guns and eight torpedo tubes but suffered from unreliable boilers. Raeder ordered Karl Dönitz, the commander of the U-boat arm (Befehlshaber der U-Boote [BdU]) to send U-boats to Norway sufficient to keep three on patrol.

=== Luftflotte 5 ===
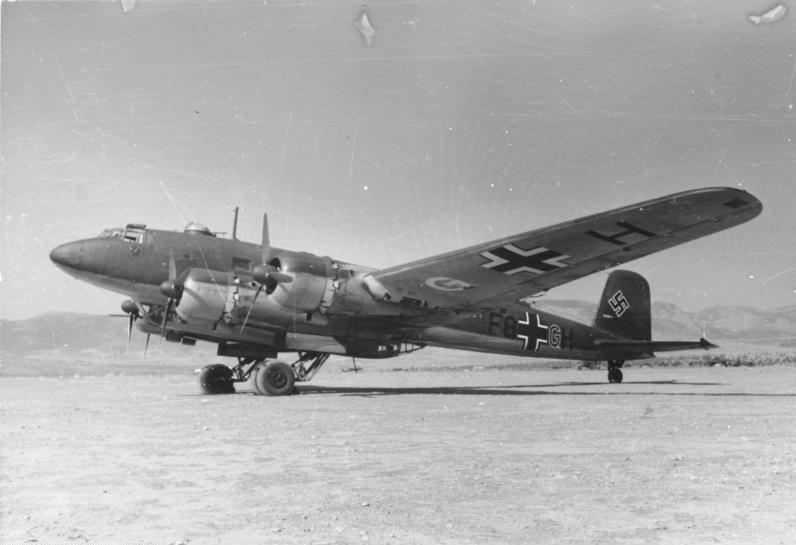
A Focke-Wulf Fw 200 Kondor of KG 40

In mid-1941, Luftflotte 5 (Air Fleet 5) had been re-organised for Operation Barbarossa when Luftgau Norwegen (Air Region Norway) was headquartered in Oslo. Fliegerführer Stavanger (Air Commander Stavanger) the centre and north of Norway, Jagdfliegerführer Norwegen (Fighter Leader Norway) commanded the fighter force and Fliegerführer Kerkenes (Oberst [colonel] Andreas Nielsen) in the far north had airfields at Kirkenes and Banak. The Air Fleet had 180 aircraft, sixty of which were reserved for operations on the Karelian Front against the Red Army.

The distance from Banak to Arkhangelsk was 560 mi (900 km) and Fliegerführer Kerkenes had only ten Junkers Ju 88 bombers of Kampfgeschwader 30, thirty Stukas, ten Messerschmitt Bf 109 fighters of Jagdgeschwader 77, five Messerschmitt Bf 110 heavy fighters of Zerstörergeschwader 76, ten reconnaissance aircraft and an anti-aircraft battalion. Sixty aircraft were far from adequate in such a climate and terrain where "there is no favourable season for operations" (Earl F. Ziemke). The emphasis of air operations changed from army support to anti-shipping operations as Allied Arctic convoys became more frequent.

==== Air-sea rescue ====
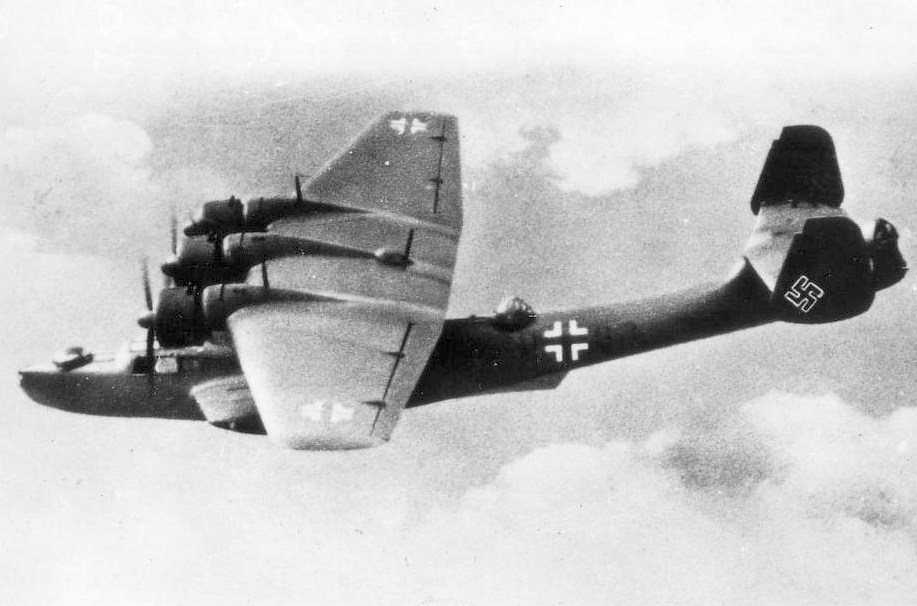
Example of a German Dornier Do 24 seaplane

The Luftwaffe Sea Rescue Service (Seenotdienst) along with the Kriegsmarine, the Norwegian Society for Sea Rescue (RS) and ships on passage, recovered aircrew and shipwrecked sailors. The service comprised Seenotbereich VIII at Stavanger, covering Bergen and Trondheim with Seenotbereich IX at Kirkenes for Tromsø, Billefjord and Kirkenes. Co-operation was as important in rescues as it was in anti-shipping operations, if aircrew were to be saved before they succumbed to the cold and severe weather.

The sea rescue aircraft comprised Heinkel He 59 floatplanes, Dornier Do 18 and Dornier Do 24 seaplanes. Oberkommando der Luftwaffe (OKL, the high command of the Luftwaffe) was not able to increase the number of search and rescue aircraft in Norway, due to a general shortage of aircraft and crews, despite Stumpff pointing out that coming down in such cold waters required extremely swift recovery and that his crews "must be given a chance of rescue" or morale could not be maintained.

== Voyage ==
The convoy consisted of five British ships, SS Briarwood, SS Chulmleigh, SS Empire Stevenson, SS Saint Clears and SS Trehata, with two Russian merchant ships, SS Komiles and SS Petrovski, all of which arrived safely. The close escort comprised five Halcyon-class minesweepers in relays, HMS Hazard, Hebe from 27 November to 7 December with HMS Sheffield, a Town-class cruiser from 1 to 7 December, before detaching to Murmansk with Hazard and Hebe on 7 December. HMS Sharpshooter sailed straight through from 27 November to 13 December and HMS Bramble and Seagull from 7 to 13 December. The destroyers HMS Offa, Onslow and Oribi spent six days searching for the convoy, until its smoke was spotted along the ice-edge, having been supplied with mistaken information by the Home Fleet headquarters. The ships were helped through the White Sea Throat (Gorlo) a strait into the White Sea, 99 mi (160 km) long and 29–58 mi (46–93 km) wide, by Soviet ice breakers, reaching Arkhangelsk on 13 December.

== Aftermath ==
=== Analysis ===
The convoy arrived at the Gorlo where icebreakers kept a passage open until 12 December. The closing of the White Sea by ice meant that subsequent convoys, beginning with Convoy PQ 7 would have to use Murmansk, Admiral Golovko wrote in his diary for 10 December,

Matters are evidently moving in favour of Murmansk becoming the reception point for convoys.

and on 25 December wrote,

The signs are that cargo vessels will sail into Murmansk. Now there is no end to our troubles.

German knowledge of the Arctic convoys was so limited that there were no attacks by the Kriegsmarine or the Luftwaffe from Operation Dervish to Convoy PQ 5, the Kriegsmarine having only five torpedo boats (small destroyers) that were not suited to operations in Arctic waters. Convoy PQ 5 arrived without loss and was part of a run of outbound convoys to Convoy PQ 11 that had little difficulty, apart from the weather, in reaching the Arctic north of the USSR. These convoys delivered 75 ships out of 77, with one early return and one loss to a U-boat.

== Allied order of battle ==
=== Merchant ships ===
Ships convoyed
Name	Year	Flag	GRT	P'n	Notes
SS Briarwood	1930	Merchant Navy	4,019	21	Convoy Commodore
SS Chulmleigh	1938	Merchant Navy	5,445	31	
SS Empire Stevenson	1941	Merchant Navy	6,209	22	
SS Komiles	1932	Soviet Union	3,962	23	
SS Petrovski	1921	Soviet Union	3,771	32	
SS Saint Clears	1936	Merchant Navy	4,312	12	Wintered In North Russia
SS Trehata	1928	Merchant Navy	4,817	11	

=== Convoy formation ===
Order of sailing (Note: Convoys had a standard formation of short columns, number 1 to the left in the direction of travel. Each position in the column was numbered; 11 was the first ship in column 1 and 12 was the second ship in the column; 21 was the first ship in column 2.)
column 1	column 2	column 3
11 Trehata	21 Briarwood	31 Chulmleigh
12 Saint Clears	22 Empire Stevenson	32 Petrovski
13 —	23 Komiles	33 —

=== Escorts ===
Convoy escorts
Name	Flag	Type	Notes
Distant cover
HMS Sheffield	Royal Navy	Town-class cruiser	1–7 December
Hvalfjörður to 7 December
HMS Hazard	Royal Navy	Halcyon-class minesweeper	27 November – 7 December
HMS Hebe	Royal Navy	Halcyon-class minesweeper	27 November – 7 December
Hvalfjörður to Arkhangelsk
HMS Sharpshooter	Royal Navy	Halcyon-class minesweeper	27 November – 13 December
From Arkhangelsk
HMS Bramble	Royal Navy	Halcyon-class minesweeper	7–13 December
HMS Seagull	Royal Navy	Halcyon-class minesweeper	7–13 December
Destroyers
HMS Offa	Royal Navy	O-class destroyer	
HMS Onslow	Royal Navy	O-class destroyer	
HMS Oribi	Royal Navy	O-class destroyer	

== Bibliography ==
- Boog, H.; Rahn, W.; Stumpf, R.; Wegner, B. (2001). The Global War: Widening of the Conflict into a World War and the Shift of the Initiative 1941–1943. Germany in the Second World War. Vol. VI. Translated by Osers, E.; Brownjohn, J.; Crampton, P.; Willmot, L. (Eng trans. Oxford University Press, London ed.). Potsdam: Militärgeschichtliches Forschungsamt (Research Institute for Military History). ISBN 0-19-822888-0.
  - Rahn, W. "Part III The War at Sea in the Atlantic and in the Arctic Ocean. III. The Conduct of the War in the Atlantic and the Coastal Area (b) The Third Phase, April–December 1941: The Extension of the Areas of Operations". In Boog et al. (2001).
- Boyd, Andrew (2024). Arms for Russia & the Naval War in the Arctic 1941–1945. Barnsley: Seaforth (Pen & Sword). ISBN 978-1-3990-3886-7.
- Claasen, A. R. A. (2001). Hitler's Northern War: The Luftwaffe's Ill-fated Campaign, 1940–1945. Lawrence, KS: University Press of Kansas. ISBN 0-7006-1050-2.
- Edgerton, D. (2011). Britain's War Machine: Weapons, Resources and Experts in the Second World War. London: Allen Lane. ISBN 978-0-7139-9918-1.
- Hinsley, F. H. (1994) [1993]. British Intelligence in the Second World War: Its Influence on Strategy and Operations (abridged edition). History of the Second World War (2nd rev. ed.). London: HMSO. ISBN 978-0-11-630961-7.
- Howard, M. (1972). Grand Strategy: August 1942 – September 1943. History of the Second World War United Kingdom Military Series. Vol. IV. London: HMSO. ISBN 978-0-11-630075-1.
- Jordan, Roger W. (2006) [1999]. The World's Merchant Fleets 1939: The Particulars and Wartime Fates of 6,000 Ships (2nd ed.). London: Chatham/Lionel Leventhal. ISBN 978-1-86176-293-1.
- Kahn, D. (1973) [1967]. The Codebreakers: The Story of Secret Writing (10th abr. Signet, Chicago ed.). New York: Macmillan. LCCN 63-16109. OCLC 78083316.
- Kemp, Paul (1993). Convoy! Drama in Arctic Waters. London: Arms and Armour Press. ISBN 1-85409-130-1 – via Archive Foundation.
- Macksey, Kenneth (2004) [2003]. The Searchers: Radio Intercept in two World Wars (Cassell Military Paperbacks ed.). London: Cassell. ISBN 978-0-304-36651-4.
- Mitchell, W. H.; Sawyer, L. A. (1990). The Empire Ships (2nd ed.). London, New York, Hamburg, Hong Kong: Lloyd's of London Press Ltd. ISBN 1-85044-275-4.
- Ruegg, R.; Hague, A. (1993) [1992]. Convoys to Russia: Allied Convoys and Naval Surface Operations in Arctic Waters 1941–1945 (2nd rev. enl. ed.). Kendal: World Ship Society. ISBN 0-905617-66-5.
- Woodman, Richard (1994). Arctic Convoys 1941–1945 (hbk. ed.). London: John Murray. ISBN 0-7195-5079-3.
- Woodman, Richard (2004) [1994]. Arctic Convoys 1941–1945. London: John Murray. ISBN 978-0-7195-5752-1.
- Ziemke, Earl F. (1959). The German Northern Theatre of Operations 1940–1945. Department of the Army pamphlets (20-271). Washington, DC: Department of the Army. OCLC 467919261.
