= Sukhanovo Prison =

Monastery and Soviet prison in Vidnoye, Moscow Oblast, Russia

Coordinates: 55.5366°N 37.6661°E

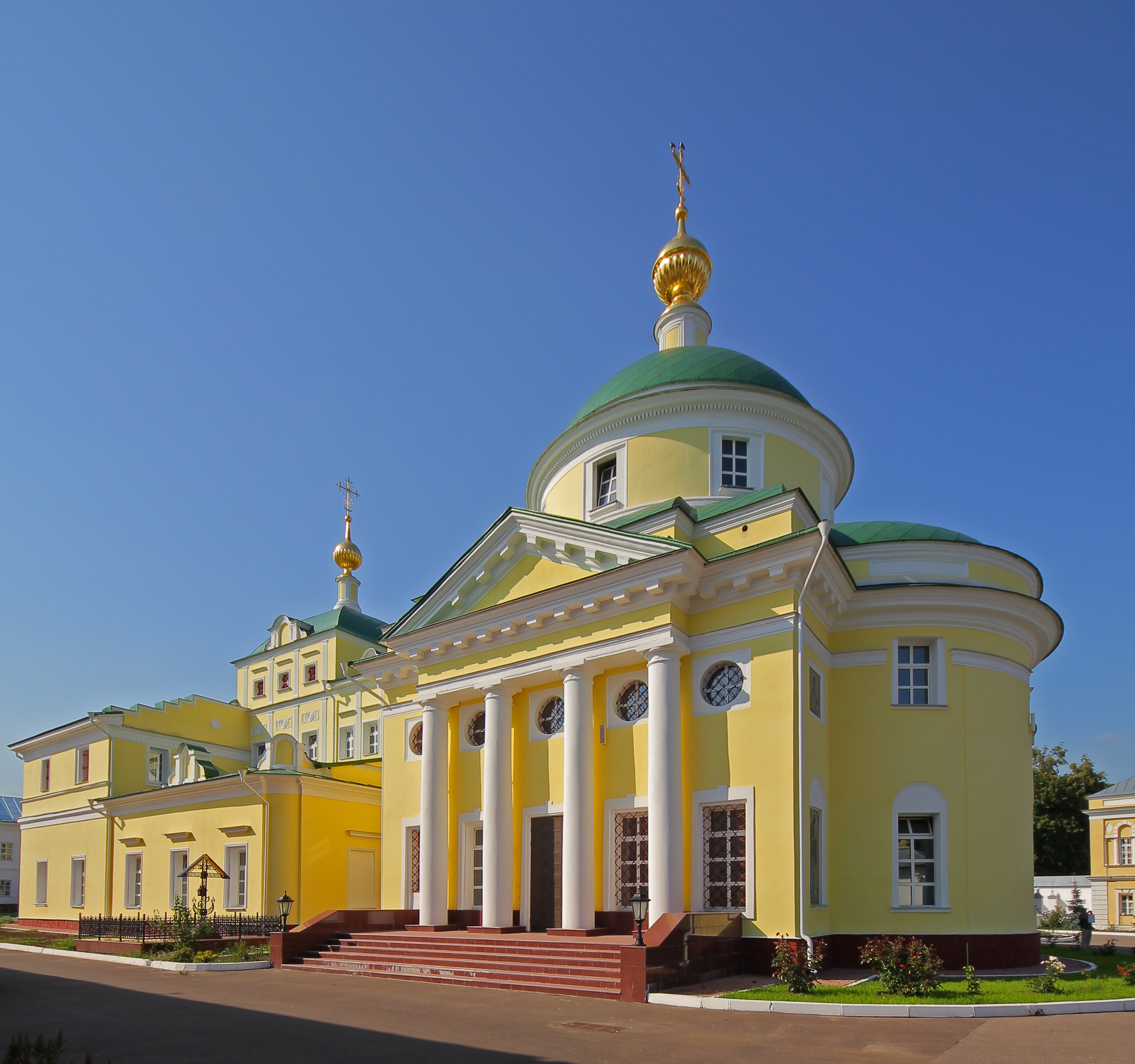
St. Catherine's Monastery in Vidnoye (2011), former buildings of the Sukhanovka prison

Sukhanovka, short for Sukhanovskaya osoborezhimnaya tyur'ma (Russian: Сухановская особорежимная тюрьма) 'Sukhanovo special-regime prison,' was a prison established by the NKVD under N. I. Yezhov in 1938 for "particularly dangerous enemies of the people" on the grounds of the old Ekaterinskaia Pustyn' Monastery near Vidnoye, just south of Moscow. Known officially as Special Object 110 (Russian: Спецобъект № 110), it was said to be worse than the Lubyanka, Lefortovo, or Butyrka prisons in Moscow itself. From 1958 it was a jail hospital. During 1992 the prison was returned to the church as a monastery and on November 17, 1992, the first vows were made within its walls.

== Conditions ==
Aleksandr Solzhenitsyn called it "the most terrible prison the MGB had." He went on to write that interrogators used the mere threat of being sent there to intimidate prisoners, and there was no way to question those who had been there as they either had been driven mad or were dead. He described the prison as comprising two buildings: one in which the prisoners were housed and the other containing 68 monastic cells where interrogations took place. The food was said to be the best of all the political prisons since the food was brought over from the nearby Architects' Rest Home, but the food ration for one architect in the home was divided among twelve prisoners and the prisoners were frequently tortured, deprived of sleep and kept in solitary confinement, including in small, closet-like cells where they could not sit down or move; they were also left in hot and cold rooms to sweat or freeze, and were not allowed exercise outdoors.

== Prisoners ==
NKVD head N. I. Yezhov was imprisoned in Sukhanovka beginning on 10 April 1939 and was interrogated there by the Main Military Procurator, N. P. Afanasyev. His trial took place in the office of the chief of the prison in February 1940, although he was executed in Moscow, on Varsonofevskii Lane, not far from the Lubyanka prison. Yezhov's long-time colleague Filipp Goloshchyokin was also held under "heavy interrogation" in Sukhanovka for a period of 12 months until he was transferred back to Butyrka, and subsequently to Kuibyshev where he was shot in October 1941.

Solzhenitsyn wrote that Deputy Minister of State Security M. D. Ryumin used to personally beat and otherwise torture prisoners in a spacious office at the prison, making certain to cover the nice Persian carpet with a cloth so as not to spatter it with the prisoners' blood.

Alexander Dolgun, a Polish-American worker imprisoned in the Gulag in the late 1940s, was sent to Sukhanovka twice, and is one of the few known to have survived the experience without losing his mind.
