= People's Commissariat for Water Transport =

Soviet government ministry (1931–39)

- Народный комиссариат водного транспорта Narodny Komissariat Vodnogo Transporta
- All Soviet department seals used the USSR coat of arms (the 1936–1946 version is showed)

- Soviet state and civil ensign (1936–1955)

People's Commissariat overview
- Formed: January 30, 1931
- Preceding People's Commissariat: People's Commissariat of Transportation
- Dissolved: April 9, 1939
- Superseding agencies: People's Commissariat of the Maritime Fleet; People's Commissariat of the River Fleet
- Jurisdiction: Council of People's Commissars

The People's Commissariat for Water Transport (Russian: Народный комиссариат водного транспорта, romanized: Narodny Komissariat Vodnogo Transporta), usually abbreviated Narkomvodtrans (Наркомводтранс) or Narkomvod (Наркомвод) and also sometimes NKVT, was the Soviet People's Commissariat for water transport. It was responsible, amongst other things, for running the Soviet merchant maritime fleet.

== History ==
Narkomvod was established on January 30, 1931, in the middle of a re-evaluation of Soviet policy about the railways and the splitting off the People's Commissariat of Transportation and as part of an overall government reorganization. The first people's commissar for Narkomvod was Nikolay Mikhaylovich Ianson, who had formerly been a people's commissar in the Russian Socialist Federative Soviet Republic.

By April 1931, Narkomvod had five directorates, for operations in the Baltic, Northern, Black, Azov, and Caspian Seas. Ianson resigned on March 13, 1934, in order to become the deputy chief of Glavsevmorput. He was replaced by Nikolay Pakhomov.

On April 9, 1939, the People's Commissariat was abolished and split into the People's Commissariat of the River Fleet and the People's Commissariat of the Maritime Fleet.

== Commissars ==
The head of the People's Commissariat was a People's Commissar. The following People's Commissars of Water Transport were appointed:

- 1931–1934 Nikolay Mikhaylovich Ianson (Nikolai Janson, Nikolay Yanson), demoted on March 13, 1934, arrested in 1937, tried and executed shortly thereafter.
- 1934–1938 Nikolay Ivanovich Pakhomov, fired on April 8, 1938, arrested on the next day, tried and executed shortly thereafter.
- 1938–1939 Nikolay Ivanovich Yezhov, also serving as the People's Commissar of Internal Affairs until December 9, 1938. On 9 April 1939 the People's Commissariat for Water Transport was abolished. Yezhov was arrested the following day, then tried and executed within a year of his arrest.
