= Operation FB =

Sailings by unescorted merchant ships during WWII

- Part of The Arctic Convoys of the Second World War
- Iceland, western start and terminus of reciprocal sailings to and from Murmansk
| Date | 29 October to 9 November 1942 |
| Location | Arctic Ocean |
| Result | Inconclusive |

Belligerents
| United Kingdom; United States; Soviet Union | Germany |

Commanders and leaders
| John Tovey; Arseniy Golovko | Erich Raeder |

Units involved
| Royal Navy; Merchant Navy; Royal Air Force; Soviet Navy; Soviet Air Forces | Luftwaffe; Kriegsmarine |

Strength
| Eastbound: 13 merchant ships escorts (west): 4 ASW trawlers escorts (east): 3 trawlers | |

Casualties and losses
| Sunk: 5 Wrecked: 1 Recalled: 3 | |
- 23 Soviet independent sailings 29 October 1942 – 24 January 1943, 1 sunk

Operation FB (29 October – 9 November 1942) took place as part of the Arctic Convoys of the Second World War. The operation consisted of independent sailings by unescorted merchant ships between Iceland and Murmansk. In late 1942, the Allies had taken the offensive against Germany but the dispatch of supplies to the USSR by convoy via the Arctic route was suspended, due to the demands of the Mediterranean campaign. Convoy PQ 19 was cancelled because the Home Fleet diverted ships to the Mediterranean for Operation Torch (8–16 November 1942) which would have had to be postponed for three weeks had ships been provided for Convoy PQ 19.

Discussions between the British Prime Minister Winston Churchill and the US President Franklin D. Roosevelt led to ships being dispatched independently to Russia from Iceland as a substitute for Convoy PQ 19, using the polar night of the Arctic winter for concealment. The ships sailed at approximately twelve-hour intervals, with seven trawlers strung out along the routes as rescue ships. Of thirteen sailings to Russia, three were ordered to turn back and five arrived; of 23 independent departures from the USSR, 22 ships reached their destination. The new outbound convoy series JW, began with Convoy JW 51A (15–25 December 1942), returns being called RW.

== Background ==
=== Arctic convoys ===
In October 1941, after Operation Barbarossa, the German invasion of the USSR, which had begun on 22 June, the Prime Minister, Winston Churchill, made a commitment to send a convoy to the Arctic ports of the USSR every ten days and to deliver 1,200 tanks a month from July 1942 to January 1943, followed by 2,000 tanks and another 3,600 aircraft more than those already promised. The first convoy was due at Murmansk around 12 October and the next convoy was to depart Iceland on 22 October. A motley of British, Allied and neutral shipping loaded with military stores and raw materials for the Soviet war effort would be assembled at Hvalfjordur, Iceland, convenient for ships from both sides of the Atlantic. (Note: By the end of 1941, 187 Matilda II and 249 Valentine tanks had been delivered, comprising 25 per cent of the medium-heavy tanks in the Red Army and 30–40 per cent of the medium-heavy tanks defending Moscow. In December 1941, 16 per cent of the fighters defending Moscow were Hawker Hurricanes and Curtiss Tomahawks from Britain and by 1 January 1942, 96 Hurricane fighters were flying in the Soviet Air Forces (Voyenno-Vozdushnye Sily, VVS). The British supplied radar apparatus, machine tools, Asdic and other commodities.)

By late 1941, the convoy system used in the Atlantic had been established on the Arctic run; a convoy commodore ensured that the ships' masters and signals officers attended a briefing before sailing to make arrangements for the management of the convoy, which sailed in a formation of long rows of short columns. The commodore was usually a retired naval officer, aboard a ship identified by a white pendant with a blue cross. The commodore was assisted by a Naval signals party of four men, who used lamps, semaphore flags and telescopes to pass signals, coded from books carried in a bag, weighted to be dumped overboard. In large convoys, the commodore was assisted by vice- and rear-commodores who directed the speed, course and zig-zagging of the merchant ships and liaised with the escort commander.

Due to the losses of Convoy PQ 18 (2–21 September) in the Arctic and Operation Torch (8–16 November) in the Mediterranean, for which more than 500 ships had to be escorted, much of the British Home Fleet was sent south. The United States and Britain suspended Arctic Convoys to the Soviet Union for the autumn. The US president Franklin D. Roosevelt had favoured sending Convoy PQ 19 but the British had replied that it would delay Torch for three weeks. Roosevelt suggested sending three smaller convoys with fewer escorts but Winston Churchill called this unrealistic. Soviet forces were fighting the Battle of Stalingrad (23 August 1942 – 2 February 1943) on the Eastern Front and the hiatus was much resented by the Soviet leadership, which judged British reasons for the cessation of Arctic convoys to be specious. the British claimed that the ceaseless Home Fleet operations amounted to a ratio of warships to convoyed merchant ships of nearly 1:1 on the Arctic run and that the British contribution to the Red Army in tanks and aircraft far exceeded that of the US.

=== Signals intelligence ===
==== Bletchley Park ====
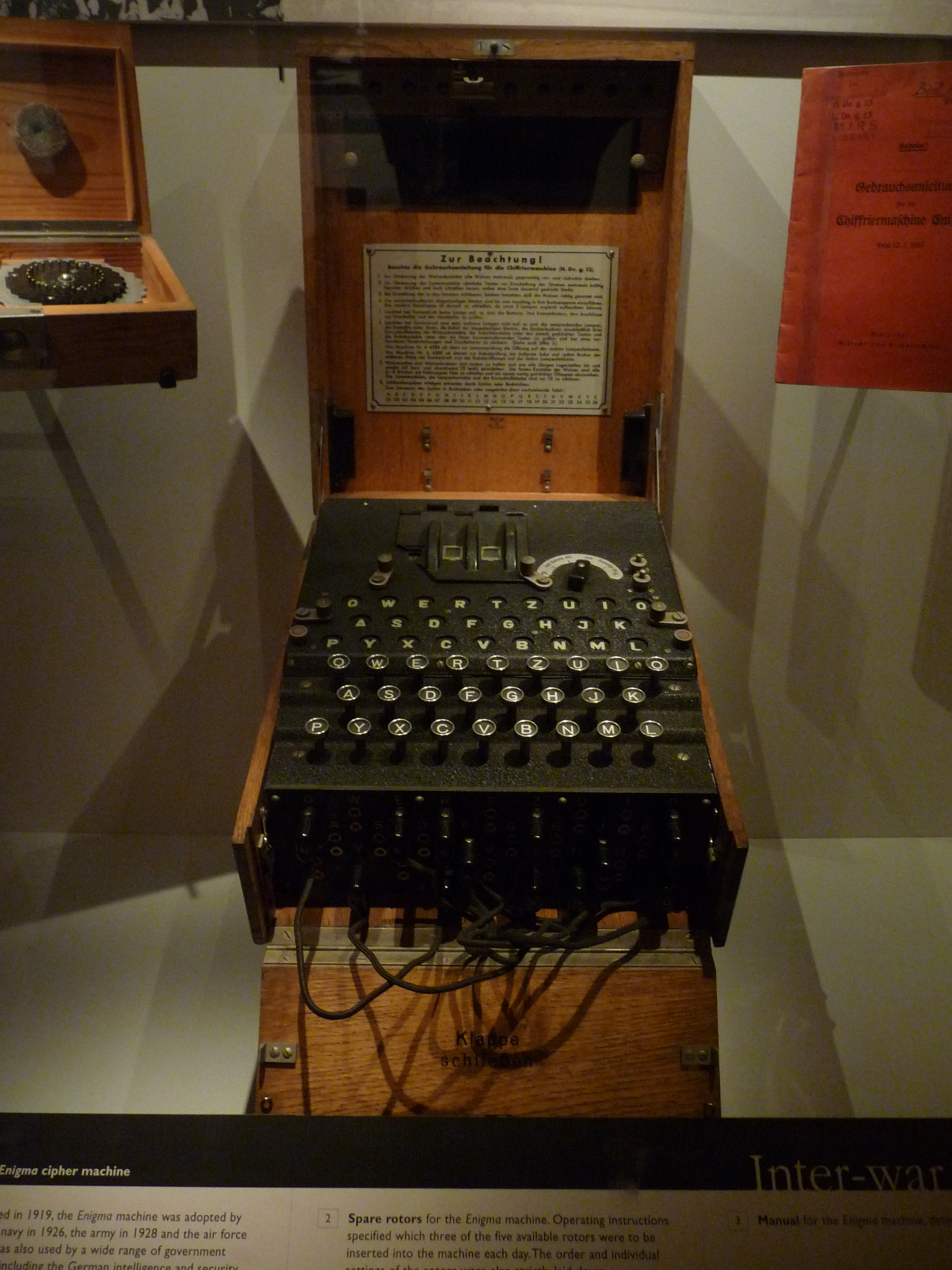
Photograph of a German Enigma coding machine

The British Government Code and Cypher School (GC&CS) based at Bletchley Park housed a small industry of code-breakers and traffic analysts. By June 1941, the German Enigma machine Home Waters (Heimish) settings used by surface ships and U-boats could quickly be read. On 1 February 1942, the Enigma machines used in U-boats in the Atlantic and Mediterranean were changed but German ships and the U-boats in Arctic waters continued with the older Heimish (Hydra from 1942, Dolphin to the British). By mid-1941, British Y-stations were able to receive and read Luftwaffe W/T transmissions and give advance warning of Luftwaffe operations.

In 1941, naval Headache personnel with receivers to eavesdrop on Luftwaffe wireless transmissions were embarked on warships and from May 1942, ships gained RAF Y computor parties, which sailed with cruiser admirals in command of convoy escorts, to interpret Luftwaffe W/T signals intercepted by the Headaches. The Admiralty sent details of Luftwaffe wireless frequencies, call signs and the daily local codes to the computors, which combined with their knowledge of Luftwaffe procedures, could glean fairly accurate details of German reconnaissance sorties. Sometimes computors predicted attacks twenty minutes before they were detected by radar.

==== B-Dienst ====
The rival German Beobachtungsdienst (B-Dienst, Observation Service) of the Kriegsmarine Marinenachrichtendienst (MND, Naval Intelligence Service) had broken several Admiralty codes and cyphers by 1939, which were used to help Kriegsmarine ships elude British forces and provide opportunities for surprise attacks. From June to August 1940, six British submarines were sunk in the Skaggerak using information gleaned from British wireless signals. In 1941, B-Dienst read signals from the Commander in Chief Western Approaches informing convoys of areas patrolled by U-boats, enabling the submarines to move into "safe" zones. B-Dienst had broken Naval Cypher No 3 in February 1942 and by March was reading up to 80 per cent of the traffic, which continued until 15 December 1943. By coincidence, the British lost access to the Shark cypher and had no information to send in Cypher No 3 which might compromise Ultra. In early September, Finnish Radio Intelligence deciphered a Soviet Air Force transmission which divulged the convoy itinerary and forwarded it to the Germans.

== Prelude ==
=== Convoy hiatus ===
Bear island (Bjornoya) south of Spitzbergen (Svalbard)

In the Arctic autumn, the hours of daylight diminished until by midwinter there was only twilight at noon, conditions in which convoys had the best chance of evading German aircraft, ships and U-boats. The surviving ships of Convoy PQ 18 (2–21 September 1942) were still in Soviet ports, unloaded and waiting to return. Forty ships were ready to sail to the USSR in Convoy PQ 19 but this convoy operation had suspended by the British, to the dismay of the US and the anger of the USSR. The suggestion that some ships should sail independently in the meantime, gained favour and a British ship owner, J. A. Bilmeir, offered cash bonuses in advance of £100 each for officers and £50 per rating for volunteers. The Russians had also asked that two Soviet ships at anchor in Iceland be sent back independently to Archangel.

Frederich Engels sailed on 11 August and Belomorkanal (2,920 GRT) followed next day, both reaching Archangel, which increased optimism at the Admiralty, that the slower merchant ships that had been part of PQ 19 could emulate the feat in the lengthening Arctic nights. Churchill assured Roosevelt that any ships sent would be British with volunteer crews but this was not true. On 13 October, the cruiser HMS Argonaut with destroyers HMS Intrepid and Obdurate sailed for Archangel with a medical unit equipped for men suffering from wounds and exposure; Luftwaffe reconnaissance aircraft spotted the ships but they were not attacked. On return the ships carried the aircrew and ground staff of the two Hampden torpedo-bomber squadrons based in Russia during Operation Orator in September.

=== Luftwaffe and Kriegsmarine ===
From 24 to 28 September, the cruiser Admiral Hipper (Captain Hans Hartmann) and five destroyers conducted Operation Zarin, a sortie to mine the west coast of Novaya Zemlya. On 5 November, Admiral Hipper sailed again with the 5th Destroyer Flotilla comprising Z29, Z30, Friedrich Eckoldt and Richard Beitzen, after receiving information from aircraft and U-boats, that individual Allied ships were running the gauntlet through the Barents Sea. The Germans had intended to exploit the absence of much of the Home Fleet to attack convoys with Admiral Hipper but the weather was too bad for its escorting destroyers and an operation against Convoy QP 15 was cancelled. In November, Luftflotte 5, the German air command in Norway and Finland, was ordered to transfer its Junkers Ju 88 and Heinkel He 111 bombers and torpedo-bombers to the Mediterranean against Operation Torch, a decision which the British learned of through Ultra intercepts. Only the Heinkel 115 floatplanes, suitable for torpedo attacks on stragglers, with some Junkers Ju 87 dive-bombers were left in Norway, along with a few long-range reconnaissance aircraft to observe for the surface and U-boat forces.

== Operation FB ==
=== 29 October – 2 November ===
FB sailings 29 October – 2 November 1942
| USSR | To | From |
|---|---|---|
| Sailed | 13 | 23 |
| Turned back | 3 | nil |
| Sunk | 4 | 1 |
| Wrecks | 1 | nil |
| Arrived | 5 | 22 |

SS Richard H. Alvey and Empire Galliard sailed on 29 October, departing from Iceland at roughly twelve-hour [200 nmi (370 km; 230 mi)] intervals, British and American merchantmen making alternate sailings, along with the Soviet vessel Dekabrist, that sailed with SS John Walker and Empire Gilbert on 20 October. SS John H. B. Latrobe, and Chulmleigh sailed on 31 October, SS Hugh Williamson and Empire Sky on 1 November. SS William Clark and Empire Scott sailed on 2 November followed by Daldorch on 3 November and Briarwood on 4 November. The ships took different routes and had the protection of submarine patrols north of Bear Island. The anti-submarine trawlers HMT Cape Palliser, HMT Northern Pride and HMT Northern Spray departed from the Clyde on 23 October for Reykjavík, arriving on 28 October to take on supplies then move to Hvalfjörður (Hvalfjord) to coal during the night, completing at 6:00 a.m. on 29 October. With HMT St Elstan, they formed a line along the route from Iceland to Murmansk from whence, HMT Cape Argona, HMT Cape Mariato and HMT St Kenan sailed to provide the eastern continuation of the line. Northern Spray attacked a U-boat and with a rare Catalina reconnaissance along the track to be followed by the ships, German suspicions were aroused. The British SS Briarwood and SS Daldorch and the US SS John H. B. Latrobe were recalled as a precaution.

=== 2 November 1942 – 24 January 1943 ===
Map of Iceland

On 2 November, Empire Gilbert was sunk by U-586 (Kapitänleutnant Dietrich von der Esch) off Iceland. On 4 November, reconnaissance aircraft of Küstenfliegergruppe 406 began to spot ships. Ju 88s of I/KG 30 summoned to the scene, bombed and sank the Soviet ship Dekabrist; II/KG 30 damaged SS Chulmleigh and William Clark, which was finished off by U-354 (Kapitänleutnant Karl-Heinz Herbschleb) later that day. On 5 November, a Catalina north of Iceland spotted and sank U-408 (Korvettenkapitän Reinhard von Hymmen). Chulmleigh went aground on the Sørkapp (South Cape) of Spitzbergen, the main island of Svalbard; unable to refloat and disabled by the bombing, it was abandoned and then torpedoed by U-625 on 16 November. The crew suffered a six-week ordeal on Spitzbergen before the survivors were rescued by the Free Norwegian occupation force. On 6 November, U-625 (Oberleutnant zur See Hans Benker) sank SS Empire Sky, which was lost with all hands.

=== Operation Hoffnung ===
On 5 November, the heavy cruiser Admiral Hipper (Captain Hans Hartmann, the Commander Cruisers (Befehlshaber der Kreuzer, BdK, Vice-Admiral Oskar Kummetz embarked) with the 5th Destroyer Flotilla (Captain Alfred Schemmel) comprising Z27, Z30, Friedrich Eckoldt and Richard Breitzen sailed to intercept the independents. Kampfgeschwader 30 flew reconnaissance sorties. On 7 November the spotter aircraft of Admiral Hipper found the Soviet tanker Donbass that was sunk by Z27, along with the auxiliary escort ship BO-78 (Musson).

=== Convoy QP 15 ===
Convoy QP 15 (convoy commodore, Captain W. C. Meek) was a return convoy of thirty empty merchant ships from the USSR and was the last of the QP series. The convoy sailed from Archangel on 17 November with 14 US, 8 British, 7 Soviet, a Panamanian-regstered merchant ship and the Convoy rescue ship Copeland. One US ship failed to set out and another ran aground, both being too late to catch up; the rescue ship Rathlin was also left behind with a damaged rudder. The convoy had a local escort of four minesweepers and the close escort comprised a minesweeper and four corvettes; the Soviet destroyers Baku and Sokrushitelny accompanied until 20 November. Four British destroyers from Kola accompanying the convoy detached on 26 November with fuel shortage. Two British cruisers and three destroyers took station west of Bear Island and four submarines were sent to patrol near Altenfjord to deter surface raiders. The convoy could still be routed north of Bear Island and signals intelligence had revealed the transfer of the bombers and torpedo-bombers of Luftflotte V to the Mediterranean.

On 20 November, a gale blew up and scattered the convoy in the seasonal perpetual darkness. Baku was badly damaged in the storm but managed to limp back to port; a large wave hit Sokrushitelny and ripped off the stern. Luftwaffe reconnaissance aircraft were grounded and Kriegsmarine ships stayed in port, as the British had hoped when planning the convoy. Three Soviet destroyers were sent to assist Baku and managed to rescue 187 crew from Sokrushitelny but were not able to save the ship, which sank on 22 November. Neither of the two British groups of reinforcing destroyers found the convoy, which, west of Bear Island, had fragmented. On 23 November, U-625 torpedoed and sank the British freighter Goolistan and later in the day, U-601 sank the Soviet freighter Kuznets Lesov; both ships were lost with all hands. The rest of the merchant ships were reassembled in two groups and arrived in Loch Ewe in the north of Scotland on 30 November and 3 December.

== Aftermath ==
=== Analysis ===
Three ships for north Russia were ordered to turn back after a U-boat sighting, four were sunk, one was wrecked and five arrived safely. On the return journey, 23 ships sailed for Iceland, one was sunk and 22 arrived. In 1956, the British naval official historian, Stephen Roskill, wrote that,

These independent sailings were more successful than some people had expected.

The tactic of independent voyages resembled the "patrol and independent sailings" of the First World War, which in 2004, Richard Woodman called an "absurd expedient" that was "quite useless". A similar initiative in early 1943 by the Soviet authorities for ships independently to make the westward journey, suffered one loss from 23 sailings. Convoy QP 15, the last of the PQ–QP convoys had departed Archangel on 17 November and arrived at Loch Ewe on 30 November. Subsequent convoys were given the codes JW for convoys to the USSR and RA for the return journey.

== Ships ==
=== Iceland to USSR ===
Independent sailings, 1942
| Name | Year | Flag | GRT | Notes |
|---|---|---|---|---|
| SS Briarwood | 1930 | United Kingdom | 4,019 | 4 November, turned back |
| SS Daldorch | 1930 | United Kingdom | 5,571 | 3 November, turned back |
| SS John H. B. Latrobe | 1942 | United States | 7,176 | 31 October, turned back |
| SS Empire Gilbert | 1941 | United Kingdom | 6,640 | 30 October, sunk by U-586 |
| Dekabrist | 1903 | Soviet Union | 7,363 | 30 October, sunk by I/KG 30 4 November |
| SS William Clark | 1942 | United States | 7,167 | 2 November, bombed II/KG 30, sunk by U-354 |
| SS Empire Sky | 1941 | United Kingdom | 7,445 | 1 November, sunk by U-625 |
| SS Chulmleigh | 1938 | United Kingdom | 5,445 | 31 October, stranded Spitzbergen, bombed II/KG 30; U-625 16 November |
| SS John Walker | 1942 | United States | 7,176 | 30 October |
| SS Richard H. Alvey | 1942 | United States | 7,176 | 29 October |
| SS Hugh Williamson | 1942 | United States | 7,176 | 1 November |
| SS Empire Scott | 1941 | United Kingdom | 6,150 | 2 November |
| SS Empire Galliard | 1942 | United Kingdom | 7,170 | 29 October |

== Soviet sailings ==
Russian sailings 29 October 1942 – 24 January 1943
| Name | Year | Flag | GRT | Notes |
|---|---|---|---|---|
| SS Aldan | 1912 | Soviet Union | 2,161 | |
| SS Azerbaijan | 1932 | Soviet Union | 6,114 | Eastbound, 31 October – 9 November |
| SS Chernyshevsk1 | 1919 | Soviet Union | 3,588 | Eastbound, 2–11 November |
| SS Donbass | 1935 | Soviet Union | 7,925 | Eastbound, 4–7 November, bombed, sunk Z27, 76°24′N, 41°30′E |
| SS Dvina | 1922 | Soviet Union | 1,773 | Eastbound, 24 November – 5 December |
| SS Elna II | 1903 | Soviet Union | 3,221 | Eastbound, 25 November – 5 December |
| SS Kara | 1933 | Soviet Union | 2,325 | |
| SS Komsomolets Arctiki | 1897 | Soviet Union | 3,450 | Eastbound, 14–24 November |
| SS Krasnoe Znamya | 1901 | Soviet Union | 2,271 | |
| SS Kuzbass | 1914 | Soviet Union | 3,109 | |
| SS Mironich | 1927 | Soviet Union | 2,274 | Eastbound, 25 November – 5 December |
| SS Msta | 1921 | Soviet Union | 1,984 | |
| SS Mussoviet | 1935 | Soviet Union | 3,109 | Eastbound, 29 October – 7 November |
| SS OB | 1917 | Soviet Union | 2,198 | |
| SS Okhta | 1918 | Soviet Union | 1,357 | |
| SS Osmussaar | 1909 | Soviet Union | 2,229 | |
| SS Sakko | 1929 | Soviet Union | 2,363 | |
| SS Sheksna | 1918 | Soviet Union | 2,242 | |
| SS Shilka | 1916 | Soviet Union | 1,388 | |
| SS Soroka | 1926 | Soviet Union | 1,718 | |
| SS Uritski | 1929 | Soviet Union | 2,336 | |
| SS Vanzetti | 1928 | Soviet Union | 2,368 | |
| SS Vetluga | 1918 | Soviet Union | 1,717 | |

=== Other Soviet sailings ===
Russian sailings, January 1943
| Name | Year | Flag | GRT | Notes |
|---|---|---|---|---|
| SS UFA | 1917 | Soviet Union | 1,892 | Westbound to Iceland, sunk 29 January U-255 |
| SS Krasny Partizan | 1927 | Soviet Union | 2,418 | Westbound to Iceland, sunk 29 January U-354, 51† |
| SS Bureya | 1908 | Soviet Union | 2,723 | Westbound to Iceland |
| SS Leonid Krasin | 1913 | Soviet Union | 1,840 | Westbound to Iceland |
| SS Andrei Marti | 1918 | Soviet Union | 2,352 | Eastbound to White Sea, arr. 20 February |
| SS Mossovet | 1935 | Soviet Union | 2,981 | Eastbound to White Sea, arr. 20 February |

== Bibliography ==
- Budiansky, S. (2000). Battle of Wits: The Complete Story of Codebreaking in World War II. New York: The Free Press (Simon & Schuster). ISBN 0-684-85932-7 – via Archive Foundation.
- Edgerton, D. (2011). Britain's War Machine: Weapons, Resources and Experts in the Second World War. London: Allen Lane. ISBN 978-0-7139-9918-1.
- Hinsley, F. H. (1994) [1993]. British Intelligence in the Second World War: Its Influence on Strategy and Operations. History of the Second World War (2nd rev. abr. ed.). London: HMSO. ISBN 978-0-11-630961-7.
- Hutson, H. C. (2006). Arctic Interlude: Independent to North Russia. Bennington, VA: Merriam Press. ISBN 978-1-57638-118-2.
- Jordan, Roger W. (2006) [1999]. The World's Merchant Fleets 1939: The Particulars and Wartime Fates of 6,000 Ships (2nd ed.). London: Chatham/Lionel Leventhal. ISBN 978-1-86176-293-1.
- Kahn, D. (1973) [1967]. The Codebreakers: The Story of Secret Writing (10th abr. Signet, Chicago ed.). New York: Macmillan. LCCN 63-16109. OCLC 78083316.
- Macksey, K. (2004) [2003]. The Searchers: Radio Intercept in two World Wars (Cassell Military Paperbacks ed.). London: Cassell. ISBN 978-0-304-36651-4.
- Rohwer, Jürgen; Hümmelchen, Gerhard (2005) [1972]. Chronology of the War at Sea, 1939–1945: The Naval History of World War Two (3rd rev. ed.). London: Chatham. ISBN 1-86176-257-7.
- Roskill, S. W. (1962) [1956]. The Period of Balance. History of the Second World War: The War at Sea 1939–1945. Vol. II (3rd impr. ed.). London: HMSO. OCLC 174453986.
- Ruegg, Bob; Hague, Arnold (1993) [1992]. Convoys to Russia (2nd rev. exp. pbk. ed.). Kendal: World Ship Society. ISBN 978-0-905617-66-4.
- The Rise and Fall of the German Air Force (repr. Public Record Office War Histories ed.). Richmond, Surrey: Air Ministry. 2001 [1948]. ISBN 978-1-903365-30-4. Air 41/10.
- Woodman, Richard (2004) [1994]. Arctic Convoys 1941–1945. London: John Murray. ISBN 978-0-7195-5752-1.

Websites

- "Birth of Radio Intelligence in Finland and its Developer Reino Hallamaa". Pohjois–Kymenlaakson Asehistoriallinen Yhdistys Ry (North-Karelia Historical Association Ry) (in Finnish). 1996.
