= D71 =

D71 may refer to:

- D. 71, Trio "Die zwei Tugendwege" for two tenors and bass, composed by Franz Schubert in 1813
- HMS Volunteer (D71), Modified W-class destroyer of the British Royal Navy that saw service in World War II
