= Richard Alvey =

Richard Alvey may refer to:

- Richard Alvey (priest) (died 1584), English Anglican master of the Temple
- Richard H. Alvey (1826–1906), American jurist
  - SS Richard H. Alvey, a Liberty ship
