= HMS Niger (J73) =

Minesweeper

Coordinates: 66°35′N 23°14′W

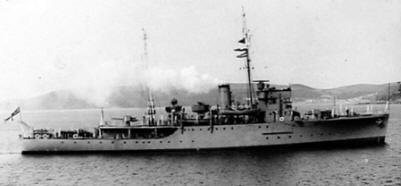
- Niger in 1940

History

United Kingdom
- Name: Niger
- Ordered: 5 February 1935
- Builder: J. Samuel White, Cowes
- Laid down: 1 April 1935
- Launched: 29 January 1936
- Home port: Dover, Kent
- Identification: Pennant number: J73
- Fate: Sunk on 5 July 1942 from damage caused by a mine off Iceland.

General characteristics
- Class & type: Halcyon-class minesweeper
- Displacement: 815–835 long tons (828–848 t); 1,310–1,372 long tons (1,331–1,394 t), full load
- Length: 245 ft 3 in (74.75 m)
- Beam: 33 ft 6 in (10.21 m)
- Draught: 9 ft (2.7 m)
- Propulsion: Vertical triple-expansion, 2,000 ihp (1,500 kW)
- Speed: 17 knots (31 km/h)
- Range: 7,200 nmi (13,330 km) at 10 knots (19 km/h)
- Complement: 80
- Armament: 2 × QF 4 in Mk.V (L/45 102 mm) guns, single mounts HA Mk.III; 4 × QF 0.5 in Mk.III (12.7 mm) Vickers machine guns, quad mount HA Mk.I; 8 × 0.303 in (7.7 mm) Lewis machine guns

HMS Niger was a Halcyon-class minesweeper of the Royal Navy. She was launched in 1936 and was sunk during the Second World War. On 5 July 1942, the vessel sailed into a minefield while escorting Convoy QP 13 and struck one of the mines, later sinking with only eight survivors.

== Service history ==
In fog on 5 July 1942 Niger mistook an iceberg for Iceland's North Western Cape and led six merchant ships of Murmansk to Reykjavík convoy QP 13 into Northern Barrage minefield SN72 laid one month earlier at the entrance to the Denmark Strait. Every ship detonated British mines. There were no crewmen lost aboard the Soviet freighter Rodina (4,441 GRT), the Panamanian-flagged freighter Exterminator (6,115 GRT), or the American freighter Hybert (6,120 GRT); but 46 civilian crew and 9 Naval Armed Guards died aboard the American Liberty ship John Randolph (7,191 GRT) and freighters Hefron (7,611 GRT) and Massmar (5,825 GRT); and there were only eight survivors of the 127 men aboard Niger. Only Exterminator could be salvaged. The value of the Northern Barrage was questioned following the accident.
