= HMS Volunteer (D71) =

Destroyer of the Royal Navy

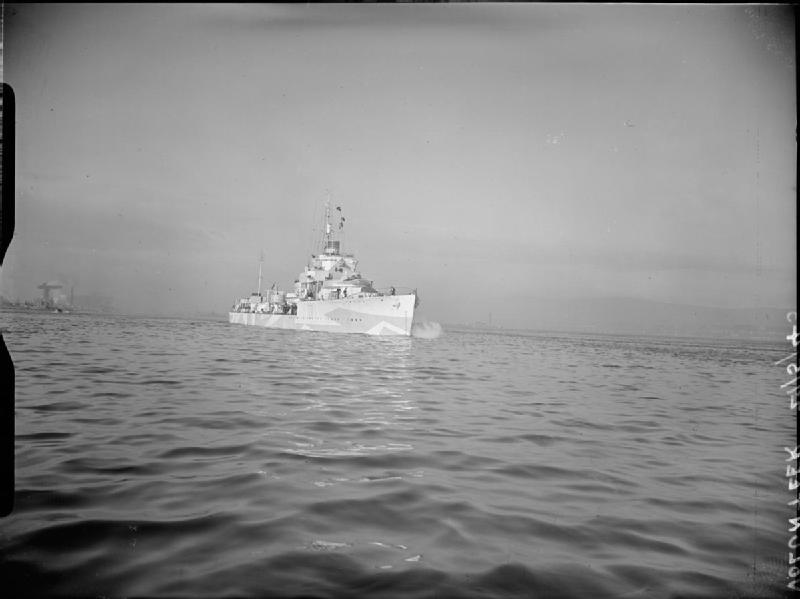
- HMS Volunteer underway on the River Clyde during World War II.

History

United Kingdom
- Name: HMS Volunteer
- Namesake: volunteer
- Ordered: January 1918
- Builder: William Denny and Brothers, Dunbarton
- Laid down: 16 April 1918
- Launched: 17 April 1919
- Completed: 7 November 1919
- Commissioned: 7 November 1919
- Decommissioned: early 1930s
- Recommissioned: August 1939
- Decommissioned: May 1945
- Motto: Pro aris et focis ("For Hearths and Homes ")
- Honours and awards: Battle honours for: Atlantic 1939-1945; English Channel 1940-1945; Arctic 1942; Biscay 1943; Normandy 1944; North Sea 1945
- Fate: Sold for scrapping 3 or 4 March 1947
- Badge: A gold lion's mask on a gold shield over a silver barry of three, all on a blue field

General characteristics
- Class & type: Admiralty Modified W-class destroyer
- Displacement: 1,140 tons standard, 1,550 tons full
- Length: 300 ft (91.4 m) o/a, 312 ft (95.1 m) p/p
- Beam: 29.5 feet (9.0 m)
- Draught: 9 feet (2.7 m), 11.25 feet (3.4 m) under full load
- Propulsion: Yarrow type Water-tube boilers, Brown-Curtis geared steam turbines, 2 shafts, 27,000 shp
- Speed: 34 knots (63 km/h; 39 mph)
- Range: 320–370 tons oil; 3,500 nmi (6,500 km; 4,000 mi) at 15 knots (28 km/h; 17 mph); 900 nmi (1,700 km; 1,000 mi) at 32 knots (59 km/h; 37 mph)
- Complement: 127
- Sensors & processing systems: Type 286M Air Warning Radar fitted 1940; Type 271 Surface Warning Radar fitted 1940
- Armament: As built 1920: 4 × BL 4.7 in (120-mm) Mk.I guns, mount P Mk.I; 2 × QF 2 pdr Mk.II "pom-pom" (40 mm L/39); 6 × 21-inch Torpedo Tubes; 1940 SRE conversion: 3 × BL 4.7 in (120mm) Mk.I L/45 guns; 1 × 3 in (76 mm) AA gun; 2 × QF 2 pdr Mk.II "pom-pom" (40 mm L/39); 3 × 21-inch Torpedo Tubes (one triple mount); 2 × depth charge racks; twin 6 pounder army gun (1942 – replaced 'A' gun)

The fourth HMS Volunteer (D71), later I71, was a Modified W-class destroyer of the British Royal Navy that saw service in World War II.

== Construction and commissioning ==
Volunteer was ordered in January 1918 as part of the 13th Order of the 1918-1919 Naval Programme. She was laid down on 16 April 1918 by William Denny and Brothers at Dumbarton, Scotland, and launched on 17 April 1919. She was completed on 7 November 1919 and commissioned into service the same day with the pennant number D71.

== Service history ==
=== Before World War II ===
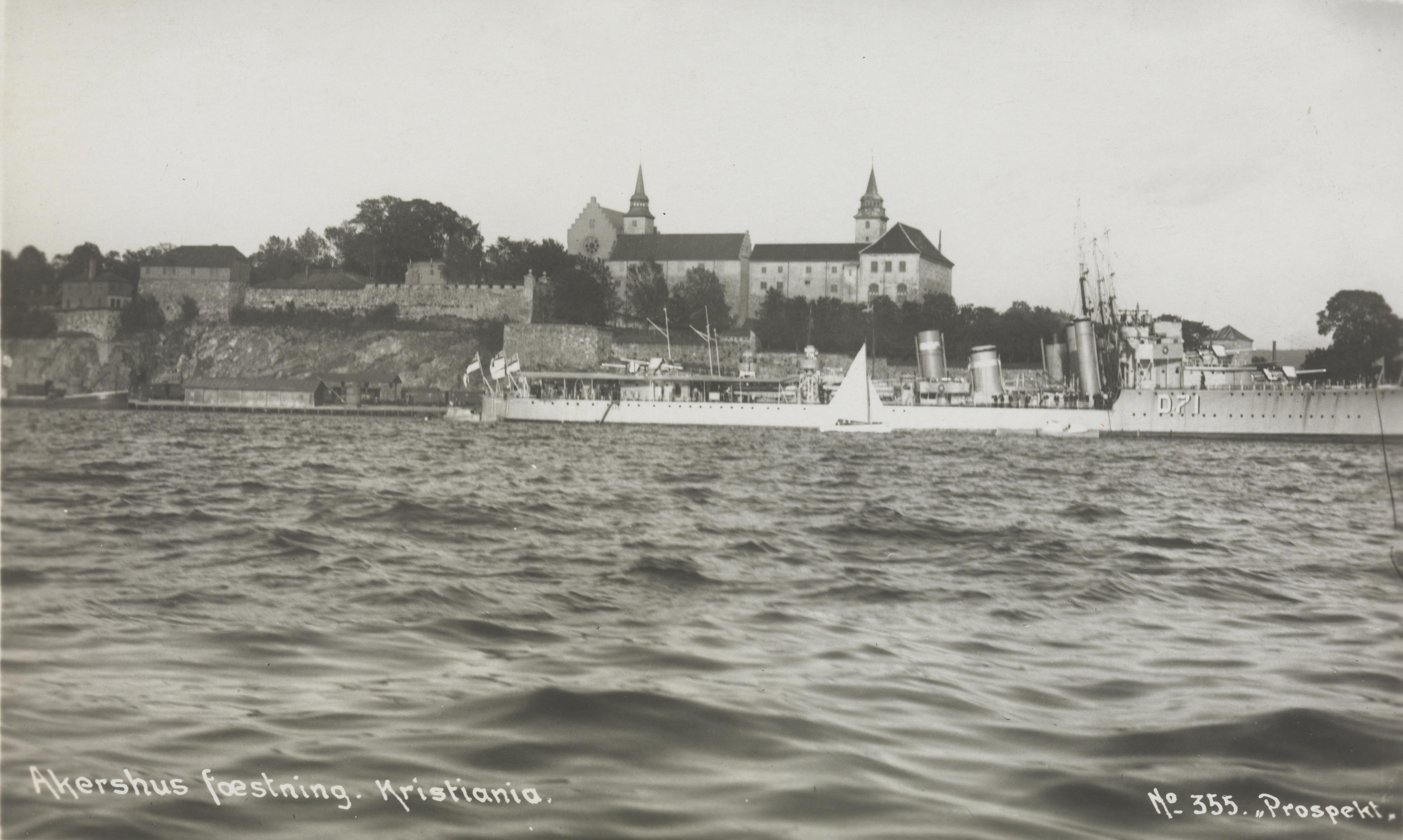
Volunteer tied up at Akershus fortress, Oslo, Norway, shortly after WWI

Volunteer entered service with the fleet in 1919. During 1921 she was assigned to the 4th Destroyer Flotilla in the Atlantic Fleet, and in 1925 she was transferred to the Mediterranean Fleet along with the rest of the flotilla. During the early 1930s, she was decommissioned, transferred to the Reserve Fleet, and placed in the Nore Reserve. She later was moved to Rosyth, Scotland, remaining in reserve there.

In August 1939, Volunteer was recommissioned with a reserve crew for the Royal Review of the Reserve Fleet in Weymouth Bay by King George VI. She then remained in commission as the fleet mobilised because of deteriorating diplomatic relations between the United Kingdom and Nazi Germany

=== World War II ===
==== 1939 ====
The United Kingdom entered World War II on 3 September 1939, and Volunteer was assigned to the 15th Destroyer Flotilla. On 5 September, she joined the destroyers Vimy, Witherington, and Wolverine as the escort for Convoy GC 1 from Milford Haven, Wales. In October 1939 she was transferred to the 17th Destroyer Flotilla in Western Approaches Command for convoy defence operations in the Western Approaches and North Atlantic Ocean, based at Plymouth, and she continued these duties into 1940.

==== 1940 ====
On 8 January 1940, Volunteer joined the destroyers Vanoc, Venetia, and Viscount in escorting Convoy HG 13 during the final leg of its voyage from Gibraltar to Liverpool, detaching from the convoy in the Irish Sea on 10 January 1940 to return to Plymouth. On 5 March 1940, Volunteer, the destroyer Whirlwind, and the sloops Enchantress and Sandwich joined Convoy OG 21F as it formed for its voyage to Gibraltar; Volunteer stayed with the convoy until 8 March, then during her return voyage to Plymouth joined Venetia, Whirlwind, the destroyers Veteran and Wild Swan, and the sloop Leith in an unsuccessful search in the Southwestern Approaches for a German submarine reported by an Allied aircraft. From 25 to 26 March, Volunteer, the destroyer leader Campbell, the destroyers Walker and Wanderer, and the sloop Aberdeen escorted Convoy OG 23 in the Southwestern Approaches during the first leg of its voyage from the United Kingdom to Gibraltar. From 27 to 30 March, Volunteer and the sloops Scarborough and Wellington escorted Convoy HG 23 during the final portion of its voyage from Gibraltar to Liverpool.

In April 1940, Volunteer was detached to serve under Rear Admiral (Destroyers) in the Home Fleet at Scapa Flow in the Orkney Islands and support the operations of Allied forces in the Norwegian Campaign, which began on 9 April when Germany invaded Norway. She was assigned to escort convoys between the United Kingdom and Norway. The first of these was Convoy NP 1, the first troop convoy to Norway, in which she joined Vanoc, Whirlwind, Witherington, the light cruisers Birmingham and Manchester, the destroyer Highlander, and the netlayer Protector in escorting between 11 and 15 April as it crossed from the River Clyde in Scotland to Norway. She escorted similar convoys until 26 April, when she joined the destroyers Beagle, Encounter, Escort, Fortune, and Grenade as the escort for the aircraft carriers Ark Royal and Glorious during air operations in defence of fleet units at Andalsnes and Namsos, Norway. While thus engaged, she made an unsuccessful attack on a German submarine on 27 April before escorting Glorious to Scapa Flow for refuelling and aircraft replenishment.

In May 1940 – the month in which her pennant number was changed to I71 – Volunteer continued to deploy off Norway. On 27 May, she, the destroyer Amazon, and the sloop Fleetwood escorted the damaged destroyer Eskimo, under tow from Skjelfjord, Norway, to the United Kingdom for repairs.

With the German conquest of Norway bringing the Norwegian Campaign to a close, Volunteer returned to Western Approaches Command in June 1940 for convoy defence and patrol duties in the Western Approaches and North Atlantic. On 7 June 1940, Volunteer, the destroyer Wren, and the minesweeper Gleaner rescued survivors of the armed merchant cruiser Carinthia, which had sunk that day west of Galway Bay, Ireland, 36 hours after being torpedoed on 6 June at 53°13′00″N 010°40′00″W by the German submarine U-46. The same day, Volunteer rescued the master of the British merchant ship SS Frances Massey, who was the sole survivor after the ship sank in only 30 seconds with the loss of 34 lives following a torpedo hit by the German submarine U-48 14 nautical miles (22.5 km) northwest of Tory Island, Ireland, at 55°33′00″N 008°26′00″W. On 8 June, Volunteer escorted the heavy cruiser Devonshire, which had the Norwegian royal family embarked, to the Clyde.

In July 1940, Volunteer escorted a convoy bound for Casablanca, French Morocco, for part of its voyage, detaching at Gibraltar to take up duties as a local escort for convoys. In August 1940, she provided local escort services for convoys bound for Operation Menace, the unsuccessful British attempt to occupy Dakar in Senegal, as well as for transatlantic convoys bound for the United Kingdom and two convoys in the English Channel. After the German submarine U-32 torpedoed the light cruiser Fiji on 1 September while underway to join the Dakar occupation force, Volunteer was among the destroyers that escorted her to the River Clyde in Scotland for repairs.

In September 1940, Volunteer was transferred to convoy defence and anti-invasion patrol duties in the English Channel. She participated in night sweeps along the French coast, and in October 1940 took part in Operation Medium as one of two destroyers covering a naval force which bombarded Cherbourg, France. In November or December 1940 (sources differ), she returned to Western Approaches Command and resumed convoy escort operations in the Western Approaches and North Atlantic.

==== 1941 ====
In January 1941, Volunteer was reassigned to the 5th Escort Group, based at Londonderry (also called Derry), Northern Ireland, in which she joined Vanoc, Walker, the destroyer Caldwell, and nine Flower-class corvettes. She continued convoy defence operations in the North Atlantic with the group, which was under the command of Commander Donald Macintyre. In March 1941, Volunteer, Vanoc, Walker (serving as Macintyre's flagship), the destroyers Sardonyx and Scimitar, and the corvettes Bluebell and Hydrangea were escorting Convoy HX 112 when the German submarine U-110 sighted it. After Vanoc detected U-110 with radar, the escorts forced the submarine to submerge and depth-charged her. HX 112 then came under attack on 16–17 March by five German submarines, and its escorts were heavily engaged in its defence, during which Vanoc and Walker sank U-99, capturing her commanding officer, Otto Kretschmer, and Vanoc sank U-100, killing her commanding officer, Joachim Schepke.

In April 1941, Volunteer was deployed at Devonport. On 10 or 17-18 April (sources differ) she was taking part in a local exercise when the destroyer Newark accidentally rammed her off the coast of Ireland. Volunteer suffered six men killed and serious damage to her forward structure. Later in the month, she proceeded to Belfast, Northern Ireland, for repairs at a commercial shipyard until September 1941.

Volunteer returned to action with the 5th Escort Group in October 1941, and with the group formed part of the escort of Convoy HX 155. On 9 December 1941, she put to sea from Milford Haven as part of the escort of the battleship Ramillies, which was sailing to join the Eastern Fleet, escorting a troop convoy along the way. Ramillies, Volunteer, and the ships accompanying them escorted the convoy, WS 14, from 13 to 15 December 1941, when Volunteer and the destroyer Witch detached to return to the Clyde after the convoy arrived at Gibraltar.

In December 1941, Volunteer was "adopted" by the city of Hereford in a Warship Week national savings campaign.

==== 1942 ====
On 12 January 1942, Volunteer put to sea from the Clyde with Vanoc, Walker, Witherington, and the destroyer Vanquisher as the local escort of the military convoy WS 15 during its passage of the Northwestern Approaches, detaching on 15 January to return to the Clyde. Similarly, she departed the Clyde on 23 March 1942 with the destroyers Antelope, Beverley, Boadicea, Keppel, Leamington, Newport, and Rockingham and the escort destroyer Badsworth as the local escort for the military convoy WS 17 while it transited the Northwestern Approaches during the first leg of its voyage to the Middle East. After Keppel achieved a radio direction-finding fix on the German submarine U-587 on 26 March 1942, the escorts sighted the submarine on the surface and expended all of their depth charges in attacking her after she submerged. Volunteer shared credit with Leamington and the escort destroyers Aldenham and Grove for sinking U-587 in the North Atlantic west of Ushant at 47°21′00″N 021°39′00″W with the loss of her entire crew of 42. Volunteer detached from the convoy later that day to return to the Clyde.

From 18 to 20 April 1942, Volunteer, Badsworth, Boadicea, the destroyers Georgetown, Lancaster, St. Marys, and Salisbury, and the escort destroyer Lauderdale escorted the military convoy WS 18 during the first leg of its voyage in the Northwestern Approaches after departing the Clyde, detaching with Boadicea to return to the Clyde. Volunteer put to sea from the Clyde on 10 May 1942 along with Keppel, Leamington, St. Marys, and the destroyer Castleton to escort the military convoy WS 19 during the first leg of its voyage in the Northwestern Approaches; she detached to return to the Clyde on 13 May.

After her return, Volunteer was assigned to the support of Arctic convoys steaming between the United Kingdom and the Soviet Union. Accordingly, she and the destroyers Achates, Ashanti, and Martin, the antiaircraft ship Alynbank, the corvettes Honeysuckle, Hyderabad, and Starwort, the Polish Navy destroyer ORP Garland, and the Free French Naval Forces corvette Roselys joined the escort of Convoy PQ 16 on 23 March for its voyage to the Soviet Union. German aircraft continuously shadowed the convoy, and German bombers, torpedo planes, and submarines carried out heavy attacks against it. On 25 March, Volunteer rescued the pilot of a Hawker Hurricane fighter from a Catapult Aircraft Merchantman (CAM ship) after the American merchant ship Carlton mistakenly had shot him down. Before German attacks ceased, PQ-16 had suffered the loss of seven of its 34 merchant ships and damage to four others and to Garland. On 30 March, the escorting ships handed the convoy over to the Eastern Local Escort and proceeded to port in North Russia, where Volunteer remained until she and the same ships that had protected PQ 16 escorted Convoy QP 13 from the Kola Inlet to the United Kingdom in a voyage which began on 26 June 1942. After an uneventful passage, Volunteer detached from the convoy at sea near Bear Island on 5 or 6 July 1942 (sources differ) to proceed to the United Kingdom.

Upon her return, Volunteer entered a dockyard at Rosyth, Scotland, in July 1942 for a refit and to undergo conversion into a Long-Range Escort. She was in dockyard hands for the rest of 1942.

==== 1943 ====
With her conversion complete, Volunteer underwent post-conversion acceptance trials in January 1943 and proceeded to Tobermory on the Isle of Mull for workups. After she completed these in February 1943, she was assigned to the 4th Escort Group – in which she joined Beverley, Highlander, the destroyer Winchelsea, and six Flower-class corvettes – based at Greenock, Scotland.

In March 1943, Volunteer was the flagship of Commander G. J. Luther, commanding the escort – which also included Beverley and the corvettes Anemone and Pennywort – of Convoy HX 229, consisting of 40 merchant ships. HX 229 and Convoy SC 122 came under attack by German submarines of the Raubgraf ("Robber Baron") and Dranger ("Harrier") wolfpacks on 16 March, and the action developed into the largest convoy battle of World War II, with 38 German submarines of three wolfpacks involved. During heavy German attacks on 17 March, the submarine U-616 made an unsuccessful torpedo attack on Volunteer. By the time the escorts, outnumbered two-to-one by attacking submarines, received reinforcements on 18 March and the German attacks abated, HX 229 had lost 13 merchant ships sunk, and its escorts, although constantly attacking submarine contacts, had been unable to sink any of the attacking submarines.

In May 1943, Volunteer joined the 5th Escort Group in escorting Convoy ONS 7. The convoy underwent a series of attacks by German submarines of the Donau 1 ("Danube" 1) group from 11 to 13 May, and attacks resumed on 17 May. However, the convoy took evasive action and lost only one merchant ship.

Volunteer continued her North Atlantic convoy defence operations from June to September 1943, but also began escorting convoys between the United Kingdom and Gibraltar carrying troops, equipment, and supplies for Allied offensive operations in Sicily and Italy. From June to September, she also took part in offensive antisubmarine operations by Allied ships and aircraft in the Bay of Biscay targeting German submarines transiting the bay between their bases in German-occupied France and their operating areas in the Atlantic. In October 1943, she participated in Operation Alacrity, the establishment of Allied air and refueling bases in the Azores, by deploying with the 4th and 5th Escort Groups as an escort for convoys carrying personnel, equipment, and supplies to the Azores. In November she returned to the antisubmarine offensive in the Bay of Biscay, and she resumed convoy defence operations in the North Atlantic in December 1943.

==== 1944-1945 ====
Volunteer continued on North Atlantic convoy escort duty until April 1944, when she was reassigned to operations in the English Channel escorting convoys along the coast of Great Britain. Later in the month she was assigned to convoy escort operations in Operation Neptune in support of the Allied invasion of Normandy, scheduled for early June 1944. On 21 April 1944, she and the escort destroyer Haldon and Free French Naval Forces escort destroyer La Combattante were in action against German motor torpedo boats – S-boats, known to the Allies as "E-boats" – of the 9th Flotilla off Hastings.

In early June 1944, Volunteer joined the trawlers Ellesmere, Kingston Andalusite, and Ruby and the Royal Canadian Navy corvette HMCS Summerside at Milford Haven to form Escort Group 144 of Force B for the Normandy landings. On 4 June, the group escorted Convoy EBC2 – consisting of 32 motor transport carriers and coasters and five oil tankers – from Milford Haven through the Bristol Channel to the Solent; after the landings were postponed from 5 to 6 June due to bad weather, the convoy's arrival in the Solent was delayed to 6 June. On 7 June, the second day of the invasion, the convoy and its escorts got underway from the Solent and proceeded to the American beachhead in Normandy, off which they arrived on 8 June. Later that day, Volunteer detached from the convoy to return to Milford Haven and begin escorting convoys bringing reinforcements and supplies to the beaches, the first of which she escorted through the Bristol Channel on 10 June. She continued to escort convoys to Normandy until later in June, when she was released from Operation Neptune.

In July 1944, Volunteer came under the Commander-in-Chief, Portsmouth and returned to the escort of coastal convoys in the English Channel. In August 1944, she was one of the escorts of three tank landing ships which discharged supplies for the United States Army's 12th Army Group at Saint-Michel-en-Grève, France. In November 1944 she became part of the 1st Destroyer Flotilla (Portsmouth), and in December 1944 she became part of the 21st Destroyer Flotilla under the Commander-in-Chief, The Nore at Sheerness. By January 1945, she was escorting convoys in the Nore, the North Sea, and the English Channel. She continued in these duties without major incident through the surrender of Germany in early May 1945 and until the end of May 1945.

== Decommissioning and disposal ==
Withdrawn from operational service at the end of May 1945, Volunteer was decommissioned and placed in reserve in June 1945, and by July 1945, she no longer appeared on the Royal Navy's active list. Placed on the disposal list in 1947, she was sold to BISCO on 3 or 4 March 1947 (sources differ) for scrapping by either M. Brechin or by Granton Shipbreaking (sources differ). She was towed to the shipbreaker's yard at Granton, Edinburgh, Scotland, in December 1947 or April 1948 (sources differ) and scrapped there in April 1948.

== Bibliography ==
- Campbell, John (1985). Naval Weapons of World War II. Annapolis, Maryland: Naval Institute Press. ISBN 0-87021-459-4.
- Chesneau, Roger, ed. (1980). Conway's All the World's Fighting Ships 1922–1946. Greenwich, UK: Conway Maritime Press. ISBN 0-85177-146-7.
- Colledge, J. J.; Warlow, Ben (2006) [1969]. Ships of the Royal Navy: The Complete Record of All Fighting Ships of the Royal Navy from the 15th Century to the Present (3rd Rev ed.). London: Chatham Publishing. ISBN 978-1-86176-281-8. OCLC 67375475.
- Cocker, Maurice. Destroyers of the Royal Navy, 1893–1981. Ian Allan. ISBN 0-7110-1075-7.
- Friedman, Norman (2009). British Destroyers From Earliest Days to the Second World War. Annapolis, Maryland: Naval Institute Press. ISBN 978-1-59114-081-8.
- Gardiner, Robert & Gray, Randal, eds. (1985). Conway's All the World's Fighting Ships 1906–1921. Annapolis, Maryland: Naval Institute Press. ISBN 0-85177-245-5.
- Lenton, H. T. (1998). British & Empire Warships of the Second World War. Annapolis, Maryland: Naval Institute Press. ISBN 1-55750-048-7.
- March, Edgar J. (1966). British Destroyers: A History of Development, 1892–1953; Drawn by Admiralty Permission From Official Records & Returns, Ships' Covers & Building Plans. London: Seeley Service. OCLC 164893555.
- Preston, Antony (1971). 'V & W' Class Destroyers 1917–1945. London: Macdonald. OCLC 464542895.
- Raven, Alan & Roberts, John (1979). 'V' and 'W' Class Destroyers. Man o'War. Vol. 2. London: Arms & Armour. ISBN 0-85368-233-X.
- Rohwer, Jürgen (2005). Chronology of the War at Sea 1939–1945: The Naval History of World War Two (Third Revised ed.). Annapolis, Maryland: Naval Institute Press. ISBN 1-59114-119-2.
- Whinney, Bob (2000). The U-boat Peril: A Fight for Survival. Cassell. ISBN 0-304-35132-6.
- Whitley, M. J. (1988). Destroyers of World War 2. Annapolis, Maryland: Naval Institute Press. ISBN 0-87021-326-1.
- Winser, John de D. (1999). B.E.F. Ships Before, At and After Dunkirk. Gravesend, Kent: World Ship Society. ISBN 0-905617-91-6.
