= Convoy QP 13 =

Convoy PQ 13
- Part of Arctic Convoys of the Second World War
- German occupied Norway (in green) lay along the flank of the sea route to northern Russia
| Date | 26 June – 7 July 1942 |
| Location | The Barents Sea and the Norwegian Sea |

Belligerents
| United Kingdom; Soviet Union; United States | Germany: Luftwaffe; Kriegsmarine |

Commanders and leaders
| Convoy Commodore: Newell Gale; J. Hiss; Escort: Percy Todd; Arthur Cubison | Hermann Boehm; Hubert Schmundt; Alfred Schulze-Hinrichs |

Units involved
| Convoy QP 13; Escorts | Reconnaissance aircraft; 2 U-boats |

Strength
| 36 Merchant ships | Reconnaissance aircraft; 2 U-boats |

Casualties and losses
| 173 merchant sailors killed; 4 merchant ships sunk; 2 merchant ships damaged; 1 escort sunk | |

Convoy QP 13 was an Arctic convoy of the PQ–QP series that ran during the Second World War. It was the thirteenth of the numbered series of return convoys of merchant ships westbound from the Arctic ports of Arkhangelsk and Murmansk to Britain, Iceland and North America. Greater ship losses from the increased number of aircraft and U-boats sent to Norway had caused some senior British naval officers to advocate the suspension of convoys for the summer but this was rejected by the political leaderships in Britain, the US and the USSR. The German transfer of cruisers and battleships to Norway during the year created opportunities for the Germans to adopt combined arms tactics that had contributed to increased ship losses during the year.

The Kriegsmarine planned a combined ship and U-boat operation in conjunction with the bombers and torpedo-bombers of Luftflotte V, despite inter-service disagreements. The operation was named Unternehmen Rösselspring (Operation Knight's Move) in which the big ships at Trondheim would transfer to Narvik for a joint attack on Convoy PQ 17 the reciprocal convoy to Convoy QP 13. British code breaking led to the German plan becoming known and the convoy escorts being ordered to rush westwards to join the distant escorts as the merchant ships to disperse to make a harder target for the German battleship and cruiser flotilla. Knight's Move was cancelled because of the destruction of much of the convoy by aircraft and U-boats.

Convoy QP 13 was able to escape the fate of the inbound convoy, as there was less point in sinking empty ships, despite several aircraft and U-boat sightings. As the convoy neared Iceland, the Admiralty unexpectedly split the convoy, the British ships to go direct to Loch Ewe in Scotland and the remainder, mainly US ships, to continue to Reykjavík. After three days without a navigational fix by celestial or solar observation in such poor weather an iceberg was mistaken for landfall and the convoy turned onto a course thought to be between the Icelandic coast and a new minefield. The leading escort blew up on a mine followed by four merchant ships sunk and two damaged, for a loss of 173 men killed. Both damaged ships were later written off, a total loss of 38,306 GRT. The surviving ships reached Reykjavík on 7 July.

== Background ==
=== Lend-lease ===
The Soviet leaders needed to replace the colossal losses of military equipment lost after the German invasion, especially when Soviet war industries were being moved out of the war zone and emphasised tank and aircraft deliveries. Machine tools, steel and aluminium was needed to replace indigenous resources lost in the invasion. The pressure on the civilian sector of the economy needed to be limited by food deliveries. The Soviets wanted to concentrate the resources that remained on items that the Soviet war economy had the greatest comparative advantage over the German economy. Aluminium imports allowed aircraft production to a far greater extent than would have been possible using local sources and tank production was emphasised at the expense of lorries and food supplies were squeezed by reliance on what could be obtained from lend–lease. At the Moscow Conference, it was acknowledged that 1.5 million tons of shipping was needed to transport the supplies of the First Protocol and that Soviet sources could provide less than 10 per cent of the carrying capacity.

The British and Americans accepted that the onus was on them to find most of the shipping, despite their commitments in other theatres. The Prime Minister, Winston Churchill, made a promise to send a convoy to the Arctic ports of the USSR every ten days and to deliver 1,200 tanks a month from July 1942 to January 1943, followed by 2,000 tanks and another 3,600 aircraft more than already promised. In November, the US president, Franklin D. Roosevelt, ordered Admiral Emory Land of the US Maritime Commission and then the head of the War Shipping Administration that deliveries to Russia should only be limited by 'insurmountable difficulties'. The first convoy was due at Murmansk around 12 October and the next convoy was to depart Iceland on 22 October. A motley of British, Allied and neutral shipping loaded with military stores and raw materials for the Soviet war effort would be assembled at Hvalfjörður in Iceland, convenient for ships from both sides of the Atlantic.

From Operation Dervish to Convoy PQ 11, the supplies to the USSR were mostly British, in British ships defended by the Royal Navy. A fighter force that could defend Murmansk was delivered that protected the Arctic ports and railways into the hinterland. Before September 1941 the British had dispatched 450 aircraft, 22,000 long tons (22,000 t) of rubber, 3,000,000 pairs of boots and stocks of tin, aluminium, jute, lead and wool. In September representatives from Britain and the United States travelled to Moscow to study Soviet requirements and their ability to meet them. The representatives of the three countries drew up a protocol in October 1941 to last until June 1942. British supplied aircraft and tanks reinforced the Russian defences of Leningrad and Moscow from December 1941. The tanks and aircraft did not save Moscow but were important in the Soviet counter-offensive. The Luftwaffe was by then reduced to 600 operational aircraft on the Eastern Front, to an extent a consequence of Luftflotte 2 being sent to the Mediterranean against the British. Tanks and aircraft supplied by the British helped the Soviet counter-offensive force push the Germans further back than might have been possible. In January and February 1941, deliveries of tanks and aircraft allowed the Russians to have a margin of safety should the Germans attempt to counter-attack.

=== Signals intelligence ===
==== Ultra ====
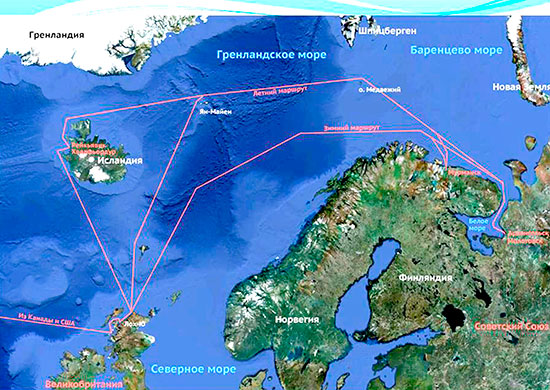
Russian map showing Arctic convoy routes from Britain and Iceland, past Norway to the Barents Sea and northern Russian ports

The British Government Code and Cypher School (GC&CS) based at Bletchley Park housed a small industry of code-breakers and traffic analysts. By June 1941, the German Enigma machine Home Waters (Heimish) settings used by surface ships and U-boats could quickly be read. On 1 February 1942, the Enigma machines used in U-boats in the Atlantic and Mediterranean were changed but German ships and the U-boats in Arctic waters continued with the older Heimish Home Hydra from 1942, Dolphin to the British). By mid-1941, British Y-stations were able to receive and read Luftwaffe W/T transmissions and give advance warning of Luftwaffe operations. In 1941, naval Headache personnel with receivers to eavesdrop on Luftwaffe wireless transmissions were embarked on warships.

=== B-Dienst ===
The rival German Beobachtungsdienst (B-Dienst, Observation Service) of the Kriegsmarine Marinenachrichtendienst (MND, Naval Intelligence Service) had broken several Admiralty codes and cyphers by 1939, which were used to help Kriegsmarine ships elude British forces and provide opportunities for surprise attacks. From June to August 1940, six British submarines were sunk in the Skaggerak using information gleaned from British wireless signals. In 1941, B-Dienst read signals from the Commander in Chief Western Approaches informing convoys of areas patrolled by U-boats, enabling the submarines to move into "safe" zones.

=== Arctic Ocean ===
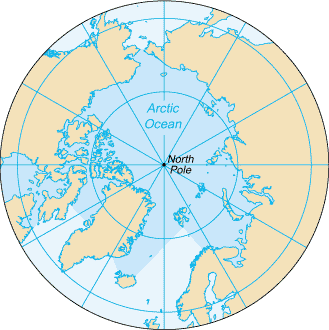
Diagram of the Arctic Ocean

Between Greenland and Norway are some of the most stormy waters of the world's oceans, 890 mi (1,440 km) of water under gales of snow, sleet and hail. The cold Arctic water was met by the Gulf Stream, warm water from the Gulf of Mexico, which became the North Atlantic Drift. Arriving at the south-west of England the drift moves between Scotland and Iceland; north of Norway the drift splits. One stream bears north of Bear Island to Svalbard and a southern stream follows the coast of Murmansk into the Barents Sea. The mingling of cold Arctic water and warmer water of higher salinity generates thick banks of fog for convoys to hide in but the waters drastically reduced the effectiveness of ASDIC as U-boats moved in waters of differing temperatures and density.

In winter, polar ice can form as far south as 50 mi (80 km) off the North Cape and in summer it can recede to Svalbard. The area is in perpetual darkness in winter and permanent daylight in the summer and can make air reconnaissance almost impossible. Around the North Cape and in the Barents Sea the sea temperature rarely rises about 4 °C (39 °F) and a man in the water will die unless rescued immediately. The cold water and air makes spray freeze on the superstructure of ships, which has to be removed quickly to avoid the ship becoming top-heavy. Conditions in U-boats were, if anything, worse the boats having to submerge in warmer water to rid the superstructure of ice. Crewmen on watch were exposed to the elements, oil lost its viscosity and nuts froze and sheared off bolts. Heaters in the hull were too demanding of current and could not be run continuously.

== Prelude ==
=== Kriegsmarine ===
German naval forces in Norway were commanded by Hermann Böhm, the Kommandierender Admiral Norwegen. Two U-boats were based in Norway in July 1941, four in September, five in December and two in January 1942, seven in February, nine in March and one in April, 23 boats in all, a number maintained for the rest of the year. Hitler contemplated establishing a unified command but decided against it. The German battleship Tirpitz arrived at Trondheim on 16 January, the first ship of a general move of surface ships to Norway. British convoys to Russia had received little attention in 1941, since they averaged only eight ships each and the long Arctic winter nights negated even the limited Luftwaffe reconnaissance effort that was available. On 20 February, the cruisers Prinz Eugen and Admiral Scheer arrived at Trondheim, followed in March by the cruisers Admiral Hipper and Lutzow. The transfer of more U-boats to Norway in 1942 along with the ships allowed the Kriegsmarine to contemplate more ambitious operations against Arctic convoys.

In May, despite the increased number of aircraft available to Luftflotte V, Marine Group Command Nord was sceptical of the ability to find the British distant escorts, despite the better weather at this time of year, because of the area of sea to be covered. Knowledge of the British dispositions was necessary if the big German ships were to be risked against a convoy. Generaladmiral Otto Schniewind, the Flottenchef (Fleet Commander) stressed to Raeder that June was the best month for an operation with its longer hours of daylight and the expectation that the Allies would make a special effort to get supplies to the USSR. SKL and Hubert Schmundt, the Admiral Eismeer agreed that the Allied effort should be met with equal determination. When the next convoy operation, the reciprocal Convoy PQ 17–Convoy QP 13 was found, Marine Group Command Nord wanted the ships at Trondheim to transfer to Narvik for a joint attack on Convoy PQ 17, as U-boats followed the convoy.

In Unternehmen Rösselsprung (Operation Knight's Move) the ships would race to the convoy, attack and withdraw before the distant escort and the Home Fleet could intervene. Tirpitz and Admiral Hipper would deal with the close escorts and the other ships would attack the convoy, disabled ships being left for the U-boats to sink later. Success would justify the fuel consumed and the danger of Allied submarines was judged to be no more than that of torpedo attack by destroyers. Hitler was told of the plan on 5 June and ordered that planning was to continue. On 8 June, SKL and Marine Group Command Nord accepted the plan but the command arrangements were as convoluted as ever and Luftflotte V disagreed with its aircraft being diverted to reconnaissance.

=== Luftflotte 5 ===
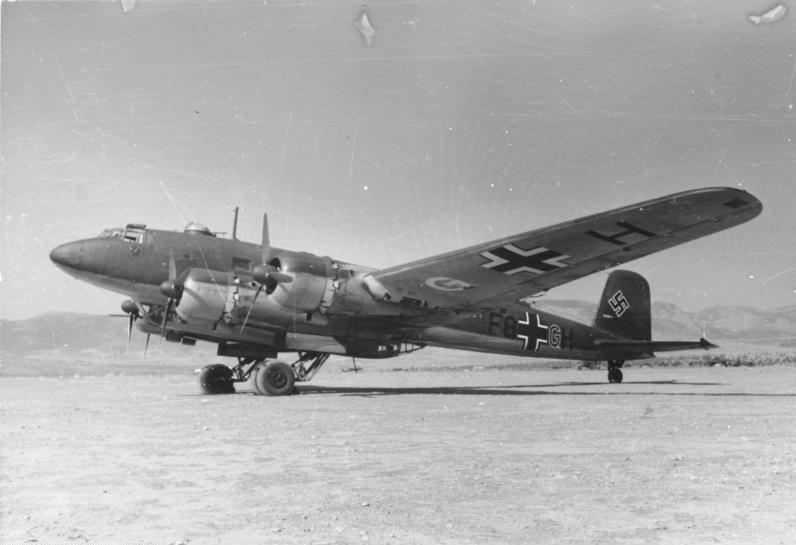
A Focke-Wulf Fw 200 Kondor of KG 40

In mid-1941, Luftflotte 5 (Air Fleet 5) had been re-organised for Operation Barbarossa with Luftgau Norwegen (Air Region Norway) headquartered in Oslo. Fliegerführer Stavanger (Air Commander Stavanger) the centre and north of Norway, Jagdfliegerführer Norwegen (Fighter Leader Norway) commanded the fighter force and Fliegerführer Kerkenes (Oberst [colonel] Andreas Nielsen) in the far north had airfields at Kirkenes and Banak. The Air Fleet had 180 aircraft, sixty of which were reserved for operations on the Karelian Front against the Red Army.

The distance from Banak to Arkhangelsk was 560 mi (900 km) and Fliegerführer Kerkenes had only ten Junkers Ju 88 bombers of Kampfgeschwader 30, thirty Junkers Ju 87 Stuka dive-bombers ten Messerschmitt Bf 109 fighters of Jagdgeschwader 77, five Messerschmitt Bf 110 heavy fighters of Zerstörergeschwader 76, ten reconnaissance aircraft and an anti-aircraft battalion. Sixty aircraft were far from adequate in such a climate and terrain where

...there is no favourable season for operations. (Earl Ziemke [1959] in Claasen [2001])

The emphasis of air operations changed from army support to anti-shipping operations only after March 1942, when Allied Arctic convoys were becoming larger, more frequent and coincided with the reinforcement of Norway with ships and aircraft, in the less extreme climatic conditions of the Arctic summer. The Luftflotte had 150 front line aircraft in January 1942 and 225 in February with the transfer of a bomber and a fighter wing from the Netherlands and eight Kondor long-range reconnaissance aircraft from Bordeaux to Trondheim. Luftflotte V now had sixty long-range bombers, thirty dive-bombers, 45 fighters and twenty long-range reconnaissance aircraft, with serviceability around 60 per cent. The Seeluftstreitkräfte of the Kriegsmarine had about 15 Heinkel He 115 seaplanes capable of torpedo-bombing. Towards the end of April, the Luftwaffe torpedo-bombers began to arrive, about half Junkers Ju 88s and half Heinkel He 111s, that had their first success against Convoy PQ 15 on 3 May; by July 77 torpedo-bombers had arrived.

=== Arctic convoys ===
A convoy was defined as at least one merchant ship sailing under the protection of at least one warship. At first the British had intended to run convoys to Russia on a forty-day cycle (the number of days between convoy departures) during the winter of 1941–1942, but this was shortened to a ten-day cycle. The round trip to Murmansk for warships was three weeks and each convoy needed a cruiser and two destroyers, which severely depleted the Home Fleet. Convoys left port and rendezvoused with the escorts at sea. A cruiser provided distant cover from a position to the west of Bear Island. Air support was limited to 330 Squadron and 269 Squadron of RAF Coastal Command from Iceland, with some help from anti-submarine patrols along the coast of Norway from RAF Sullom Voe in Shetland. Anti-submarine trawlers escorted the convoys on the first part of the outward voyage. Built for Arctic conditions, the trawlers were coal-burning ships and had sufficient endurance. The trawlers were commanded by their peacetime crews and captains with the rank of Skipper, Royal Naval Reserve (RNR) who were used to Arctic conditions, supplied by anti-submarine specialists of the Royal Naval Volunteer Reserve (RNVR). British minesweepers based at Arkhangelsk met the convoys to join the escort for the remainder of the voyage.

== Convoy QP 13 ==
The convoy consisted of 35 merchant ships, part of which departed from Arkhangelsk on 26 June, joining with a second contingent from Murmansk on 28 June, most of the ships being those that had arrived in Convoy PQ 16. The convoy commodore was Captain. Newell Gale Royal Navy Reserve (RNR) was the convoy commodore, in Empire Selwyn. Most of the ships were returning empty after delivering war material to the Soviet Union but some Soviet ships carried cargoes of export timber. The eastern local escort from 26 to 28 June consisted of Grozny, Gremyaschi and Kuibyshev with the Halcyon-class minesweepers HMS Bramble, HMS Hazard, HMS Leda and HMS Seagull.

The ocean escort for the convoy was, from 26 to 28 June, the submarine HMS Trident, from 26 June to 3 July, the destroyers, HMS Inglefield and Intrepid, to 5 July the minesweeper Niger, to 7 July the destroyers Achates Garland, and Volunteer, minesweeper Hussar and the corvettes Honeysuckle, Hyderabad, Roselys and Starwort with the anti-aircraft cruiser HMS Alynbank and the trawlers HMT Lady Madeleine and St Elstan.

The convoy sailed simultaneously with eastbound Convoy PQ 17 for both convoys to benefit from the heavy covering force of the British aircraft carrier HMS Victorious, the battleship HMS Duke of York, the cruisers HMS Cumberland and Nigeria and the destroyers HMS Ashanti, Douglas, Faulknor, Marne, Martin, Onslaught and Onslow with the United States Navy battleship USS Washington and destroyers USS Mayrant and Rhind. The covering force was commanded by Admiral John Tovey aboard the flagship Duke of York. Force Q, the tanker RFA Gray Ranger and its escort the destroyer Douglas cruised near Jan Mayen to fuel the home Fleet destroyers and then join Convoy QP 13 for the voyage home.

== Voyage ==
=== 26 June − 3 July ===
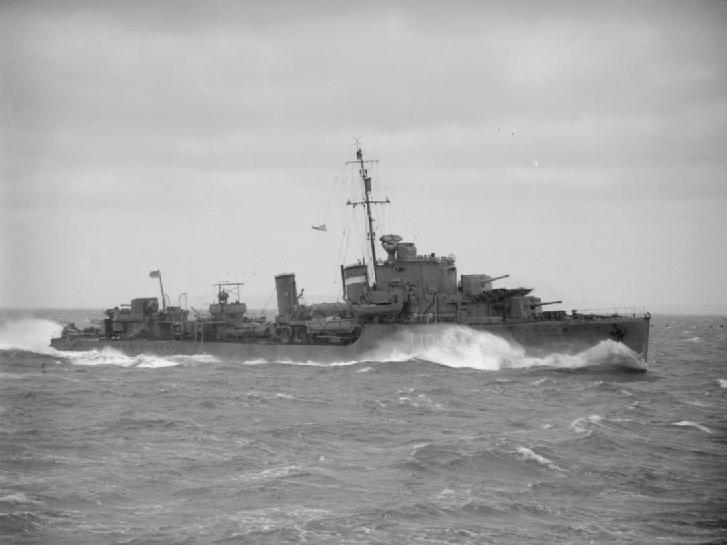
Intrepid, one of five destroyers escorting Convoy QP 13

The twelve ships of the Arkhangelsk section of the convoy departed on 26 June 1942, with the Eastern local escort. The local escort was replaced in relays by the Ocean escort (Senior Officer Escort, Commander Percy Todd) and the Murmansk section of the convoy joined on 28 June. Inglefield and Intrepid carried survivors from HMS Edinburgh, sunk on 2 May during Convoy QP 11; other survivors had joined the Polish destroyer Garland. Overcast and fog in the Barents Sea left the convoy dependent on dead reckoning navigation On 30 June German air reconnaissance found the convoy 180 mi (290 km) north of the North Cape (Nordkapp).

Reconnaissance aircraft and the U-boat, U-88, were shadowing the convoy by 2 July, the day that the convoy crossed with Convoy PQ 17. Force Q, the tanker RFA Gray Ranger and its destroyer, Douglas, transferred to Convoy QP 13. Later in the day, the Admiralty passed instructions that the convoy was to divide, 19 ships for Loch Ewe and 16 mainly US ships to Hvalfjörður. The Admiral Nordmeer, Hubert Schmundt, ordered German forces of Unternehmen Rösselsprung to ignore the empty westbound ships and concentrate on Convoy PQ 17. On 3 July, Garland, Inglefield and Intrepid were ordered by the Admiralty to reconnoitre to the south for Tirpitz, whose position was unknown to the British but nothing was found.

=== 4 July ===
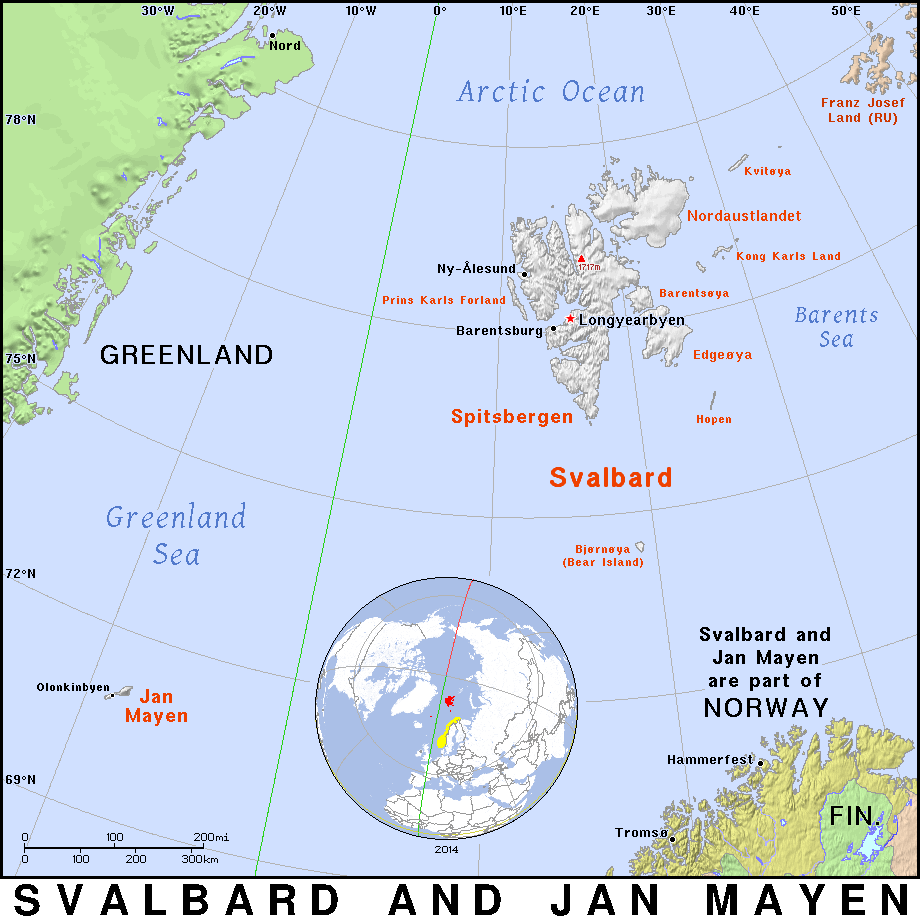
Map showing Svalbard, Bear Island and Jan Mayen

On 4 July the convoy came close to the north Icelandic coast and divided according to the Admiralty instructions of 2 July. Gale and 19 ships altered course for Loch Ewe and arrived after an uneventful journey. Most of the ships due to dock at Hvalfjörður were of the US merchant ships and Captain J. Hiss of American Robin took over as Convoy Commodore, escorted by Inglefield and Intrepid with Niger, Roselys, St Elstan and Lady Madeleine, the Senior Officer escort being the captain of Niger Commander A. J. Cubison.

=== 5−7 July ===
Early on 5 July, Inglefield and Intrepid detached from the convoy to fuel at Seyðisfjörður on the east coast of Iceland. The convoy ran into fog on 5 and as the convoy closed on Straumnes on the Westfjords peninsula, at the north-west of Iceland on the Denmark Strait, Hiss organised the ships into five columns that headed south-west, rolling and pitching, the waves driven by a gale blowing from the north-east. The sky was overcast and the last fix of position was 72 hours old. At 7:10 p.m. Cubison suggested to Hiss that the ships form two columns, to pass between Straumnes and minefield SN72, at the entrance to the Denmark Strait to the north-west that had been laid one month earlier.

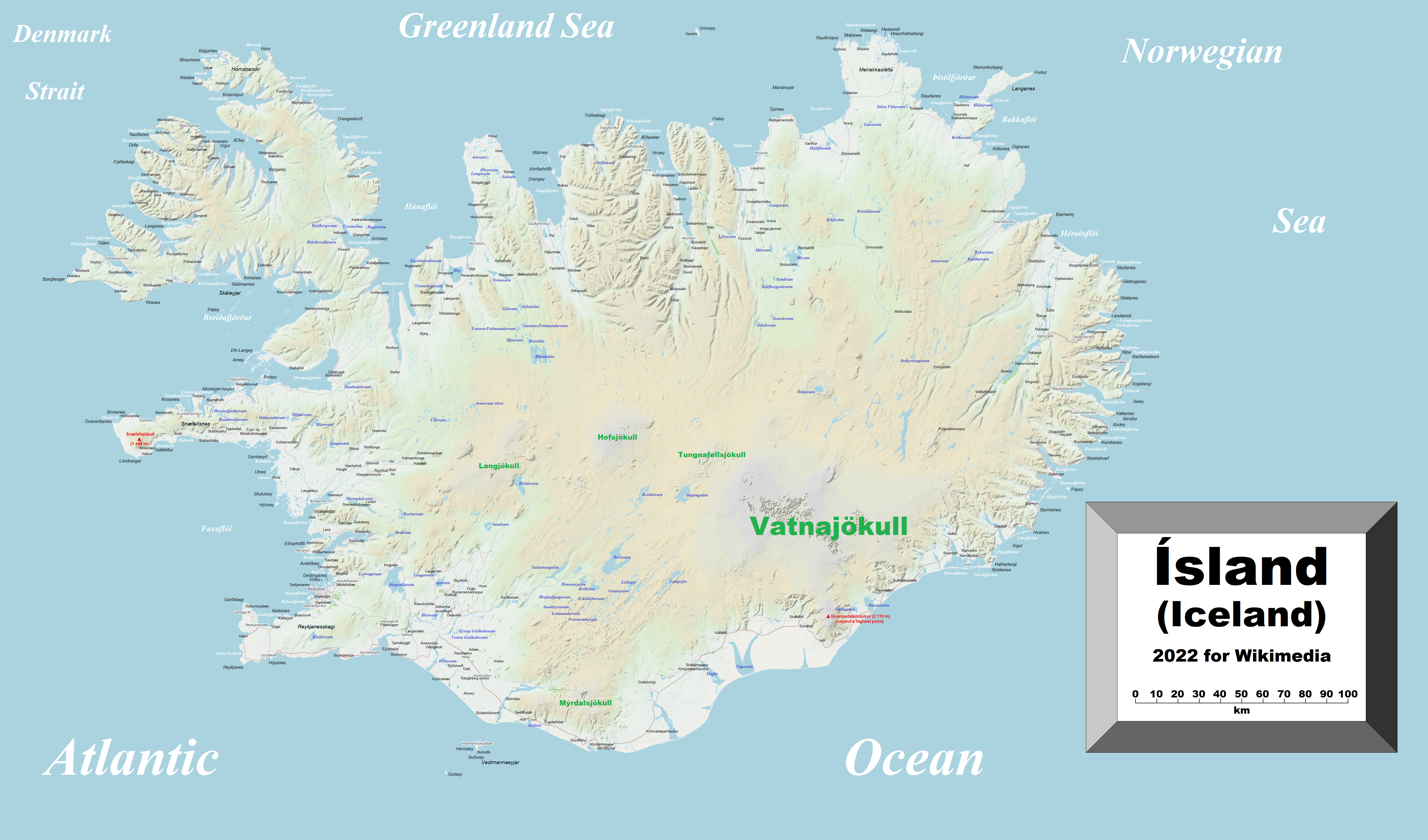
Map of Iceland, the Westfiords Peninsula to the north-west (enlargeable)

Hiss had not been briefed about the minefield, the diversion having not been planned before the convoy sailed. An hour later, Cubison estimated by taking soundings that he was at 66°45′N, 22°22′W, north-west of Straumnes. The ships turned south-west to a course of 222° to head for Straumnes Point, Hussar keeping behind Niger with the convoy in sight, as Niger advanced to reach the coast. At 10:00 p.m. the bridge crew saw what they thought was the North Cape at 150° land 1 nmi (1.9 km; 1.2 mi) ahead and ordered a turn to 270° (west) but they had seen an iceberg, that had been difficult to make out in the mist. After forty minutes, Niger ran into the minefield and exploded, 119 men of the 127 crew being killed.

Cubison had managed to signal to Hiss to turn back to a south-west course before he was killed and other ships set off mines. The merchant crews thought that they were being attacked by U-boats or bombarded by a surface raider. Hybert, Massmar, Heffron and Rodina were sunk, Exterminator and John Randolph were damaged. As the convoy was plunged into confusion, the surviving escorts possessed Admiralty charts showing the minefield and entered it to begin rescuing the survivors. The Free French Roselys (Lieutenant de vaissaeau A. Bergeret) stayed behind and searched the minefield for more than six hours, rescuing 179 men. The captain of Hussar had got a fix and with St Elstan and Lady Madeleine, guided the surviving ships southwards and arrived at Reykjavík on 7 July.

== Aftermath ==
=== Analysis ===
The Flag Officer Commanding, Iceland (C), Rear-Admiral Frederick Dalrymple-Hamilton, concluded that the catastrophe was caused by the late change of plan, putting Hiss into an impossible position about the conditions off north-west Iceland and no plan made by the Senior Officer escort and the convoy commodore (acting) about what to do if land was not sighted when expected to. Lacking a reliable fix for 72 hours and the error of mistaking an iceberg for land had caused the mistaken change in course. The radar carried by Niger and Hussar lacked reliability and there was no Direction finding (DF) beacon to guide ships between land and the minefield.

=== Casualties ===
Eight men in Niger survived and 119 men were killed, all of the complements of Exterminator, Hybert and Rodina survived, one man died abandoning Heffron, five men drowned when John Randolph broke in two and when Massmar sank, 17 sailors, 5 Naval Armed Guards and the 26 survivors on board from the sinking of Alamar in Convoy PQ 16 were killed, a loss of 173 men. The lost ships amounted to 38,306 GRT; John Randolf and Exterminator were later written off.

== Allied order of battle ==
=== Convoyed ships ===
Merchant ships (Note: A convoy had a standard formation of short columns, number 1 to port in the direction of travel. Each position in the column was numbered; 11 was the first ship in column 1 and 12 was the next ship in the column; 21 was the first ship in column 2.)
| Ship | Year | Flag | GRT | P'n | Notes |
|---|---|---|---|---|---|
| Alma Ata | 1920 | Soviet Union | 3,611 | 54 | Timber, cargo |
| American Press | 1920 | United States | 5,131 | 62 | |
| American Robin | 1919 | United States | 5,172 | 61 | |
| Archangelsk | 1929 | Soviet Union | 2,480 | 64 | Timber, cargo |
| Atlantic | 1939 | Merchant Navy | 5,414 | 81 | |
| Budenni | 1923 | Soviet Union | 2,482 | 43 | Timber, cargo |
| Capira | 1920 | Panama | 5,625 | 93 | |
| SS Chulmleigh | 1938 | Merchant Navy | 5,445 | 94 | |
| City of Omaha | 1920 | United States | 6,124 | 72 | |
| SS Empire Baffin | 1941 | Merchant Navy | 6,978 | 31 | |
| Empire Mavis | 1919 | Merchant Navy | 5,704 | 84 | |
| Empire Meteor | 1940 | Merchant Navy | 7,457 | 24 | |
| Empire Selwyn | 1941 | Merchant Navy | 7,167 | 51 | Convoy Commodore |
| Empire Stevenson | 1941 | Merchant Navy | 6,209 | 14 | Lumber, cargo |
| Exterminator | 1924 | Panama | 6,115 | 23 | 5 July, damaged minefield SN72, 66°34N, 23°14′W, scrapped Philadelphia |
| Heffron | 1919 | United States | 7,611 | 42 | 5 July, sunk on minefield SN72 66°34N, 23°14′W 1† 61 surv. |
| Hegira | 1919 | United States | 7,588 | 22 | |
| Hybert | 1920 | United States | 6,120 | 92 | 5 July, sunk on minefield SN72 66°34′N, 23°14′W 0†, 50 (+26 ex-Syros) surv |
| John Randolph | 1942 | United States | 7,191 | 13 | 5 July, sunk on minefield SN72 66°34N, 23°14′W |
| Komiles | 1932 | Soviet Union | 3,962 | 53 | Timber |
| Kuzbass | 1914 | Soviet Union | 3,109 | 34 | |
| Lancaster | 1918 | United States | 7,516 | 71 | |
| Massmar | 1920 | United States | 5,828 | 82 | 5 July, sunk on minefield SN72, 66°34′N, 23°14′W, 48† (inc.26† exAlamar) 42 surv. |
| Mauna Kea | 1919 | United States | 6,064 | 91 | |
| Michigan | 1919 | Panama | 5,594 | 41 | |
| Mormacrey | 1919 | United States | 5,946 | 11 | |
| Mount Evans | 1919 | Panama | 6,267 | 74 | |
| Nemaha | 1920 | United States | 6,501 | 21 | |
| Petrovski | 1921 | Soviet Union | 3,771 | 44 | Timber, cargo |
| Pieter de Hoogh | 1941 | Netherlands | 7,168 | 12 | |
| Richard Henry Lee | 1941 | United States | 7,191 | 32 | . |
| Rodina | 1922 | Soviet Union | 4,441 | 73 | 5 July, sunk on minefield SN72, 66°34′N, 23°14′W 0†, 25 |
| St. Clears | 1936 | Merchant Navy | 4,312 | 33 | |
| Stary Bolshevik | 1933 | Soviet Union | 3,974 | 52 | |
| Yaka | 1920 | United States | 5,432 | 83 | |

=== Escorts ===
Escort forces
| Ship | Flag | Class | Notes |
Eastern local escort
| Grozny | Soviet Navy | Gnevny-class destroyer | 26–28 June |
| Gremyaschi | Soviet Navy | Gnevny-class destroyer | 26–28 June |
| Kuibyshev | Soviet Navy | Gnevny-class destroyer | 26–28 June |
| HMS Bramble | Royal Navy | Halcyon-class minesweeper | 26–28 June |
| HMS Hazard | Royal Navy | Halcyon-class minesweeper | 26–28 June |
| HMS Leda | Royal Navy | Halcyon-class minesweeper | 26–28 June |
| HMS Seagull | Royal Navy | Halcyon-class minesweeper | 26–28 June |
Ocean escort
| HMS Alynbank | Royal Navy | Auxiliary AA cruiser | 26 June – 7 July |
| HMS Achates | Royal Navy | A-class destroyer | 26 June – 7 July |
| ORP Garland | Polish Navy | G-class destroyer | 26 June – 7 July |
| HMS Volunteer | Royal Navy | Modified W-class | 29 June – 7 July |
| HMS Intrepid | Royal Navy | I-class destroyer | 26 June – 3 July |
| HMS Intrepid | Royal Navy | I-class destroyer | 26 June – 3 July |
| HMS Niger | Royal Navy | Halcyon-class minesweeper | 26 June – 5 July |
| HMS Hussar | Royal Navy | Halcyon-class minesweeper | 26 June – 7 July |
| HMS Honeysuckle | Royal Navy | Flower-class corvette | 26 June – 7 July |
| HMS Hyderabad | Royal Navy | Flower-class corvette | 26 June – 7 July |
| HMS Roselys | Free French Naval Forces | Flower-class corvette | 26 June – 7 July |
| HMS Starwort | Royal Navy | Flower-class corvette | 26 June – 7 July |
| HMS Lady Madeline | Royal Navy | ASW trawler | 26 June – 7 July |
| HMS St Elstan | Royal Navy | ASW trawler | 26 June – 7 July |
| HMS Seawolf | Royal Navy | S-class submarine | 26 June – 1 July, det. to Convoy PQ 17 |
| HMS Trident | Royal Navy | T-class submarine | 26 June – 1 July, det. to Convoy PQ 17 |
Force Q (Fleet oiler and escort)
| RFA Gray Ranger | Royal Fleet Auxiliary | Ranger-class tanker | @ Jan Mayen for Convoy PQ 17, 2 July, att. Convoy QP 13 |
| HMS Douglas | Royal Navy | Scott-class destroyer | @ Jan Mayen for Convoy PQ 17, 2 July, att. Convoy QP 13 |
