= SS Chulmleigh =

British merchant ship lost on the Kola Run (1942)

History
- Name: SS Chulmleigh
- Owner: Dulverton Steam Ship Company Ltd. - W. J. Tatem Ltd., London (1938–1940); Atlantic Shipping & Trading Co. Ltd (1940–1942)
- Builder: William Pickersgill & Sons Ltd., Southwick
- Yard number: 238
- Launched: 8 December 1937
- Completed: May 1938
- Fate: Wrecked on 5 November 1942

General characteristics
- Tonnage: 5,445 gross register tons (GRT); 3,202 net register tons (NRT); 10,050 tons deadweight (DWT)
- Length: 447.2 ft (136.3 m)
- Beam: 56.2 ft (17.1 m)
- Draught: 25 ft 9 in (7.85 m)
- Installed power: 502 nhp
- Propulsion: 1 × 3 cylinder triple expansion steam engine (24, 40, 69 × 48in); 1 × screw
- Speed: 10.5 kn (19.4 km/h; 12.1 mph)

SS Chulmleigh was a British merchant ship of the mid-20th century. She was in service during the first years of the Second World War and was lost in November 1942 on Operation FB, a series of individual sailings from Iceland to northern Russia. The ship ran aground on Sørkapp at the south end of Svalbard. The survivors of the wreck underwent a six-week ordeal that only the master and eight crewmen survived, eventually to be rescued.

== Construction ==
Chulmleigh was built in 1938 by William Pickersgill & Sons Ltd. of Southwick for the Dulverton Steamship Co., one of W. J. Tatem's companies, registered in London and was intended for the movement of general cargo. She was 447 ft 2 in (136.30 m) long, with a beam of 56 ft 2 in (17.12 m) and a moulded depth of 25 ft 9 in (7.85 m) with a capacity of 5,445 GRT and 10,050 DWT. The ship was powered by a triple-expansion steam engine fed by two single-ended boilers, giving a maximum speed of 10.5 kn (19.4 km/h; 12.1 mph). She had a single deck, with a shelter deck and a cruiser stern. Chulmleigh was launched on 8 December 1937 and was completed in May 1938. Chulmleigh had the wireless call sign GJGM.

== Service history ==
Chulmleigh entered service in 1938 with Dulverton but was later transferred to Atlantic Shipping & Trading Co., another of Tatem's companies. The outbreak of the Second World War in September 1939 found her at Colón, Panama, having completed a voyage to British Columbia and was returning to the UK via the Caribbean. Following her return she undertook several long-haul voyages over the next two years. In October 1939 she departed the UK, travelling with Convoy OB 27 until dispersal for ports in South America; she returned in January 1940 with Convoy SL 18. After several coastal journeys she left the UK in March 1940 with Convoy OB 107 for North America, returning with Convoy HX 34 in April. In May 1940 Chulmleigh left with Convoy OB 155, joining Convoy OG 31 for West Africa and the South Atlantic, before arriving in Australia in August. She returned via the Cape and West Africa, joining Convoy SL 62 for passage back to the UK, and arriving in February 1941.

In March 1941 the ship loaded at South Shields for Takoradi with crated aircraft then sailed in Convoy OB 308 to Lagos, Accra and Freetown to take on cargo of cocoa beans, palm kernels and mahogany for Hull, returning with Convoy SL 77 in June. At Hull, military stores were loaded for Reykjavík in Iceland where it took six weeks to unload then sailed for New York and loaded for a voyage to northern Russia returning with Convoy SC 54 en route to Iceland with Lend-Lease cargo for the Soviet Union. In November 1941 she sailed with Convoy PQ 5 for Archangel, remaining ice-bound there throughout the winter. After the thaw Chulmleigh sailed for home with Convoy QP 13 in June 1942 carrying wood, goose feathers, pitch and arsenic. In September 1942 Chulmleigh returned to Iceland for further passage to the Soviet Union. After to the Convoy PQ 17 disaster, the losses to Convoy PQ 18 and the demands of Operation Torch (the Allied invasion of North Africa) Convoy PQ 19 was cancelled and she was selected for independent passage to Murmansk in Operation FB.

== Voyage ==
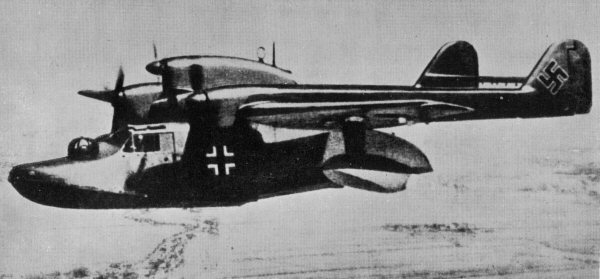
Blohm und Voss BV 138 reconnaissance flying boat

Operation FB was an attempt during the winter months of October to December 1942 to pass unescorted single ships with volunteer crews to north Russia. In November, SS Chulmleigh was routed north of Jan Mayen, then south of Svalbard to turn south towards the White Sea, on a voyage of 2,500 nmi (4,600 km; 2,900 mi). The captain was briefed to make haste to avoid interception and because Polar ice was accumulating and covering more of the Arctic Ocean. The captain was prevented from celestial navigation by unbroken cloud and snowfalls; only dead reckoning was available to time the turn off Jan Mayen at midnight on 3 November 1942. A quick star shot through a break in clouds revealed that the magnetic compass was 8° out. During the night, the radio officer reported distress signals from other ships making passage and early on 5 November, the Admiralty ordered the ship beyond 77° North, before heading for Svalbard. The captain delayed changing course for four hours, in the hope of another star shot; around noon the clouds broke and to the dismay of the crew, a Blohm & Voss BV 138 (BV 138) reconnaissance aircraft appeared.

Topographic map of Svalbard

The ship was turned south-east and in the snow and afternoon darkness, the captain feared that they might not pass Svalbard. At midnight the master felt that they were clear of the South Cape of Spitsbergen Island and turned east. There had been a dead reckoning error of 20 nmi (37 km; 23 mi) north and on 6 November, at 12:30 a.m., Chulmleigh ran onto a reef off the South Cape and grounded at the stern, the bow floating in deeper water beyond. The confidential books were jettisoned and the crew abandoned ship in haste but one of the four lifeboats was damaged and two men fell into the sea; one man was rescued but the other died of exposure. Two officers remained on board and after a couple of hours some of the crew re-boarded to try to manoeuvre the ship off the reef but the attempt failed. As the three boats reached open water, five Ju 88s bombed the ship and set it on fire; U-625 torpedoed the wreck later. (Note: The remains of the ship were still visible in 2004.)

At 4:00 a.m. a distress call was transmitted and the crew waited in the lifeboats for twilight, the lightest conditions that occurred at that time of year, to negotiate the reefs around the ship. The boats made sail along the west coast of Spitsbergen for Barentsburg in Isfjorden 150 nmi (280 km; 170 mi) to the north. The smallest boat was judged unseaworthy and soon abandoned; the occupants had to squeeze aboard the remaining two boats, making 28 men in one and 29 in the other. The boats became separated in the dark but continued north during 7 November. A storm blew up on 8 November and the crews began to succumb to hypothermia. On 10 November, a crewman died of the cold; in better visibility, the coast was sighted again and at 3:00 a.m. on 12 November, one boat crew got ashore in Isfjorden. Several attempts to find help failed in the winter blizzards and the crew were only discovered by two Norwegian ski troops from Gearbox II on 2 January 1943 despite Barentsburg being only 12 mi (19 km) from the landfall. Only the captain and eight members of the crew survived to be repatriated to Thurso in Scotland on 15 June 1943.
