= German submarine U-625 =

German World War II submarine

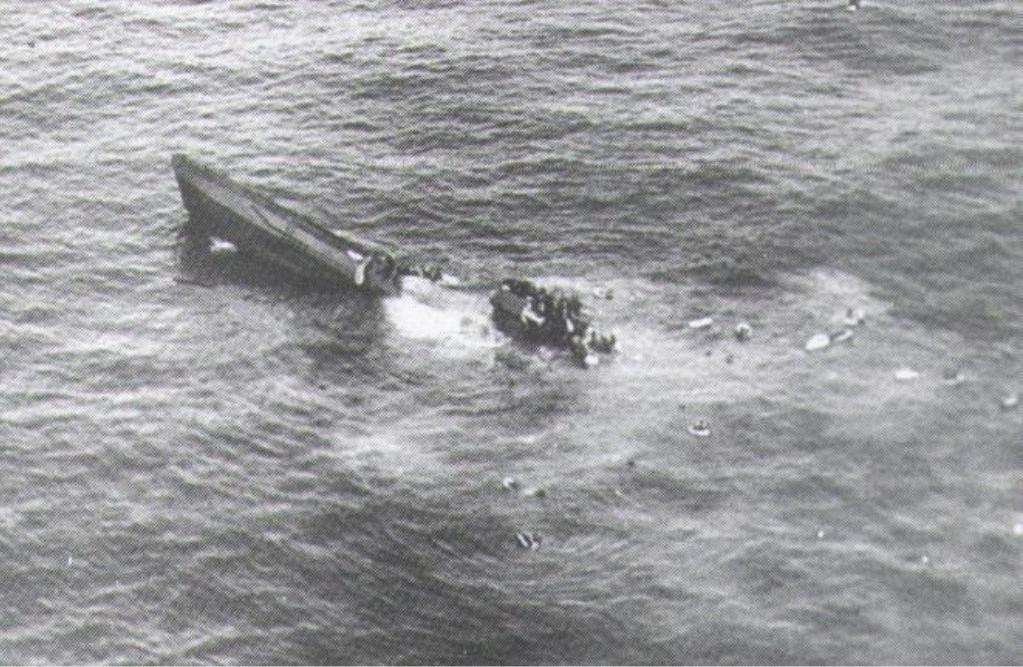
- The U-625 sinking, after being attacked

History

Nazi Germany
- Name: U-625
- Ordered: 15 August 1940
- Builder: Blohm & Voss, Hamburg
- Yard number: 601
- Laid down: 28 July 1941
- Launched: 15 April 1942
- Commissioned: 4 June 1942
- Fate: Sunk on 10 March 1944

General characteristics
- Class & type: Type VIIC submarine
- Displacement: 769 tonnes (757 long tons) surfaced; 871 t (857 long tons) submerged
- Length: 67.10 m (220 ft 2 in) o/a; 50.50 m (165 ft 8 in) pressure hull
- Beam: 6.20 m (20 ft 4 in) o/a; 4.70 m (15 ft 5 in) pressure hull
- Height: 9.60 m (31 ft 6 in)
- Draught: 4.74 m (15 ft 7 in)
- Installed power: 2,800–3,200 PS (2,100–2,400 kW; 2,800–3,200 bhp) (diesels); 750 PS (550 kW; 740 shp) (electric)
- Propulsion: 2 shafts; 2 × diesel engines; 2 × electric motors
- Speed: 17.7 knots (32.8 km/h; 20.4 mph) surfaced; 7.6 knots (14.1 km/h; 8.7 mph) submerged
- Range: 8,500 nmi (15,700 km; 9,800 mi) at 10 knots (19 km/h; 12 mph) surfaced; 80 nmi (150 km; 92 mi) at 4 knots (7.4 km/h; 4.6 mph) submerged
- Test depth: 230 m (750 ft); Crush depth: 250–295 m (820–968 ft)
- Complement: 4 officers, 40–56 enlisted
- Armament: 5 × 53.3 cm (21 in) torpedo tubes (four bow, one stern); 14 × torpedoes or 26 TMA mines; 2 x AA guns (upper tower deck) : double-barrel 2 cm FlaK 38 MII on double-LM43U mounts; 1 x cannon (lower wintergarten deck) : 3.7 cm automatic M42U cannon on gun-carriage LM42U

Service record
- Part of: 8th U-boat Flotilla; 4 June – 30 September 1942; 3rd U-boat Flotilla; 1 – 31 October 1942; 11th U-boat Flotilla; 1 November 1942 – 31 May 1943; 13th U-boat Flotilla; 1 June – 31 October 1943; 1st U-boat Flotilla; 1 November 1943 – 10 March 1944
- Identification codes: M 04 401
- Commanders: Kptlt. Hans Benker; 4 June 1942 – 2 January 1944; Oblt.z.S. Kurt Sureth; 2 – 25 January 1944; Oblt.z.S. Siegfried Straub; 26 January – 10 March 1944
- Operations: 10 patrols: 1st patrol: a. 4 – 29 November 1942; b. 30 November – 2 December 1942; c. 23 – 25 December 1942; 2nd patrol: a. 30 December 1942 – 6 February 1943; b. 7 – 11 February 1943; 3rd patrol: 17 March – 16 April 1943; 4th patrol: a. 26 April – 31 May 1943; b. 10 – 11 June 1943; 5th patrol: a. 21 – 28 June 1943; b. 29 – 30 June 1943; 6th patrol: a. 12 – 27 July 1943; b. 4 – 5 August 1943; c. 5 – 6 August 1943; 7th patrol: a. 7 – 20 August 1943; b. 21 – 23 August 1943; 8th patrol: 4 – 8 November 1943; 9th patrol: a. 15 November 1943 – 2 January 1944; b. 2 – 6 January 1944; 10th patrol: 29 February – 10 March 1944
- Victories: 3 merchant ships sunk (18,751 GRT); 2 auxiliary warships sunk (1,129 GRT)

German submarine U-625 was a Type VIIC U-boat of the Nazi German Kriegsmarine during World War II. The submarine was laid down on 28 July 1941 at the Blohm & Voss yard in Hamburg, launched on 15 April 1942 and commissioned on 4 June 1942 under the command of Oberleutnant zur See Hans Benker.

After training with the 8th U-boat Flotilla, U-625 was transferred to the 3rd U-boat Flotilla for front-line service on 1 October 1942. She was soon transferred again, to the 11th U-boat Flotilla on 1 November 1942, then again to the 13th U-boat Flotilla on 1 June 1943, and finally to the 1st U-boat Flotilla on 1 November 1943.

U-625 completed ten patrols, torpedoed three merchant ships, and sank two auxiliary warships with mines. The boat was sunk on 10 March 1944 off the west coast of Ireland by depth charges from a Canadian Sunderland, EK591 "2U" from No. 422 Squadron RCAF.

== Design ==
German Type VIIC submarines were preceded by the shorter Type VIIB submarines. U-625 had a displacement of 769 tonnes (757 long tons) when at the surface and 871 tonnes (857 long tons) while submerged. She had a total length of 67.10 m (220 ft 2 in), a pressure hull length of 50.50 m (165 ft 8 in), a beam of 6.20 m (20 ft 4 in), a height of 9.60 m (31 ft 6 in), and a draught of 4.74 m (15 ft 7 in). The submarine was powered by two Germaniawerft F46 four-stroke, six-cylinder supercharged diesel engines producing a total of 2,800 to 3,200 metric horsepower (2,060 to 2,350 kW; 2,760 to 3,160 shp) for use while surfaced, two Brown, Boveri & Cie GG UB 720/8 double-acting electric motors producing a total of 750 metric horsepower (550 kW; 740 shp) for use while submerged. She had two shafts and two 1.23 m (4 ft) propellers. The boat was capable of operating at depths of up to 230 metres (750 ft).

The submarine had a maximum surface speed of 17.7 knots (32.8 km/h; 20.4 mph) and a maximum submerged speed of 7.6 knots (14.1 km/h; 8.7 mph). When submerged, the boat could operate for 80 nautical miles (150 km; 92 mi) at 4 knots (7.4 km/h; 4.6 mph); when surfaced, she could travel 8,500 nautical miles (15,700 km; 9,800 mi) at 10 knots (19 km/h; 12 mph). U-625 was fitted with five 53.3 cm (21 in) torpedo tubes (four fitted at the bow and one at the stern), fourteen torpedoes, two twin-barrel anti-aircraft guns on the tower upper deck (double 2 cm FlaK 38 MII on double-LM43U mounts), and a single cannon on the lower wintergarten deck (3,7 cm automatic M42U on LM42U carriage). The boat had a complement of between forty-four and sixty.

== Service history ==
=== First patrol ===
U-625 left Kiel on 1 October 1942 and sailed to Skjomenfjord, before commencing her first war patrol on 4 November. She sailed north to the waters south and east of Spitsbergen, where she sank three ships.

Her first victim was the 5,445 GRT British merchant ship Chulmleigh. On 5 November the unescorted vessel had been bombed and damaged by a German Ju 88 aircraft of II./KG 30 (based at Banak, North Cape) and had beached at South Cape, Spitsbergen. The following day, 6 November, at 15:58, U-625 torpedoed the stranded vessel and then wrecked her with gunfire. The crew abandoned ship and landed on an isolated part of the island. They were not rescued until 4 January, by men from the garrison at Barentsburg. Only the master, three crewmen and nine gunners survived, while 36 crewmen members and nine gunners were lost, many to frostbite.

At 22:24 the same day, 6 November, she torpedoed and sank the unescorted 7,455 GRT British merchant ship Empire Sky south of Spitsbergen. The master and 40 crew members were lost.

On 23 November, at 00:56, U-625 torpedoed the 5,851 GRT British merchant ship Goolistan of Convoy QP-15, west of Bear Island. The U-boat hit the ship with another torpedo at 01:18, and she sank at 01:45. The master and 41 crewmen were lost.

U-625 arrived at Narvik on 29 November 1942 after 26 days at sea.

=== Second to fifth patrols ===
U-625's next four patrols in the waters north of Norway, between December 1942 and June 1943, were uneventful, and she had no successes.

=== Sixth patrol ===
U-625 sailed from Trondheim on 12 July 1943, and headed north and then east into Soviet waters. On 20 July she laid mines in the Yugorsky Strait. On 25 July at 01:40, the 557 tons Soviet naval trawler T-904 (No. 58) struck a mine, which exploded under the boiler room, and sank the ship within two minutes. Ten of her crew of 45 were lost. The U-boat arrived in Narvik on 27 July after a 16-day patrol.

=== Seventh patrol ===
The U-boat returned to the Kara Sea to lay more mines, sailing from Hammerfest on 7 August, and returning to Narvik on the 20th. At 18:07 on 25 August the 572 tons Soviet Navy salvage vessel ASO-1 Shkval, struck two mines laid by U-625 in the Yugorsky Strait and sank immediately. Only five of her crew of 52 survived.

=== Eight and ninth patrols ===
Her next patrol from Trondheim and lasting from 4 to 8 November, was uneventful. U-625 departed Trondheim again on 15 November 1943 and headed out into the northern Atlantic, south of Greenland. Having no success, she finally set a course for Brest, France. At 21:38 on 2 January 1944, in the Bay of Biscay, the U-boat was attacked by a Leigh light equipped British B-24 Liberator bomber from No. 224 Squadron RAF. U-625 opened fire with her AA guns and scored a hit, wounding the B-24 radio operator. The U-boat then began to crash-dive. The commander Kapitänleutnant Hans Benker cancelled the order so that he and a crewman could recover the Naxos wire, but the boat continued to dive and Benker and the crewman were killed. The U-boat arrived at Brest on 6 January.

=== Tenth patrol and loss ===
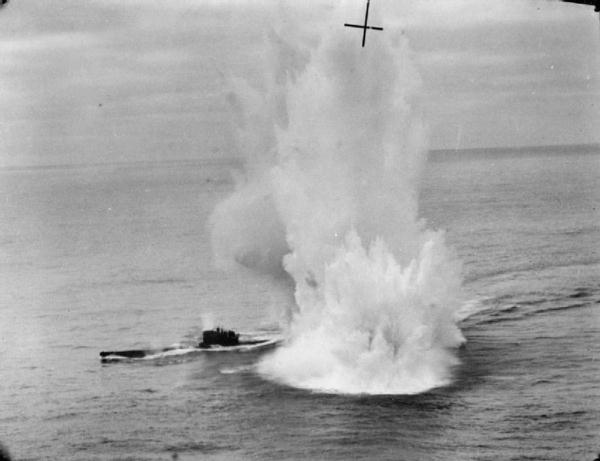
EK591's stick of six depth charges straddled U-625 on their first pass.

The U-boat, now under the command of Oberleutnant zur See Siegfried Straub, left Brest on 29 February 1944 on her tenth and final patrol. On 10 March, west of Ireland, in position 52°35′N 20°19′W, she was sunk by depth charges from a Canadian Sunderland flying boat, EK591 "2U", from No. 422 Squadron RCAF and all 53 hands were lost.

The crew of the Canadian amphibious plane, the Sunderland, reported that it had sunk a German U-boat off the west coast of Ireland and that the crew were swimming around in the water. Pictures of the attack & sinking of U-625, and of some of the crew that escaped in liferafts (not all), were taken by the cameras aboard the Sunderland. The plane circled a few times and headed back to its home base. None of the submarine crew survived; before having a chance to be rescued, they were lost in high seas. Those pictures hung in the office of Sir Winston Churchill for a period during the war; it was the only confirmed proof of a U-boat "kill" by a Canadian coastal squadron during World War II. U-625 was one of 543 German ships that went lost together with its entire crew.

(Neitzel & Welzer 2012:261, with two photos on p. 262 of U-625 being attacked and about half of the crew clustered together in the water in one-man rafts.)

Source: Neitzel, Sonke & Welzer, Harald 2012 Soldaten - On Fighting, Killing, and Dying: The Secret World War II Transcripts of German POWs. Translated from the German by Jefferson Chase. Scribe: Melbourne.

=== Wolfpacks ===
U-625 took part in nine wolfpacks

- Boreas (19–28 November 1942)
- Nordwind (24 January – 4 February 1943)
- Eisbär (27 March – 15 April 1943)
- Coronel (4–8 December 1943)
- Coronel 1 (8–14 December 1943)
- Coronel 2 (14–17 December 1943)
- Föhr (18–23 December 1943)
- Rügen 6 (23–28 December 1943)
- Preussen (7–10 March 1944)

== Summary of raiding history ==
Ships sunk or damaged
Date	Name	Flag	GRT	Fate
6 November 1942	Chulmleigh	Merchant Navy	5,445	Sunk
6 November 1942	Empire Sky	Merchant Navy	7,455	Sunk
23 November 1942	Goolistan	Merchant Navy	5,851	Sunk
25 July 1943	T-904	Soviet Navy	557	Sunk (mine)
25 August 1943	ASO-1 Shkval	Soviet Navy	572	Sunk (mine)

== Bibliography ==
- Busch, Rainer; Röll, Hans-Joachim (1999). German U-boat commanders of World War II : a biographical dictionary. Translated by Brooks, Geoffrey. London, Annapolis, Md: Greenhill Books, Naval Institute Press. ISBN 1-55750-186-6.
- Busch, Rainer; Röll, Hans-Joachim (1999). Der U-Boot-Krieg, 1939-1945: Deutsche U-Boot-Verluste von September 1939 bis Mai 1945 [German U-boat losses from September 1939 to May 1945] (in German). Vol. IV. Hamburg, Berlin, Bonn: Mittler. ISBN 3-8132-0514-2.
- Gröner, Eric; Jung, Dieter; Maass, Martin (1991). German Warships 1815-1945: U-boats and Mine Warfare Vessels. Vol. 2. Translated by Thomas, Keith; Magowan, Rachel. London: Conway Maritime Press. ISBN 0-85177-593-4.
- Bishop, Chris (2006). Kriegsmarine U-Boats, 1939-45. London: Amber Books. ISBN 978-1-904687-96-2.
