= SS John H. B. Latrobe =

Liberty ship of WWII

History

United States
- Name: John H. B. Latrobe
- Namesake: John H. B. Latrobe
- Owner: War Shipping Administration (WSA)
- Operator: Calmar Steamship Corp.
- Ordered: as type (EC2-S-C1) hull, MCE hull 52
- Awarded: 14 March 1941
- Builder: Bethlehem-Fairfield Shipyard, Baltimore, Maryland
- Cost: $1,075,921
- Yard number: 2039
- Way number: 5
- Laid down: 19 May 1942
- Launched: 13 July 1942
- Sponsored by: Miss Doreen Frances Almond
- Completed: 28 July 1942
- Identification: Call sign: KGBL
- Fate: Laid up in the James River Reserve Fleet, Lee Hall, Virginia, 8 October 1947; Laid up in the Suisun Bay Reserve Fleet, Suisun Bay, California, 14 May 1952; Sold for scrapping, 15 April 1969, withdrawn from fleet, 1 May 1969

General characteristics
- Class & type: Liberty ship; type EC2-S-C1, standard
- Tonnage: 10,865 LT DWT; 7,176 GRT
- Displacement: 3,380 long tons (3,434 t) (light); 14,245 long tons (14,474 t) (max)
- Length: 441 feet 6 inches (135 m) oa; 416 feet (127 m) pp; 427 feet (130 m) lwl
- Beam: 57 feet (17 m)
- Draft: 27 ft 9.25 in (8.4646 m)
- Installed power: 2 × Oil fired 450 °F (232 °C) boilers, operating at 220 psi (1,500 kPa); 2,500 hp (1,900 kW)
- Propulsion: 1 × triple-expansion steam engine, (manufactured by Worthington Pump & Machinery Corp, Harrison, New Jersey); 1 × screw propeller
- Speed: 11.5 knots (21.3 km/h; 13.2 mph)
- Capacity: 562,608 cubic feet (15,931 m^{3}) (grain); 499,573 cubic feet (14,146 m^{3}) (bale)
- Complement: 38–62 USMM; 21–40 USNAG
- Armament: Varied by ship; Bow-mounted 3-inch (76 mm)/50-caliber gun; Stern-mounted 4-inch (102 mm)/50-caliber gun; 2–8 × single 20-millimeter (0.79 in) Oerlikon anti-aircraft (AA) cannons and/or, 2–8 × 37-millimeter (1.46 in) M1 AA guns

SS John H. B. Latrobe was a Liberty ship built in the United States during World War II. She was named after John H. B. Latrobe, an American lawyer and inventor. He invented the Latrobe Stove, also known as the "Baltimore Heater", a coal fired parlor heater made of cast iron that fit into fireplaces as an insert.

== Construction ==
John H. B. Latrobe was laid down on 19 May 1942, under a Maritime Commission (MARCOM) contract, MCE hull 52, by the Bethlehem-Fairfield Shipyard, Baltimore, Maryland; she was sponsored by Miss Doreen Frances Almond, the daughter of H.L. Almond technical representative of the British Ministry of War Transport, and was launched on 13 July 1942.

== History ==
She was allocated to Calmar Steamship Corp., on 28 July 1942. On 8 October 1947, she was Laid up in the James River Reserve Fleet, Lee Hall, Virginia. On 14 May 1952, she was laid up in the Suisun Bay Reserve Fleet, Suisun Bay, California. She was sold for nontransportation use on 15 April 1969, to Zidell Explorations, Inc. She was withdrawn from the fleet on 1 May 1969.

== Bibliography ==
- "Bethlehem-Fairfield, Baltimore MD". www.ShipbuildingHistory.com. 14 August 2008.
- Maritime Administration. "John H. B. Latrobe". Ship History Database Vessel Status Card. U.S. Department of Transportation, Maritime Administration.
- Davies, James (May 2004). "Specifications (As-Built)" (PDF). p. 23.
- "SS John H. B. Latrobe".
