= SS John Walker =

Liberty ship of WWII

History

United States
- Name: John Walker
- Namesake: John Walker
- Owner: War Shipping Administration (WSA)
- Operator: United Fruit Co.
- Ordered: as type (EC2-S-C1) hull, MCE hull 305
- Awarded: 1 May 1941
- Builder: Bethlehem-Fairfield Shipyard, Baltimore, Maryland
- Cost: $1,088,696
- Yard number: 2055
- Way number: 15
- Laid down: 1 June 1942
- Launched: 22 July 1942
- Sponsored by: Mrs. Arthur J. Williams
- Completed: 30 July 1942
- Identification: Call sign: KFJH
- Fate: Laid up in the James River Reserve Fleet, Lee Hall, Virginia, 11 March 1946; Sold for scrapping, 14 March 1961, withdrawn from fleet, 17 April 1961

General characteristics
- Class & type: Liberty ship; type EC2-S-C1, standard
- Tonnage: 10,865 LT DWT; 7,176 GRT
- Displacement: 3,380 long tons (3,434 t) (light); 14,245 long tons (14,474 t) (max)
- Length: 441 feet 6 inches (135 m) oa; 416 feet (127 m) pp; 427 feet (130 m) lwl
- Beam: 57 feet (17 m)
- Draft: 27 ft 9.25 in (8.4646 m)
- Installed power: 2 × Oil fired 450 °F (232 °C) boilers, operating at 220 psi (1,500 kPa); 2,500 hp (1,900 kW)
- Propulsion: 1 × triple-expansion steam engine, (manufactured by General Machinery Corp., Hamilton, Ohio); 1 × screw propeller
- Speed: 11.5 knots (21.3 km/h; 13.2 mph)
- Capacity: 562,608 cubic feet (15,931 m^{3}) (grain); 499,573 cubic feet (14,146 m^{3}) (bale)
- Complement: 38–62 USMM; 21–40 USNAG
- Armament: Varied by ship; Bow-mounted 3-inch (76 mm)/50-caliber gun; Stern-mounted 4-inch (102 mm)/50-caliber gun; 2–8 × single 20-millimeter (0.79 in) Oerlikon anti-aircraft (AA) cannons and/or, 2–8 × 37-millimeter (1.46 in) M1 AA guns

SS John Walker was a Liberty ship built in the United States during World War II. She was named after John Walker, a representative of the House of Burgesses. He was in the Continental Army, serving in 1777 as an aide-de-camp to General George Washington, holding the rank of colonel. In 1780, he was elected as a delegate to the Continental Congress. He then studied law. When William Grayson died in 1790, Walker was appointed to the United States Senate to serve from March 31 to November 9.

== Construction ==
John Walker was laid down on 1 June 1942, under a Maritime Commission (MARCOM) contract, MCE hull 305, by the Bethlehem-Fairfield Shipyard, Baltimore, Maryland; she was sponsored by Mrs. Arthur J. Williams, the wife of the assistant secretary for MARCOM, and was launched on 22 July 1942.

== History ==
She was allocated to United Fruit Co., on 30 July 1942. On 11 March 1946, she was laid up in the James River Reserve Fleet, Lee Hall, Virginia. On 14 March 1961, she was sold for scrapping to Schiavone Bonomo Corp., for $56,411. She was removed from the fleet on 17 April 1961.

== Bibliography ==
- "Bethlehem-Fairfield, Baltimore MD". www.ShipbuildingHistory.com. 14 August 2008.
- Maritime Administration. "John Walker". Ship History Database Vessel Status Card. U.S. Department of Transportation, Maritime Administration.
- Davies, James (May 2004). "Specifications (As-Built)" (PDF). p. 23.
- "SS John Walker".
