= HMS Garland (H37) =

G-class destroyer

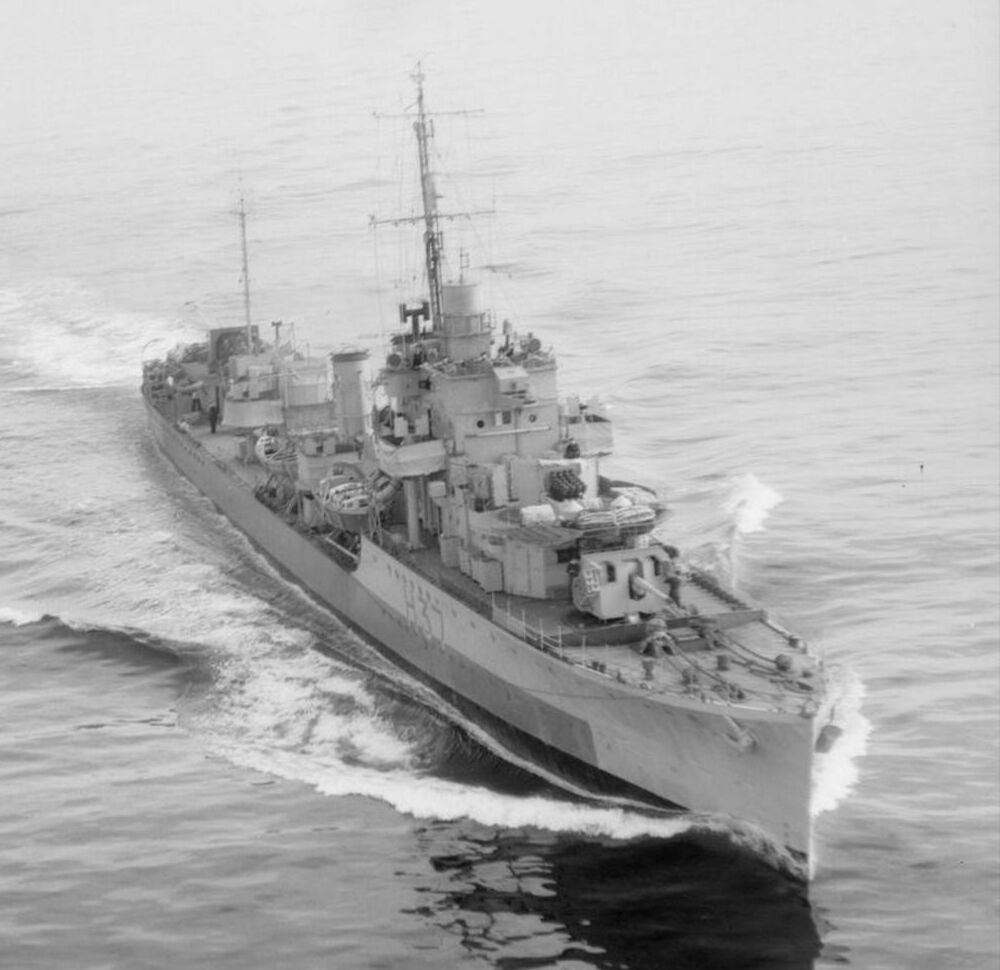
- Aerial view of ORP Garland in 1945

History

United Kingdom
- Name: Garland
- Builder: Fairfield Shipbuilding and Engineering, Govan
- Laid down: 22 August 1934
- Launched: 24 October 1935
- Completed: 3 March 1936
- Identification: Pennant number: H37
- Fate: Loaned to Polish Navy, 3 May 1940

Poland
- Name: Garland
- Acquired: 3 May 1940
- Commissioned: 3 May 1940
- Decommissioned: 24 September 1946
- Fate: Returned to Royal Navy, 24 September 1946

United Kingdom
- Name: Garland
- Acquired: 23 July 1946
- Decommissioned: 23 July 1946
- Fate: Sold to Royal Netherlands Navy, 14 November 1946

Netherlands
- Name: Garland
- Acquired: 14 November 1946
- Decommissioned: 31 January 1964
- Renamed: Marnix, 16 January 1950
- Fate: Scrapped

General characteristics as built
- Class & type: G-class destroyer
- Displacement: 1,350 long tons (1,370 t) (standard); 1,883 long tons (1,913 t) (deep load)
- Length: 323 ft (98.5 m)
- Beam: 33 ft (10.1 m)
- Draught: 12 ft 5 in (3.8 m)
- Installed power: 3 Admiralty 3-drum boilers; 34,000 shp (25,000 kW)
- Propulsion: 2 shafts, 2 geared steam turbines
- Speed: 36 knots (67 km/h; 41 mph)
- Range: 5,530 nmi (10,240 km; 6,360 mi) at 15 knots (28 km/h; 17 mph)
- Complement: 137 (peacetime), 146 (wartime)
- Sensors & processing systems: ASDIC
- Armament: 4 × single 4.7 in (120 mm) guns; 2 × quadruple 0.5 in (12.7 mm) machine guns; 2 × quadruple 21 in (533 mm) torpedo tubes; 20 × depth charges, 1 rail and 2 throwers

HMS Garland, also known by her Polish designation ORP Garland, was a G-class destroyer built for the Royal Navy in the mid-1930s. During the Spanish Civil War of 1936–1939 the ship spent considerable time in Spanish waters, enforcing the arms blockade imposed by Britain and France on both sides of the conflict. Shortly after World War II began, she was badly damaged by the premature explosion of her own depth charges and required over six months of repairs. Before these were completed, Garland was loaned to the Polish Navy in May 1940. The ship was assigned to the Mediterranean Fleet afterwards and escorted convoys there before being assigned to the Western Approaches Command in September for escort duties. She escorted a convoy from Gibraltar to Malta during Operation Halberd in September 1941 and escorted Convoy PQ 16 from Iceland to Murmansk in May 1942. She was badly damaged by a near miss from a German bomber during that operation and required three months of repairs.

Garland was then assigned to the Mid-Ocean Escort Force in the North Atlantic until December 1943, when she was transferred to Freetown, Sierra Leone, to escort convoys off West Africa. In April 1944, the ship was transferred to back to the Mediterranean Fleet where she escorted convoys. She sank one German submarine in September before returning to the UK for a lengthy refit that lasted until March 1945. Garland was then assigned to the Western Approaches Command, but carried emergency supplies to coastal towns in Belgium and the Netherlands immediately after the war ended in May. She was paid off and reclaimed from the Polish Navy in July 1946. In mid-November that same year, she was sold to the Royal Netherlands Navy for use as a school ship. Garland was refitted as an anti-submarine training ship in 1948 and renamed Marnix in 1950. Reclassified as a frigate in 1952, the ship was not decommissioned until 1964 and scrapped afterwards.

== Description ==
Garland displaced 1,350 long tons (1,370 t) at standard load and 1,883 long tons (1,913 t) at deep load. The ship had an overall length of 323 feet (98.5 m), a beam of 33 feet (10.1 m) and a draught of 12 feet 5 inches (3.8 m). She was powered by Parsons geared steam turbines, driving two shafts, which developed a total of 34,000 shaft horsepower (25,000 kW) and gave a maximum speed of 36 knots (67 km/h; 41 mph). Steam for the turbines was provided by three Admiralty 3-drum boilers. Garland carried a maximum of 470 long tons (480 t) of fuel oil that gave her a range of 5,530 nautical miles (10,240 km; 6,360 mi) at 15 knots (28 km/h; 17 mph). The ship's complement was 137 officers and men in peacetime, but in increased to 146 in wartime.

The ship mounted four 45-calibre 4.7-inch Mk IX guns in single mounts, designated 'A', 'B', 'X', and 'Y' from front to rear. For anti-aircraft (AA) defence, Garland had two quadruple Mark I mounts for the 0.5 inch Vickers Mk III machine gun. She was fitted with two above-water quadruple torpedo tube mounts for 21-inch torpedoes. One depth charge rail and two throwers were fitted; 20 depth charges were originally carried, but this increased to 35 shortly after the war began. By mid-1940, this had increased to 44 depth charges.

=== Wartime modifications ===
Most ships of Garland's class had the rear torpedo tubes replaced by a 12-pounder AA gun after the evacuation of Dunkirk in 1940, but it is not known exactly when this modification was made. By 1942, the ship's short range AA armament had been augmented by two Oerlikon 20 mm cannons on her searchlight platform and another pair on the wings of the ship's bridge. 'Y' gun was also removed to allow her depth charge stowage to be increased. The .50-calibre machine gun mounts were replaced by a pair of Oerlikons later. The ship's director-control tower and rangefinder above the bridge were removed in exchange for a Type 271 target indication radar, after 1942, and 'B' gun was replaced by a Hedgehog anti-submarine spigot mortar. A Type 286 short-range surface search radar was probably also fitted mid-way through the war. The ship also received a HF/DF radio direction finder mounted on a pole mainmast.

== History ==
=== HMS Garland, 1936–1940 ===
Ordered on 5 March 1934 from Fairfield Shipbuilding and Engineering, Garland was laid down at Govan, Scotland, on 22 August 1934. She was launched on 24 October 1935 and completed on 3 March 1936. Excluding government-furnished equipment like the armament, the ship cost £250,664. She was assigned to the 1st Destroyer Flotilla of the Mediterranean Fleet upon commissioning. Garland took part in the evacuation of British and foreign nationals from Barcelona and other Spanish coastal ports at the start of the Spanish Civil War, and patrolled Spanish waters during the war, enforcing the edicts of the Non-Intervention Committee in 1937 and 1938. The ship was overhauled at Sheerness between 24 May and 5 July 1937 and 31 May to 28 July 1938 during which her low-pressure turbines were repaired. Garland patrolled off Cyprus in July 1939.

When World War II began, the ship was en route to Alexandria from Aden and arrived there on 6 September. Whilst escorting a convoy to Malta, some of her depth charges detonated prematurely on 17 September and badly damaged the aft end of the ship. Garland had to be towed back to Alexandria where temporary repairs were made. She was towed to Malta for permanent repairs which lasted from 11 October to 8 May 1940. Shortly before the completion of the repairs, she was loaned to the Polish Navy on 3 May 1940, the anniversary of the 1791 Polish Constitution of 3 May.

=== ORP Garland, 1940–1946 ===
After working up, the ship escorted a convoy to and from Greece in late June 1940. During Operation Hats, Garland was lightly damaged by Italian aircraft on 31 August whilst escorting a convoy to Malta. She was transferred to the Western Approaches Command in mid-September and was assigned to the 10th Escort Group. On 13 November, Garland was badly damaged by storm whilst escorting the battleship Revenge and required over a month to make repairs. Two men were lost overboard during the storm. In early January 1941, the ship was fitted with a new ASDIC system. She was transferred to the 14th Escort Group in April and was then briefly attached to the Home Fleet, escorting a tanker, during the Allied landing on Spitsbergen in July. Upon her return, Garland was assigned to Escort Group B3 for escort duties in the North Atlantic.

In late September, she joined the Polish-manned destroyer Piorun in Operation Halberd, escorting a large convoy to Malta. The two ships escorted the battleship Nelson back to Gibraltar after she had been torpedoed during the operation. Garland then rejoined Escort Group B3. The ship was refitted between 28 February and 5 May 1942 in Middlesbrough and was assigned to escort Convoy PQ 16 in late May after working up. On 27 May, a bomb was dropped by a Junkers Ju 88 bomber 10 yards (9.1 m) off the starboard side of the ship, that decimated the crews of 'A' and 'B' guns and the starboard Oerlikon and .50-calibre machine guns (22 killed and 37 wounded). The ship's fire-control director and rangefinder were destroyed and she was ordered to proceed independently to Murmansk for temporary repairs. These took over a month to complete and Garland sailed on 4 July for Troon, as part of the escort for Convoy QP 13, for permanent repairs that were not completed until 21 September.

The ship rejoined Escort Group B3 until she began a lengthy refit in May 1943 that lasted until 8 September. Garland was assigned to the 8th Support Group after working up and escorted several small convoys transporting Allied troops to the Azores to build airbases after the Portuguese gave their consent in late September. From November to April 1944, the ship was based in Freetown to escort convoys between Freetown and Gibraltar. In May she was assigned to the 14th Destroyer Flotilla of the Mediterranean Fleet where she escorted convoys and supported Allied operations in the Aegean. On 19 September 1944, together with two other British destroyers, she sank the German submarine U-407 off Santorini. The following month Garland supported the Allied liberation of Greece after the German withdrawal.

On 20 November, the ship sailed for the UK to begin a lengthy refit at Devonport that lasted until 31 March 1945. She was assigned to the 8th Destroyer Flotilla in the Western Approaches Command, but had barely finished working up when the war ended in May. The ship transported emergency supplies to Belgium and the Netherlands immediately afterwards. At the end of 1945, Garland took part in Operation Deadlight, the scuttling of captured German U-boats. In early 1946, the ship patrolled Norwegian waters and then was assigned to the Polish Squadron at Rosyth through June. In late July she was ordered to be paid off and the loan terminated. The ship was disarmed in late August before entering Category C reserve.

=== HNLMS Marnix, 1946–1964 ===
On 14 November 1946, Garland was sold "as is" to the Royal Netherlands Navy for £9,000 and was initially used as a school ship. She was refurbished in 1948 as an anti-submarine training ship. This is probably when Garland was rearmed with two 105-millimetre (4.1 in) anti-aircraft guns in 'A' and 'X' positions, a Hedgehog in 'B' position and six 20-millimetre Oerlikons. She carried four depth charge throwers and two depth charge rails. The ship was renamed HNLMS Marnix on 16 January 1950 and made port visits in southern British ports the following March. Marnix was reclassified as a frigate in 1952 and received a thorough overhaul in 1955–56. She was decommissioned on 31 January 1964 and later scrapped.
