= SS Richard H. Alvey =

Liberty ship of WWII

History

United States
- Name: Richard H. Alvey
- Namesake: Richard H. Alvey
- Owner: War Shipping Administration (WSA)
- Operator: A.H. Bull & Co., Inc.
- Ordered: as type (EC2-S-C1) hull, MCE hull 53
- Awarded: 14 March 1941
- Builder: Bethlehem-Fairfield Shipyard, Baltimore, Maryland
- Cost: $1,079,705
- Yard number: 2040
- Way number: 3
- Laid down: 24 May 1942
- Launched: 15 July 1942
- Sponsored by: Mrs. Holbrooke Bradley
- Completed: 29 July 1942
- Identification: Call sign: KGIM
- Fate: Laid up in the National Defense Reserve Fleet, Beaumont, Texas, 29 September 1947; Sold for scrapping, 14 March 1961, withdrawn from fleet, 29 March 1961

General characteristics
- Class & type: Liberty ship; type EC2-S-C1, standard
- Tonnage: 10,865 LT DWT; 7,176 GRT
- Displacement: 3,380 long tons (3,434 t) (light); 14,245 long tons (14,474 t) (max)
- Length: 441 feet 6 inches (135 m) oa; 416 feet (127 m) pp; 427 feet (130 m) lwl
- Beam: 57 feet (17 m)
- Draft: 27 ft 9.25 in (8.4646 m)
- Installed power: 2 × Oil fired 450 °F (232 °C) boilers, operating at 220 psi (1,500 kPa); 2,500 hp (1,900 kW)
- Propulsion: 1 × triple-expansion steam engine, (manufactured by Worthington Pump & Machinery Corp, Harrison, New Jersey); 1 × screw propeller
- Speed: 11.5 knots (21.3 km/h; 13.2 mph)
- Capacity: 562,608 cubic feet (15,931 m^{3}) (grain); 499,573 cubic feet (14,146 m^{3}) (bale)
- Complement: 38–62 USMM; 21–40 USNAG
- Armament: Varied by ship; Bow-mounted 3-inch (76 mm)/50-caliber gun; Stern-mounted 4-inch (102 mm)/50-caliber gun; 2–8 × single 20-millimeter (0.79 in) Oerlikon anti-aircraft (AA) cannons and/or, 2–8 × 37-millimeter (1.46 in) M1 AA guns

SS Richard H. Alvey was a Liberty ship built in the United States during World War II. She was named after Richard H. Alvey, an American jurist who served as Chief Judge of the supreme court of the State of Maryland, the Maryland Court of Appeals and subsequently served as the Chief Justice of the Court of Appeals of the District of Columbia.

== Construction ==
Richard H. Alvey was laid down on 24 May 1942, under a Maritime Commission (MARCOM) contract, MCE hull 53, by the Bethlehem-Fairfield Shipyard, Baltimore, Maryland; she was sponsored by Mrs. Holbrooke Bradley, the daughter of Paul Patterson, the owner of The Baltimore Sun, and was launched on 15 July 1942.

== History ==
She was allocated to A.H. Bull & Co., Inc., on 29 July 1942. On 29 September 1947, she was laid up in the National Defense Reserve Fleet, Beaumont, Texas. She was sold for scrapping on 14 March 1961, to Luria Brothers & Co., for $61,789.22. She was withdrawn from the fleet on 29 March 1961.

== Bibliography ==
- "Bethlehem-Fairfield, Baltimore MD". www.ShipbuildingHistory.com. 14 August 2008.
- Maritime Administration. "Richard H. Alvey". Ship History Database Vessel Status Card. U.S. Department of Transportation, Maritime Administration.
- Davies, James (May 2004). "Specifications (As-Built)" (PDF). p. 23.
- "SS Richard H. Alvey".
