= Convoy PQ 7 =

- Part of Arctic Convoys of the Second World War
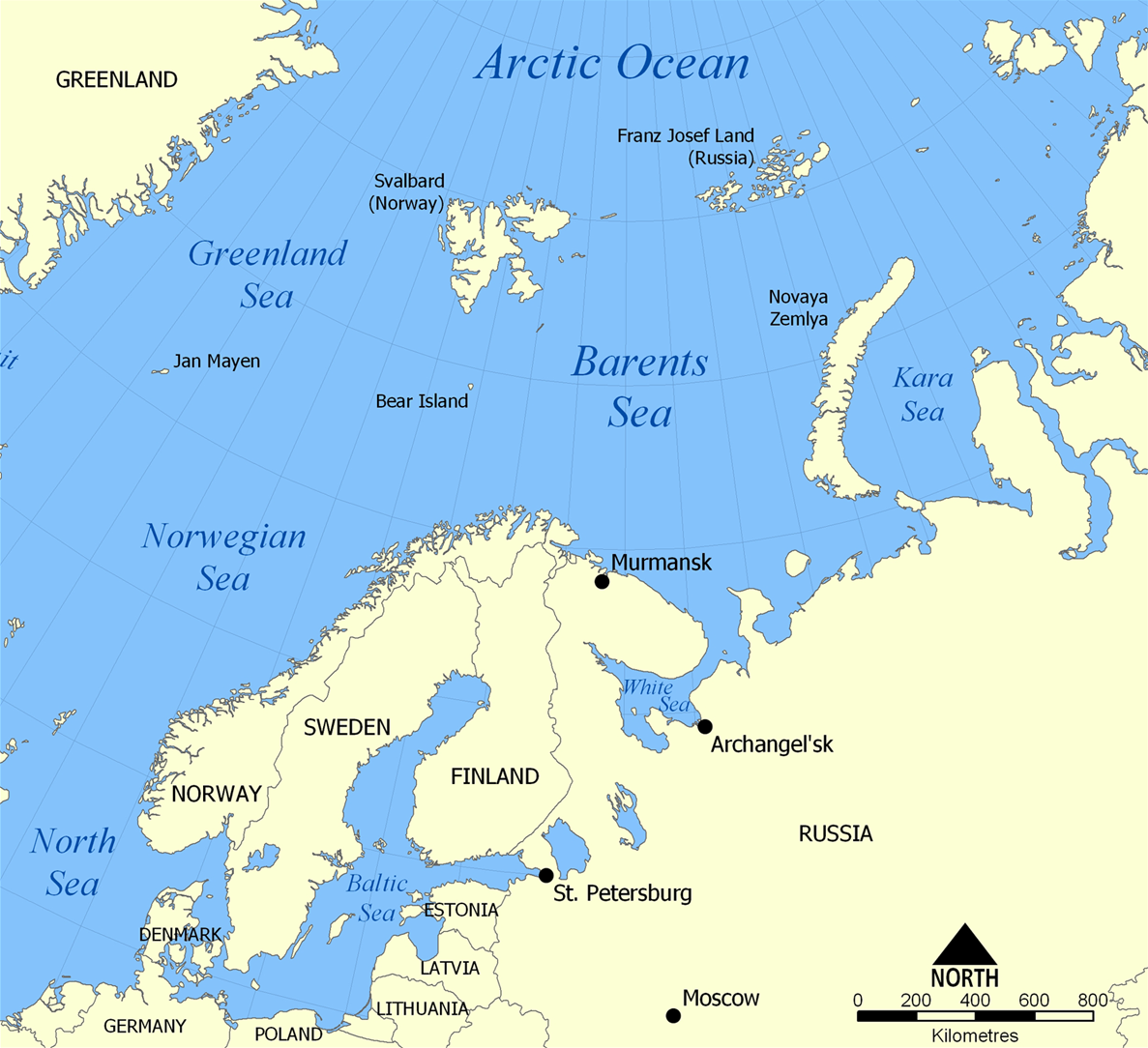
- Site of the Arctic convoys
Date
Location
- PQ 7a: 26 December 1941 – 12 January 1942
- PQ 7b: 31 December 1941 – 11 January 1942
The Norwegian Sea and the Barents Sea

Belligerents
Royal Navy; Merchant Navy; Panama	Kriegsmarine; Luftwaffe

Strength
PQ 7a: 2 ships; PQ 7b: 9 ships	1 U-boat

Casualties and losses
1 Merchant ship	

Convoy PQ 7 (26 December 1941 – 11 January 1942) was the eighth of the Arctic convoys of the Second World War by which the Western Allies supplied equipment, weapons, munitions and raw materials to the Soviet Union, after the invasion of 22 June 1941 by Nazi Germany. To keep to the departure schedule, the convoy was split and the first two ships sailed as Convoy PQ 7a, departing from Hvalfjörður in Iceland on 26 December 1941.

By 1 January 1942, between Bjørnøya (Bear Island) and the North Cape (Nordkapp) the ships laboured through an Arctic storm, thick ice and an easterly gale, making slow progress. At 4:00 p.m. Cold Harbor lost contact with Waziristan and they made their way independently. Around 7:00 a.m. on 2 December, Waziristan was torpedoed by U-134 and sank with the loss of all 47 men. Cold Harbor reached Murmansk on 12 January 1942, a day after Convoy PQ 7b.

Convoy PQ 7b, sailed from Hvalfjörður on 31 December 1941, comprising nine merchant vessels. The Icelandic local escort consisted of the anti-submarine warfare trawlers HMT Cape Argona and HMT Wastwater. On 4 January, the oceanic escort, the destroyers HMS Icarus and Tartar, joined but HMS Cumberland, the cruiser escort, failed to rendezvous with the convoy and made a solo passage to Murmansk. The ships arrived on 11 January 1942 without loss.

== Background ==
=== Lend-lease ===
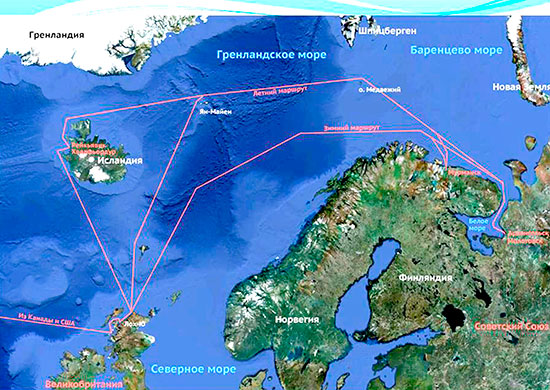
Russian map showing Arctic convoy routes from Britain and Iceland, past Norway to the Barents Sea and northern Russian ports

After Operation Barbarossa, the German invasion of the USSR, began on 22 June 1941, the UK and USSR signed an agreement in July that they would "render each other assistance and support of all kinds in the present war against Hitlerite Germany". Before September 1941 the British had dispatched 450 aircraft, 22,000 long tons (22,000 t) of rubber, 3,000,000 pairs of boots and stocks of tin, aluminium, jute, lead and wool. In September British and US representatives travelled to Moscow to study Soviet requirements and their ability to meet them. The representatives of the three countries drew up a protocol in October 1941 to last until June 1942 and to agree new protocols to operate from 1 July to 30 June of each following year until the end of Lend-Lease. The protocol listed supplies, monthly rates of delivery and totals for the period.

The supplies to be sent were specified but not the ships to move them. The USSR turned out to lack the ships and escorts and the British and Americans, who had made a commitment to "help with the delivery", undertook to deliver the supplies for want of an alternative. The main Soviet need in 1941 was military equipment to replace losses because, at the time of the negotiations, two large aircraft factories were being moved east from Leningrad and two more from Ukraine. It would take at least eight months to resume production, until when, aircraft output would fall from 80 to 30 aircraft per day. Britain and the US undertook to send 400 aircraft a month, at a ratio of three bombers to one fighter (later reversed) 500 tanks a month and 300 Bren gun carriers. The Anglo-Americans also undertook to send 42,000 long tons (43,000 t) of aluminium and 3,862 machine tools, with sundry raw materials, food and medical supplies.

=== British grand strategy ===
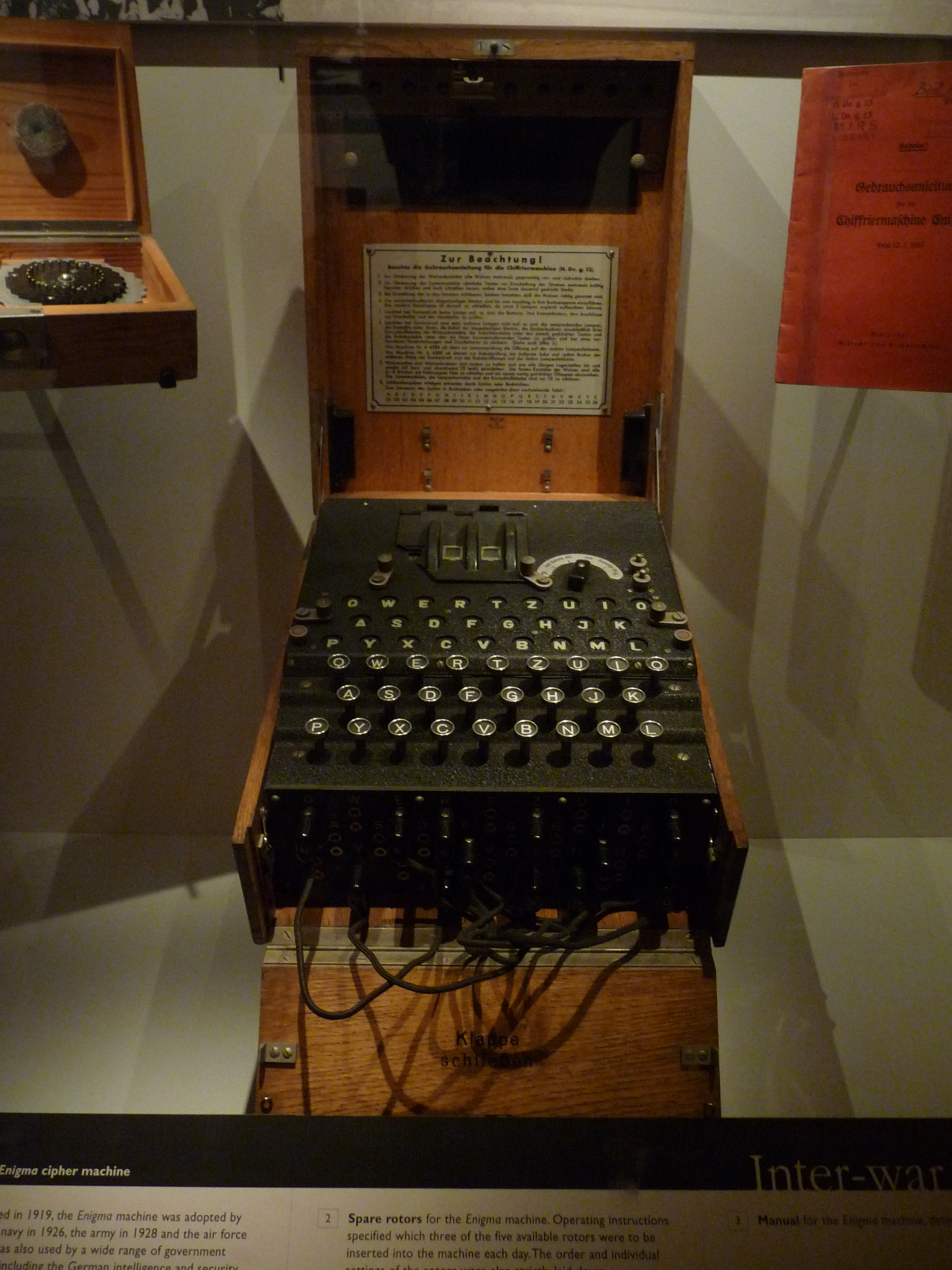
An Enigma coding machine

The growing German air strength in Norway and increasing losses to convoys and their escorts, led Rear-Admiral Stuart Bonham Carter, commander of the 18th Cruiser Squadron, Admiral Sir John Tovey, Commander in Chief Home Fleet and Admiral Sir Dudley Pound the First Sea Lord, the professional head of the Royal Navy, unanimously to advocate the suspension of Arctic convoys during the summer months.

==== Bletchley Park ====
The British Government Code and Cypher School (GC&CS) based at Bletchley Park housed a small industry of code-breakers and traffic analysts. By June 1941, the German Enigma machine Home Waters (Heimish) settings used by surface ships and U-boats could quickly be read. On 1 February 1942, the Enigma machines used in U-boats in the Atlantic and Mediterranean were changed but German ships and the U-boats in Arctic waters continued with the older Heimish (Hydra from 1942, Dolphin to the British). By mid-1941, British Y-stations were able to receive and read Luftwaffe W/T transmissions and give advance warning of Luftwaffe operations. In 1941, naval Headache personnel with receivers to eavesdrop on Luftwaffe wireless transmissions were embarked on warships.

==== B-Dienst ====
The rival German Beobachtungsdienst (B-Dienst, Observation Service) of the Kriegsmarine Marinenachrichtendienst (MND, Naval Intelligence Service) had broken several Admiralty codes and cyphers by 1939, which were used to help Kriegsmarine ships elude British forces and provide opportunities for surprise attacks. From June to August 1940, six British submarines were sunk in the Skaggerak using information gleaned from British wireless signals. In 1941, B-Dienst read signals from the Commander in Chief Western Approaches informing convoys of areas patrolled by U-boats, enabling the submarines to move into "safe" zones. B-Dienst broke Naval Cypher No 3 in February 1942 and by March was reading up to 80 per cent of the traffic. By coincidence, the British lost access to Atlantic U-boat communications with the introduction of the Shark cypher and had no information to send in Cypher No 3 which might compromise Ultra.

=== Arctic Ocean ===
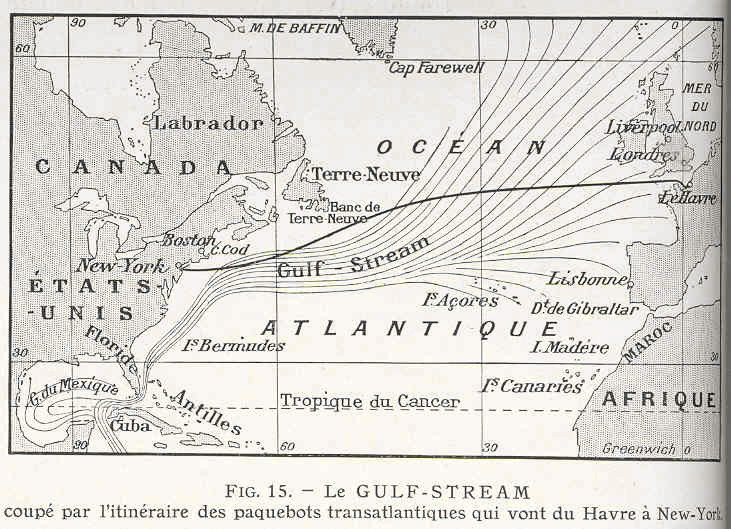
Diagrammatic representation of the course of the Gulf Stream

Between Greenland and Norway are some of the most stormy waters of the world's oceans, 890 mi (1,440 km) of water under gales full of snow, sleet and hail. The cold Arctic water is met by the Gulf Stream, warm water from the Gulf of Mexico, which becomes the North Atlantic Drift. Arriving at the south-west of England the drift moves between Scotland and Iceland; north of Norway the drift splits. One stream bears north of Bear Island to Svalbard and a southern stream follows the coast of Murmansk into the Barents Sea. The mingling of cold Arctic water and warmer water of higher salinity generates thick banks of fog for convoys to hide in but the waters drastically reduced the effectiveness of ASDIC as U-boats moved in waters of differing temperatures and density.

In winter, polar ice can form as far south as 50 mi (80 km) off the North Cape and in summer it can recede to Svalbard. The area is in perpetual darkness in winter and permanent daylight in the summer and can make air reconnaissance almost impossible. Around the North Cape and in the Barents Sea the sea temperature rarely rises about 4° Celsius and a person in the water will die unless rescued immediately. The cold water and air makes spray freeze on the superstructures of ships, which has to be removed quickly to prevent ships becoming top-heavy. Conditions in U-boats were, if anything, worse, the boats having to submerge in warmer water to rid the superstructure of ice. Crewmen on watch were exposed to the elements, oil lost its viscosity, nuts froze and sheared off. Heaters in the hull were too demanding of current to be run continuously.

== Prelude ==
=== Kriegsmarine ===
German naval forces in Norway were commanded by Hermann Böhm, the Kommandierender Admiral Norwegen. Two U-boats were based in Norway in July 1941, four in September, five in December and four in January 1942. By mid-February twenty U-boats were anticipated in the region, with six based in Norway, two in Narvik or Tromsø, two at Trondheim and two at Bergen. Hitler contemplated establishing a unified command but decided against it. The German battleship Tirpitz arrived at Trondheim on 16 January, the first ship of a general transfer of surface ships to Norway. British convoys to Russia had received little attention, since they averaged only eight ships each and the long Arctic winter nights negated even the limited Luftwaffe effort that was available.

=== Luftflotte 5 ===
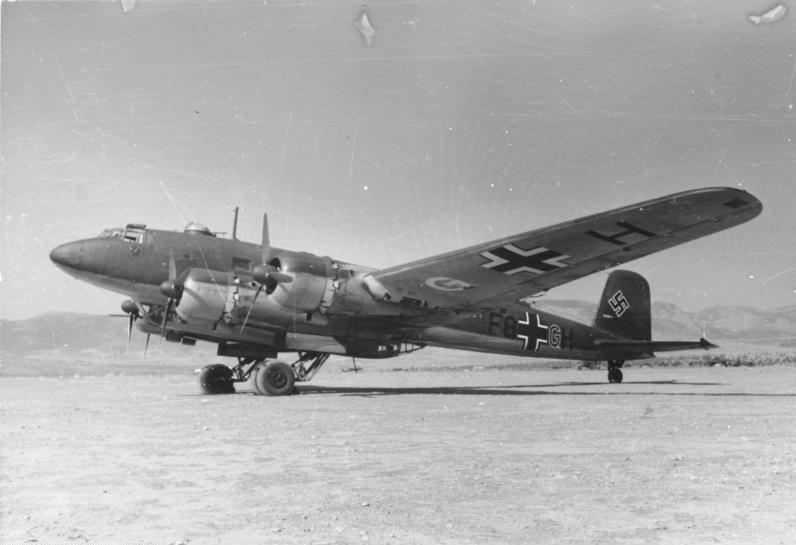
A Focke-Wulf Fw 200 Kondor of KG 40

In mid-1941, Luftflotte 5 (Air Fleet 5) had been re-organised for Operation Barbarossa when Luftgau Norwegen (Air Region Norway) was headquartered in Oslo. Fliegerführer Stavanger (Air Commander Stavanger) the centre and north of Norway, Jagdfliegerführer Norwegen (Fighter Leader Norway) commanded the fighter force and Fliegerführer Kerkenes (Oberst [colonel] Andreas Nielsen) in the far north had airfields at Kirkenes and Banak. The Air Fleet had 180 aircraft, sixty of which were reserved for operations on the Karelian Front against the Red Army. The distance from Banak to Arkhangelsk was 560 mi (900 km) and Fliegerführer Kerkenes had only ten Junkers Ju 88 bombers of Kampfgeschwader 30, thirty Stukas, ten Messerschmitt Bf 109 fighters of Jagdgeschwader 77, five Messerschmitt Bf 110 heavy fighters of Zerstörergeschwader 76, ten reconnaissance aircraft and an anti-aircraft battalion.

Sixty aircraft were far from adequate in such a climate and terrain where "there is no favourable season for operations" (Earl F. Ziemke). The emphasis of air operations changed from army support to anti-shipping operations as Allied Arctic convoys became more frequent. Hubert Schmundt, the Admiral Nordmeer noted gloomily on 22 December 1941 that the number long-range reconnaissance aircraft was exiguous and from 1 to 15 December only two Ju 88 sorties had been possible. After the Lofoten Raids (Operation Claymore) Schmundt wanted Luftflotte 5 to transfer aircraft to northern Norway but its commander, Generaloberst Hans-Jürgen Stumpff, was reluctant to deplete the defences of western Norway. Despite this some air units were transferred, a catapult ship (Katapultschiff), MS Schwabenland, was sent to northern Norway and Heinkel He 115 floatplane torpedo-bombers, of Küstenfliegergruppe 1./406 was transferred to Sola. By the end of 1941, III Gruppe, KG 30 had been transferred to Norway and in the new year, another Staffel of Focke-Wulf Fw 200 Kondors from Kampfgeschwader 40 (KG 40) had arrived. Luftflotte 5 was also expected to receive a gruppe, comprising three Staffeln (squadrons) of Heinkel He 111 torpedo-bombers.

==== Air-sea rescue ====
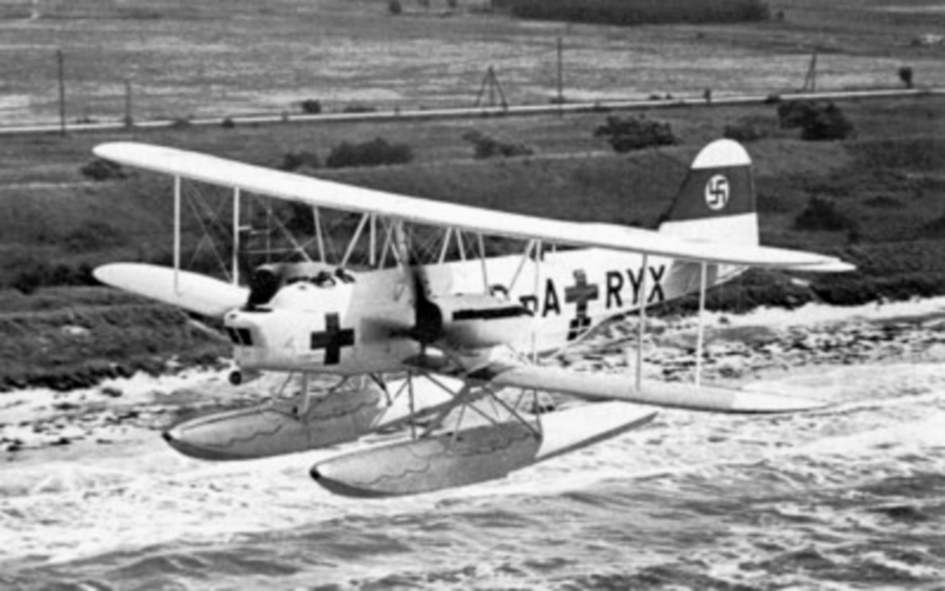
Example of a Heinkel He 59 search and rescue aircraft (1940)

The Luftwaffe Sea Rescue Service (Seenotdienst) along with the Kriegsmarine, the Norwegian Society for Sea Rescue (RS) and ships on passage, recovered aircrew and shipwrecked sailors. The service comprised Seenotbereich VIII at Stavanger, covering Bergen and Trondheim with Seenotbereich IX at Kirkenes for Tromsø, Billefjord and Kirkenes. Co-operation was as important in rescues as it was in anti-shipping operations if people were to be saved before they succumbed to the climate and severe weather.

The sea rescue aircraft comprised Heinkel He 59 floatplanes with Dornier Do 18 and Dornier Do 24 seaplanes. Oberkommando der Luftwaffe (OKL, the high command of the Luftwaffe) was not able to increase the number of search and rescue aircraft in Norway, due to a general shortage of aircraft and crews, despite Stumpff pointing out that coming down in such cold waters required extremely swift recovery and that his crews "must be given a chance of rescue" or morale could not be maintained.

=== Arctic convoys ===
A convoy was defined as at least one merchant ship sailing under the protection of at least one warship. At first the British had intended to run convoys to Russia on a forty-day cycle (the number of days between convoy departures) during the winter of 1941–1942 but this was shortened to a ten-day cycle. The round trip to Murmansk for warships was three weeks and each convoy needed a cruiser and two destroyers, which severely depleted the Home Fleet. Convoys left port and rendezvoused with the escorts at sea. A cruiser provided distant cover from a position to the west of Bear Island. Air support was limited to 330 Squadron and 269 Squadron, RAF Coastal Command from Iceland, with some help from anti-submarine patrols from Sullom Voe, in Shetland, along the coast of Norway. Anti-submarine trawlers escorted the convoys on the first part of the outbound journey. Built for Arctic conditions, the trawlers were coal-burning ships with sufficient endurance. The trawlers were commanded by their peacetime crews and captains with the rank of Skipper, Royal Naval Reserve (RNR), who were used to Arctic conditions, supplemented by anti-submarine specialists of the Royal Naval Volunteer Reserve (RNVR). British minesweepers based at Arkhangelsk met the convoys to join the escort for the remainder of the voyage.

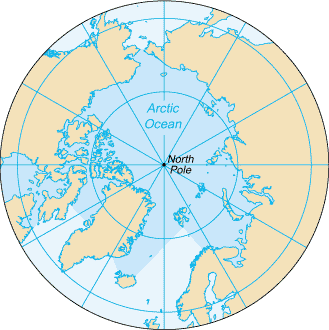
Diagram of the Arctic Ocean

By late 1941, the convoy system used in the Atlantic had been established on the Arctic run; a convoy commodore briefed the ships' masters and signals officers on arrangements for the management of the convoy, that sailed in a formation of long rows of short columns. Convoy commodores were usually retired naval officers or members of the Royal Naval Reserve, whose merchant ships flew a white pendant with a blue cross for identification. The commodore was assisted by a Naval signals party of four men, who used lamps, semaphore flags and telescopes to pass signals in code. Codebooks were carried in a weighted bag which was to be dumped overboard to prevent capture. In large convoys, the commodore had a vice- and rear-commodore with whom he directed the speed, course and zig-zagging of the merchant ships and liaised with the escort commander.

In October 1941, the Prime Minister, Winston Churchill, had promised an Arctic convoy to the USSR every ten days. The unloading capacity of Arkhangelsk was 300,000 long tons (300,000 t), Vladivostok (Pacific Route) 140,000 long tons (140,000 t) and 60,000 long tons (61,000 t) in the Persian Gulf (for the Persian Corridor route) ports. The first convoy was due at Murmansk around 12 October and the next convoy was to depart Iceland on 22 October. A motley of British, Allied and neutral shipping, loaded with military stores and raw materials for the Soviet war effort would be assembled at Hvalfjörður (Hvalfiord) in Iceland, convenient for ships from both sides of the Atlantic. In winter, due to the polar ice expanding southwards, the convoy route ran closer to Norway. The voyage was between 1,400 and 2,000 nmi (2,600 and 3,700 km; 1,600 and 2,300 mi) each way, taking at least three weeks for a round trip.

== Voyages ==
=== Convoy PQ 7a ===
On 26 December 1941, Convoy PQ 7a sailed from Hvalfjörður on the west coast of Iceland. The convoy consisted of two merchant ships, the Panamanian SS Cold Harbor and the British SS Waziristan, that was the first British ship to embark military stores in the US bound for the Soviet Union. Waziristan detached from Convoy SC 60 with two ships bound for Reykjavík, with two trawler escorts. Even with only Waziristan and Cold Harbour ready to sail, they departed from Hvalfjörður with the armed trawlers HMT Hugh Walpole and HMT Ophelia from 26–27 December. The ships were due to rendezvous with the Halcyon-class minesweepers HMS Britomart and Salamander, that were en route to the USSR but the minesweepers failed to rendezvous by the time that the local escorts had turned back. By 1 January 1942, between Bjørnøya (Bear Island) and the North Cape (Nordkapp) the ships laboured through an Arctic storm, thick ice and an easterly gale, making slow progress. At 4:00 p.m. Cold Harbor lost contact with Waziristan and they made their way independently. Around 7:00 a.m. on 2 December, Waziristan was torpedoed by U-134 and sank with the loss of all 47 men. Cold Harbor reached Murmansk on 12 January 1942.

=== Convoy PQ 7b ===
The delayed part of Convoy PQ 7, Convoy PQ 7b sailed from Hvalfjörður on 31 December 1941, comprising nine merchant vessels, two Panamanian, one Russian and seven British. The Icelandic local escort consisted of the Anti-submarine warfare trawlers HMT Cape Argona and HMT Wastwater from 31 December – 4 January. The oceanic escort was provided by the destroyers HMS Icarus and HMS Tartar from 4 to 11 January but HMS Cumberland, the County-class cruiser escort, failed to rendezvous with the convoy and made a solo passage to Murmansk. The ships arrived safely on 11 January 1942.

== Allied order of battle ==
=== Freighters of Convoy PQ 7a ===
Merchant ships
Ship	Year	Flag	GRT	Notes
SS Cold Harbor	1920	Panama	5,010	
SS Waziristan	1924	United Kingdom	5,135	Stranded in ice, sunk 74°09′N, 19°10′E, U-134 and aircraft, 47† 0 surv

=== Escorts ===
Convoy escorts
Ship	Flag	Type	Notes
Western Local Escort
HMT Hugh Walpole	Royal Navy	Anti-submarine trawler	26–27 December
HMT Ophelia	Royal Navy	Shakespearian-class trawler	26–27 December
Oceanic escort (failed to rendezvous)
HMS Britomart	Royal Navy	Halcyon-class minesweeper	Sailed independently
HMS Salamander	Royal Navy	Halcyon-class minesweeper	Sailed independently

=== Merchant ships of Convoy PQ 7b ===
Convoyed ships
Ship	Year	Flag	GRT	Notes
SS Aneroid	1917	Panama	5,074	
SS Botavon	1912	Merchant Navy	5,848	
SS Chernyshevski	1919	Soviet Union	3,588	
SS Empire Activity	1919	Merchant Navy	5,335	
SS Empire Halley	1941	Merchant Navy	7,168	
SS Empire Howard	1941	Merchant Navy	6,985	
SS Empire Redshank	1919	Merchant Navy	6,615	
SS Jutland	1928	Merchant Navy	6,153	
SS Reigh Count	1907	Panama	4,657	

=== Escorts ===
Convoy escorts
Ship	Flag	Type	Notes
Western Local Escort
HMT Cape Argona	Royal Navy	ASW trawler	31 December – 4 January
HMT Wastwater	Royal Navy	ASW trawler	31 December – 4 January
Ocean escort
HMS Tartar	Royal Navy	Tribal-class destroyer	4–11 January
HMS Icarus	Royal Navy	I-class destroyer	4–11 January
Failed to rendezvous
HMS Cumberland	Royal Navy	County-class cruiser	Sailed independently

== German order of battle ==
U-boat Wolfpack (25 December 1941 – 19 January 1942)
Boat	Flag	Class	Notes
Gruppe Uhlan
U-134	Kriegsmarine	Type VIIC submarine	2 December, sank Waziristan
U-454	Kriegsmarine	Type VIIC submarine	
U-584	Kriegsmarine	Type VIIC submarine	
