= SS Dekabrist =

SS Dekabrist was a Russian steamship, built in 1903 and immediately converted to an armed merchant cruiser. She served in the Russo-Japanese War, World War I, the Russian Civil War, and World War II. She was sunk in 1942.

== History ==
Dekabrist was launched as Franche Comte at the Vickers Maxim shipyard in Barrow-in-Furness, Great Britain for M. le Boule of Le Havre on 2 October 1902, but remained at Barrow after her completion in April 1903. She was sold in secret to the Imperial Russian Navy and sailed from Barrow in April 1904, ostensibly bound for France, but was next reported at Libau under the name Anadyr, where she was outfitted as an auxiliary cruiser for the Russo-Japanese War. She was armed with 8x57mm cannon and had a crew of 16 officers and 245 men. From Libau, she sailed with the Second Pacific Squadron for the Far East. When leaving Tangier after a coaling stop her anchor became caught on a telegraph cable and she was ordered to cut the cable to continue. Anadyr was present at the Battle of Tsushima, where she rescued survivors from the auxiliary cruiser Ural, and escaped to Russia via Madagascar.

During World War I, Anadyr again served in the Imperial Russian Navy. In March 1918, pro-Soviet crewmen took over the ship on behalf of the Bolshevik government. In 1920, she served as a merchant ship with Transbalt. In 1921, she was again employed as a warship against the Whites.

1n 1922 she returned to merchant service as Dekabrist, operating from Vladivostok.

In 1940 Dekabrist was used briefly as transport for Polish POWs from Vladivostok to Magadan en route to forced labour at the Kolyma gold mines in Siberia.

In December 1941, Dekabrist was employed on the Kola Run, the Allied supply route through the Norwegian Sea to the USSR's Arctic ports.

Dekabrist sailed in one east-bound convoy, PQ 6, in December 1941, returning with other empty Allied merchant ships in west-bound convoy QP 5 in January 1942.

== Fate ==
In November 1942, Dekabrist took part in Operation FB, an attempt to run several independent-sailing merchant ships under cover of the Arctic night.

Dekabrist sailed on 3 November, but was spotted and attacked by German aircraft. She was hit by a bomb which tore a hole in her bow. Despite efforts to save her, Dekabrist was abandoned at midnight on 5 November, and sank the following day.

Dekabrist's crew of 80 were able to abandon ship in four lifeboats; of these only one reached land, the inhospitable Hopen Island, and of that boat's 20 crew-members, only three survived. These were picked up by a German vessel in October 1943, 11 months after the sinking.
