= HMS Tartar (F43) =

Tribal-class destroyer

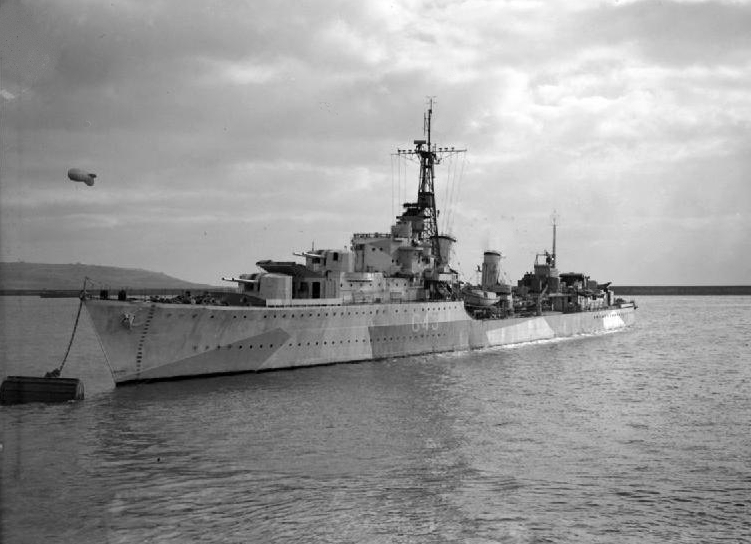
- Tartar at a buoy

History

United Kingdom
- Name: Tartar
- Namesake: Tatars
- Ordered: 19 June 1936
- Builder: Swan Hunter & Wigham Richardson, Wallsend
- Cost: £339,750
- Laid down: 26 August 1936
- Launched: 21 October 1937
- Commissioned: 10 March 1939
- Decommissioned: 1946
- Identification: Pennant numbers: G43, later F43
- Nickname(s): 'Lucky Tartar'
- Honours and awards: 12 battle honours
- Fate: Sold for scrap, 6 January 1948

General characteristics (as built)
- Class & type: Tribal-class destroyer
- Displacement: 1,891 long tons (1,921 t) (standard); 2,519 long tons (2,559 t) (deep load)
- Length: 377 ft (114.9 m) (o/a)
- Beam: 36 ft 6 in (11.13 m)
- Draught: 11 ft 3 in (3.43 m)
- Installed power: 3 × Admiralty 3-drum boilers; 44,000 shp (33,000 kW)
- Propulsion: 2 × shafts; 2 × geared steam turbines
- Speed: 36 knots (67 km/h; 41 mph)
- Range: 5,700 nmi (10,600 km; 6,600 mi) at 15 knots (28 km/h; 17 mph)
- Complement: 190
- Sensors & processing systems: ASDIC
- Armament: 4 × twin 4.7 in (120 mm) guns; 1 × quadruple 2-pdr (40 mm (1.6 in)) AA guns; 2 × quadruple 0.5 in (12.7 mm) anti-aircraft machineguns; 1 × quadruple 21 in (533 mm) torpedo tubes; 20 × depth charges, 1 × rack, 2 × throwers

HMS Tartar was a Tribal-class destroyer of the Royal Navy that saw service in most of the naval theatres of World War II. She had an eventful career, eventually receiving the nickname 'Lucky Tartar' due to her numerous escapes from dangerous situations. She was one of only four from the sixteen Royal Navy-operated Tribal-class destroyers to survive the war.

== Description ==
The Tribals were intended to counter the large destroyers being built abroad and to improve the firepower of the existing destroyer flotillas and were thus significantly larger and more heavily armed than the preceding I class. The ships displaced 1,891 long tons (1,921 t) at standard load and 2,519 long tons (2,559 t) at deep load. They had an overall length of 377 feet (114.9 m), a beam of 36 feet 6 inches (11.13 m) and a draught of 11 feet 3 inches (3.43 m). The destroyers were powered by two Parsons geared steam turbines, each driving one propeller shaft using steam provided by three Admiralty three-drum boilers. The turbines developed a total of 44,000 shaft horsepower (33,000 kW) and gave a maximum speed of 36 knots (67 km/h; 41 mph). During her sea trials Tartar made 35.9 knots (66.5 km/h; 41.3 mph) from 44,077 shp (32,868 kW) at a displacement of 2,025 long tons (2,057 t). The ships carried enough fuel oil to give them a range of 5,700 nautical miles (10,600 km; 6,600 mi) at 15 knots (28 km/h; 17 mph). The ships' complement consisted of 190 officers and ratings, although the flotilla leaders carried an extra 20 officers and men consisting of the Captain (D) and his staff.

The primary armament of the Tribal-class destroyers was eight quick-firing (QF) 4.7-inch (120 mm) Mark XII guns in four superfiring twin-gun mounts, one pair each fore and aft of the superstructure, designated 'A', 'B', 'X', and 'Y' from front to rear. The mounts had a maximum elevation of 40°. For anti-aircraft (AA) defence, they carried a single quadruple mount for the 40-millimetre (1.6 in) QF two-pounder Mk II "pom-pom" gun and two quadruple mounts for the 0.5-inch (12.7 mm) Mark III machine gun. Low-angle fire for the main guns was controlled by the director-control tower (DCT) on the bridge roof that fed data acquired by it and the 12-foot (3.7 m) rangefinder on the Mk II Rangefinder/Director directly aft of the DCT to an analogue mechanical computer, the Mk I Admiralty Fire Control Clock. Anti-aircraft fire for the main guns was controlled by the Rangefinder/Director which sent data to the mechanical Fuze Keeping Clock.

The ships were fitted with a single above-water quadruple mount for 21-inch (533 mm) torpedoes. The Tribals were not intended as anti-submarine ships, but they were provided with ASDIC, one depth charge rack and two throwers for self-defence, although the throwers were not mounted in all ships; Twenty depth charges was the peacetime allotment, but this increased to 30 during wartime.

=== Wartime modifications ===
Heavy losses to German air attack during the Norwegian Campaign demonstrated the ineffectiveness of the Tribals' anti-aircraft suite and the RN decided in May 1940 to replace 'X' mount with two QF 4-inch (102 mm) Mark XVI dual-purpose guns in a twin-gun mount. To better control the guns, the existing rangefinder/director was modified to accept a Type 285 gunnery radar as they became available. The number of depth charges was increased to 46 early in the war, and still more were added later. To increase the firing arcs of the AA guns, the rear funnel was shortened and the mainmast was reduced to a short pole mast.

== Construction and career ==
Authorized as one of nine Tribal-class destroyers under the 1936 Naval Estimates, Tartar was the seventh ship of her name to serve in the Royal Navy. The ship was ordered on 19 June 1936 from Swan Hunter & Wigham Richardson and was laid down on 26 August at the company's Wallsend, Tyne and Wear, shipyard. Launched on 21 October 1937, Tartar was commissioned on 10 March. The ship cost £341,462 which excluded weapons and communications outfits furnished by the Admiralty. She was equipped for use as a Flotilla leader.

After commissioning she was assigned to the 2nd Tribal Destroyer Flotilla of the Home Fleet, and was later transferred to the re-designated 6th Destroyer Flotilla. A period of trials and exercises was interrupted by the sinking of the submarine Thetis in Liverpool Bay on 1 June 1939. Tartar was one of the Home Fleet ships sent to the scene of the accident to assist in search and recovery efforts, and formed the Headquarters ship for rescue operations. Further work-up exercises revealed defects, and Tartar was under repair in Devonport Dockyard until the end of July 1939, after which she joined the Home Fleet at Scapa Flow.

=== Home Waters: the North Sea ===
On the outbreak of the Second World War, she carried out a number of activities with her flotilla, including screening major warships, intercepting blockade runners and commerce raiders and anti-submarine patrols. On 24 November, she was deployed with other Home Fleet ships to search for the German light battleships Scharnhorst and Gneisenau after the sinking of the armed merchant cruiser HMS Rawalpindi.

By December she was experiencing extensive leaking due to high speed operations in heavy weather conditions. This was a defect common to the Tribal-class destroyers, and Tartar was under repair at the yards of Alexander Stephen and Sons in Govan on the River Clyde until 29 December. January and February 1940 were spent escorting convoys to and from Norway, and screening fleet units. In March, she and Mohawk escorted the ocean liner RMS Queen Elizabeth through the Western Approaches on her maiden voyage, before moving to Rosyth to carry out convoy escort duties.

In April, Tartar escorted convoys HN-24 and HN-25, with breaks to search for German warships operating in the North Sea. She then supported allied operations off Norway, including escorting the damaged cruiser Suffolk and covering the evacuation of allied troops from Åndalsnes and Molde. She continued to operate off Norway until the end of May, at which point she returned to Scapa Flow. She was back in the North Sea in early June, escorting the aircraft carrier HMS Ark Royal and the battleship Valiant. She also escorted a number of allied evacuation convoys, and carried out another unsuccessful search for Scharnhorst and Gneisenau after the sinking of the aircraft carrier Glorious.

Tartar then embarked in an anti-submarine patrol with sisters Bedouin and Mashona. On 19 June she rescued survivors from a torpedoed Portuguese merchant vessel, and on 20 June, in company with Mashona, she seized control of the Swedish destroyers Romulus and Remus. After intense diplomatic activity they were later returned to Sweden. In the meantime, Tartar became the Leader of the 6th Flotilla whilst her sister Somali was under repair. Tartar herself needed repairs in mid July after sustaining damage to her rudder.

On 8 August she was temporarily assigned to Force H whilst providing an escort for ships bound for Gibraltar. On 5 September she was an escort for ships of the 1st Minelaying Squadron during minelaying in the Northern Barrage. A further refit at Devonport followed in October, which included work to repair leaks from the water feeds and the replacement of the twin 4.7 inch gun mounting in "X" position with twin 4 inch HA mounting to improve anti-aircraft defence. This work lasted until December, when Tartar returned to Scapa Flow as the Leader of the 4th Destroyer Flotilla.

In January and February 1941 she was used to escort a number of minelaying operations in the North Sea. On 1 March she was one of the destroyers escorting the landing ships of Operation Claymore to the Lofoten Islands, and then provided support for the landing operations. On 3 March she sank the German merchantman Bernhard Schulte at 61°55′N 5°07′E. Whilst carrying out this duty on 4 March, she intercepted the German trawler Krebbs and captured her with a boarding party. An Enigma machine and supporting documents were recovered and later transported to Bletchley Park to assist decryption efforts. In May Tartar was deployed to defend the Atlantic convoys. During these duties, she was present at the sinking of the German battleship Bismarck. After this, on 28 May Tartar was returning to Scapa Flow with Mashona, when they came under heavy air attack west of Ireland, and Tartar's action report states: "...It is believed that all attacking aircraft were H.E. 111's. Occasionally a F.W. Condor was seen shadowing astern. It is estimated that about 50 aircraft took part in the attacks over a period of 13 hours..." The Mashona was hit and badly damaged, eventually capsizing, but in return Tartar shot down an He 111 bomber. Tartar was able to rescue 14 officers and 215 ratings, and transported them to Greenock. During this engagement " Tartar used her Fuze Keeping Clock to aim her 4.7" guns and "...Every gun was used, the 4.7" in controlled fire and the 4" and close range weapons firing independently. 290 rounds of 4.7", 255 rounds of 4", 1,000 rounds of pom pom and 750 rounds of .5 machine gun ammunition were fired."

=== Arctic Ocean ===
Tartar resumed her duties with the Home Fleet in June 1941, when she was attached to a small force whose aim was to capture a German weather ship to obtain an Enigma coding machine and associated documentation. On 26 June she escorted the cruiser Nigeria with Bedouin from Scapa Flow to the waters off Jan Mayen Island. On 28 June the task force spotted the German weather ship Lauenburg and a boarding party from Tartar seized control of the vessel, recovering important documentation. Tartar then sank Lauenburg with gunfire. On 27 July she carried out reconnaissance of Spitsbergen to assess the possibility of using the island as a refuelling base for Russian convoys.

Tartar continued to operate in the Arctic Ocean throughout August. On 2 August she destroyed the weather station at Bear Island and evacuated Russian nationals to Murmansk from the island. Tartar accompanied the destroyer Inglefield while transporting King George VI to Scapa Flow. On 17 August she screened the battleship Prince of Wales that was carrying Winston Churchill back from his Atlantic Charter meeting with President Roosevelt. Shortly thereafter, Prince of Wales overtook an eastbound convoy of 73 ships, turned around and passed through the convoy again so that the Prime Minister and the merchant ships could greet each other. When Prince of Wales arrived on the River Clyde, Tartar embarked the Prime Minister and took him to Greenock for his return to London.

On 20 August Tartar escorted the troopship Empress of Australia and support ship RFA Oligarch to Spitsbergen to establish a garrison. Having successfully achieved this, she then escorted Empress of Australia to Murmansk, carrying members of the Russian and Norwegian populations of the island. She then underwent a refit, carried out by Green and Silley Weir, Royal Albert Dock, London, which lasted from September until mid-October. The work included removing the original mainmast to improve gunnery arcs, shortening the after funnel, relocating depth charge positions and installing the Type 285 gunnery radar for main armament fire-control. She returned to Scapa Flow after the completion of these works and became the Leader of the 6th Flotilla.

January and February 1942 were spent escorting Russian convoys, including convoys PQ 7B, QP 5, PQ 12, PQ 13 and QP 9. On 8 March Tartar screened Home Fleet units carrying out an unsuccessful search for the German battleship Tirpitz. During these operations, she sustained damage to her forward gun mounting due to high-speed operations in rough weather. At the end of March she travelled to Hull for repair and refit at Brigham and Cowan's shipyard until June. From 17 February until 28 April 1942 Tartar's captain was Commander R. T. White D.S.O.** (later Captain R. T. White D.S.O.**, 2nd son of Sir Archibald White, Bt., of Wallingwells).

=== Mediterranean ===
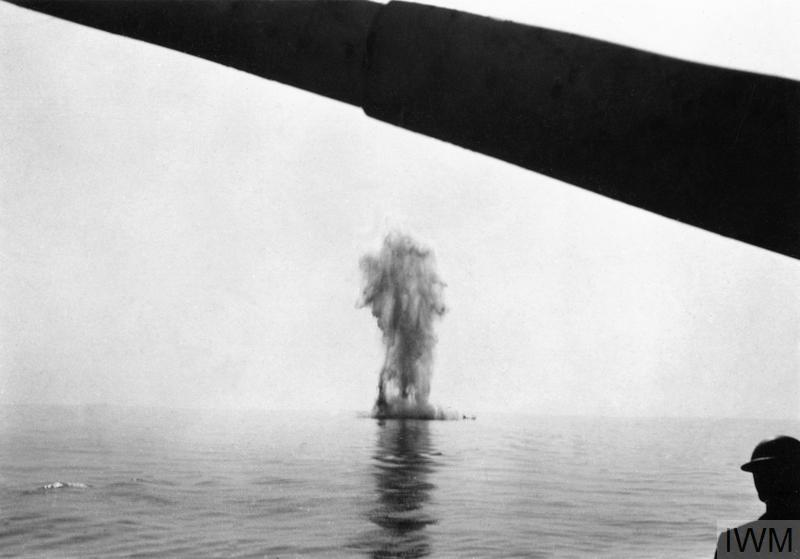
HMS Foresight sinking after being torpedoed by Tartar on 12 August 1942. The torpedo has blown away the entire midships section of the ship.

In August 1942, Tartar was assigned to support Royal Navy operations in the Mediterranean. She took part in Operation Pedestal as part of the escort. The convoy came under air and submarine attacks from 11 August after it was sighted by the Italian submarine Uarsciek. On 12 August, Tartar carried out depth charge attacks to drive off the Italian submarine Granito, and together with the destroyer Lookout drove off the Italian submarine Emo. After the destroyer Foresight was damaged in an air attack, Tartar took her in tow, and attempted to bring her to Gibraltar. On the way, she was the target of an unsuccessful attack by German submarine U-73 (1940) on 13 August, and after that it was decided that attempts to save Foresight were hopeless. Tartar took off Foresight's crew, then scuttled her with a torpedo. After the culmination of Operation Pedestal, Tartar sailed to rejoin the Home Fleet at Scapa Flow.

On her return in September, she formed part of the escort for Convoy PQ 18 and then Convoy QP 14. In October, she returned to the Mediterranean to support Operation Torch, the allied landings in North Africa. During this deployment, from 8 November to 30 November, she screened fleet units and convoys, and carried out anti-submarine patrols. She was then attached to Force Q at Algiers, where she was assigned to intercept enemy supply convoys and escort allied convoys. She carried out these duties into February 1943, despite coming under attack on numerous occasions. On 28 April 1943, Tartar carried out an attack on E-boats near Marettimo, Sicily, and on 7 May she deployed with other destroyers of the Mediterranean Fleet to blockade the Cape Bon area to intercept craft attempting to evacuate enemy personnel from Tunisia.

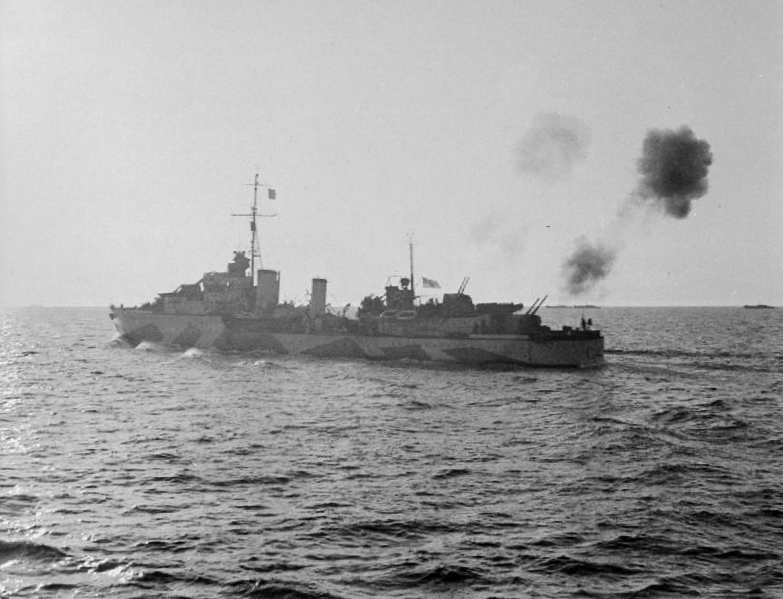
Salerno, 9 September 1943, Tartar puts up an anti-aircraft barrage with her 4.7-inch guns

In June, she was supporting operations off Pantelleria, and in July was escorting convoys as part of Operation Husky, the Allied invasion of Sicily. On 11 July, she rescued some 200 survivors from the hospital ship Talamba, which had been sunk by German air attack off the beach head. On 12 July Tartar sank the Allied Ammunition ship SS Baarn, which was on fire after being damaged in air attacks. On 13 July, she took the damaged destroyer Eskimo in tow to Malta, after Eskimo had been damaged by air attacks. In August, she supported the Allied invasion of Italy, by covering the landings at Calabria, and later the landings at Salerno. On 19 September, Tartar provided gunfire support during a German counter-attack, and subsequently came under attacks from radio-controlled glider bombs She returned to the UK at the end of October and spent the last months of 1943, and January and February 1944, under refit at Devonport.

=== Home waters: the English Channel ===
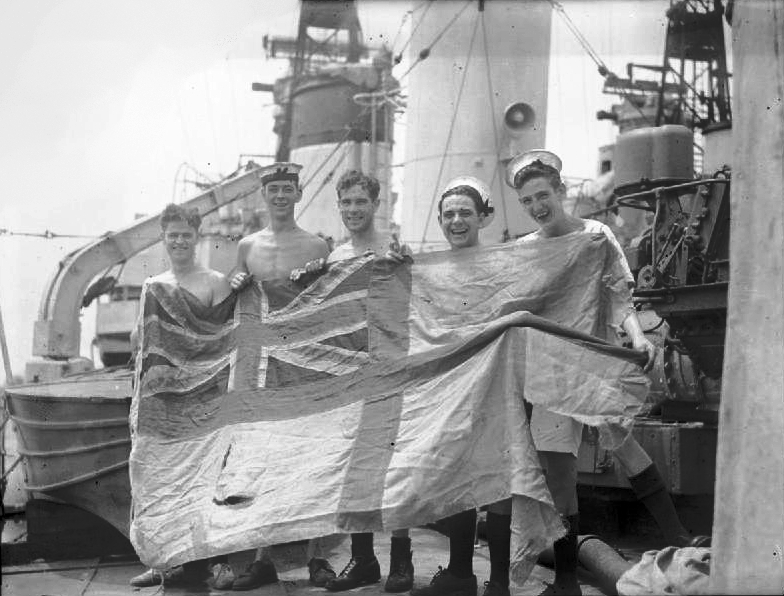
A proud souvenir, the torn Battle Ensign of HMS Tartar, carried in her action with German destroyers in the Channel

In March and April 1944 she deployed as the Leader of the 10th Destroyer Flotilla with the Plymouth Command to carry out offensive patrols against coastal shipping off the French coast, as well as escorting allied convoys through the English Channel. In May she provided cover with the cruiser Bellona for the minelayer Apollo, on a minelaying operation off the French coast in preparation for the Allied landings in Normandy. On 6 June she led the 10th Destroyer Flotilla into the English Channel to prevent German interference with the landings or the passage of convoys during Operation Neptune.

On 9 June she and the flotilla were in action against German warships. Though the German destroyers ZH1 and Z32 were sunk, Tartar was damaged by return fire. Her galley and bridge were hit and set on fire. Four men were killed and twelve wounded including Commander Jones. Her foremast hung over the side and all of the radar and communications were dead. She returned to Devonport briefly to undergo temporary repairs, before resuming operations in the English Channel. On 7 July she intercepted and engaged minesweepers of the 46th German Flotilla off the Channel Islands and sank the minesweepers M4601 and M4605. On 6 August Bellona, Tartar, Ashanti and the Canadian destroyers Haida and Iroquois attacked a convoy off Saint-Nazaire, sinking the minesweepers M263 and M486, the patrol boat V414 and a coastal launch together with four small ships.

=== Far East ===
Tartar underwent another refit from November 1944 until February 1945, after which she was assigned to serve with the Eastern Fleet. In March 1945 she escorted several escort aircraft carriers to Gibraltar and then carried out exercises in the Mediterranean before departing for Trincomalee, where she arrived on 20 April. She was initially deployed with the 10th Destroyer Flotilla as a screen for the ships involved in a sweep of the Andaman and Nicobar areas. She then participated in bombardments of Car Nicobar and Port Blair, as well as covering Operation Dracula, the allied landings at Rangoon.

Further deployments included screening duties and attacks on enemy shipping, during which time she came under repeated air attacks, but without damage or casualties. She was then assigned to the planned Operation Zipper, but it was never carried out. She spent the rest of the war on escort and screening duties until the Japanese surrender. She was present at the signing of the Japanese Instrument of Surrender in Tokyo Bay on 2 September 1945.

=== Post-war ===
After the end of the war, Tartar sailed for Penang on 7 September 1945 and from there to the UK, where she arrived at Plymouth on 17 November. She was paid off and placed in reserve in early 1946 after having been de-stored. She was used as an Accommodation Ship for Reserve Fleet personnel before being placed on the Disposal List in 1947.

Tartar was sold to BISCO for breaking up on 6 January 1948 and arrived at J. Cashmore's yard in Newport, South Wales for demolition on 22 February. She had gained a total of twelve battle honours for her service in the war.

== Battle honours ==
=== Inherited honours ===
- Velez Malaga 1704
- Ushant 1781
- Baltic 1855
- South Africa 1899–1900
- Belgian Coast 1914–16

=== World War II ===
- Norway 1940–41
- Bismarck 1941
- Arctic 1942
- Malta Convoys 1942
- North Africa 1942–43
- Sicily 1943
- Salerno 1943
- Mediterranean 1943
- Normandy 1944
- English Channel 1944
- Biscay 1944
- Burma 1945
