= SS Deneb =

Cargo ship built in 1923

Germany
- Name: Rhenania
- Owner: Westdeutsche Schiffahrts AG
- Launched: 1923

Germany
- Name: Marth Halm
- Owner: E Halm & Co
- Acquired: 1924

Finland
- Name: Bore VII
- Owner: Ångfartyg Ab Bore
- Acquired: 1926

Germany
- Name: Götaälv
- Owner: August Bolten Wm. Miller's Nachfolger
- Acquired: 1937

(Nazi Germany) Germany
- Name: Bernhard Schulte
- Owner: Schulte & Bruns
- Acquired: 1938
- Captured: 1945

Great Britain
- Name: Empire Congo
- Owner: Ministry of War Transport; Ministry of Transport

Great Britain
- Name: Coquetside
- Owner: Coquet Shipping Co
- Acquired: 1947

Italy
- Name: Deneb
- Owner: C Cosulich
- Acquired: 1951

Italy
- Name: Deneb
- Owner: Nautica SpA
- Acquired: 1958
- Fate: Scrapped in 1966

General characteristics
- Type: Cargo ship
- Tonnage: 1,080 GRT; 654 NRT; 1,700 DWT
- Length: 223 ft 9 in (68.20 m)
- Beam: 34 ft 9 in (10.59 m)
- Depth: 14 ft 7 in (4.45 m)
- Installed power: Triple expansion steam engine
- Propulsion: Screw propeller

Deneb was a 1,080 GRT cargo ship that was built in 1923 as Rhenania by Nüscke & Co, Stettin for German owners. She was sold in 1924 and renamed Marth Halm In 1927, she was sold to Finnish owners and renamed Bore VII. She ran aground in 1936 and was declared a total loss. In 1937, she was sold to Germany, repaired and renamed Götaälv. In 1938 she was sold and renamed Bernhard Schulte. In 1941, she sank off the Lofoten Islands but was salvaged and repaired.

Bernhard Schulte was seized by the Allies at Flensburg, Germany in May 1945, passed to the Ministry of War Transport (MoWT) and renamed Empire Congo. In 1947, she was sold into merchant service and renamed Coquetside. In 1951, she was sold to Italy and renamed Deneb. She served until 1966 when she was scrapped at La Spezia, Italy.

== Description ==
The ship was built in 1923 by Nüscke & Co, Stettin.

The ship was 223 feet 9 inches (68.20 m) long, with a beam of 34 feet 9 inches (10.59 m) a depth of 14 feet 7 inches (4.45 m). She had a GRT of 1,080 and a NRT of 654. She had a DWT of 1,700

The ship was propelled by a triple expansion steam engine, which had cylinders of 17 5/16 inches (44.0 cm), 27 5/8 inches (70 cm) and 45 11/16 inches (116.0 cm) diameter by 27 5/8 inches (70 cm) stroke. The engine was built by A Borsig GmbH, Berlin.

== History ==
Rhenania was built for Westdeutsche Schiffahrts AG, Düsseldorf. On 11 January 1924, she ran aground at Korsør, Denmark. She was refloated on 14 January. At some point in 1924, she was sold to E Halm & Co, Köln and renamed Marth Halm. She was operated by Kölner Reederei AG. In 1926, she was sold to Ångfartyg Ab Bore, Turku, Finland and renamed Bore VII. She was placed under the management of Thr. Kramer. Her port of registry was Turku. Bore VII was allocated the Code Letters THFJ and the Finnish Official Number 981. In 1934, her Code Letters were changed to OHGQ. On 18 December 1936, Bore VII ran aground off Kotka, Finland and was declared a total loss.

In 1937, the wreck was sold to August Bolten Wm. Miller's Nachfolger, Hamburg. The ship was repaired and renamed Götaälv. She was allocated the Code Letters DJTY. In 1938, she was sold to Schulte & Bruns, Emden and renamed Bernhard Schulte. On 3 March 1941, Bernhard Schulte was sunk by HMS Tartar off the Lofoten Islands, Norway (61°55′N 5°07′E) during Operation Claymore. She was salvaged and repaired. In May 1945, Bernhard Schulte was seized by the Allies at Flensburg, Germany. She was passed to the MoWT and renamed Empire Congo.

Empire Congo was placed under the management of Monroe Bros Ltd. Her port of registry was changed to London. She was allocated the Code Letters GKRQ and the United Kingdom Official Number 180607. In 1947, she was sold to Coquet Shipping Co, Newcastle upon Tyne and renamed Coquetside. She was operated under the management of Anthony & Bainbridge Ltd. In 1951, Coquetside was sold to C Cosulich, Sicily, Italy and renamed Deneb. She was sold in 1958 to Nautica SpA, Sardinia, Italy. Deneb served until October 1966, when she was scrapped at La Spezia, Italy.
