= German submarine U-134 =

U-134 may refer to one of the following German submarines:

- SM U-134, a Type U 127 submarine laid down during the First World War but unfinished at the end of the war; broken up incomplete 1919–20
  - During the First World War, Germany also had this submarine with a similar name:
    - SM UB-134, a Type UB III submarine ordered in 1917 but not completed by the end of the war
- German submarine U-134 (1941) was a submarine built in 1941, for service in the Second World War, and sunk in 1943.
