= German submarine U-134 (1941) =

German World War II submarine

History

Nazi Germany
- Name: U-134
- Ordered: 7 August 1939
- Builder: Bremer Vulkan, Bremen-Vegesack
- Yard number: 13
- Laid down: 6 September 1940
- Launched: 17 May 1941
- Commissioned: 26 July 1941
- Fate: Sunk by depth charges, 27 August 1943

General characteristics
- Class & type: Type VIIC submarine
- Displacement: 769 tonnes (757 long tons) surfaced; 871 t (857 long tons) submerged
- Length: 67.10 m (220 ft 2 in) o/a; 50.50 m (165 ft 8 in) pressure hull
- Beam: 6.20 m (20 ft 4 in) o/a; 4.70 m (15 ft 5 in) pressure hull
- Height: 9.60 m (31 ft 6 in)
- Draught: 4.72 m (15 ft 6 in)
- Installed power: 2,800–3,200 PS (2,100–2,400 kW; 2,800–3,200 bhp) (diesels); 750 PS (550 kW; 740 shp) (electric)
- Propulsion: 2 shafts; 2 × diesel engines; 2 × electric motors
- Speed: 17.7 knots (32.8 km/h; 20.4 mph) surfaced; 7.6 knots (14.1 km/h; 8.7 mph) submerged
- Range: 8,500 nmi (15,700 km; 9,800 mi) at 10 knots (19 km/h; 12 mph) surfaced; 80 nmi (150 km; 92 mi) at 4 knots (7.4 km/h; 4.6 mph) submerged
- Test depth: 230 m (750 ft); Calculated crush depth: 250–295 m (820–968 ft)
- Complement: 4 officers, 40–56 enlisted
- Armament: 5 × 53.3 cm (21 in) torpedo tubes (four bow, one stern); 14 × torpedoes or 26 TMA mines; 1 × 8.8 cm (3.46 in) deck gun (220 rounds); 1 x 2 cm (0.79 in) C/30 AA gun

Service record
- Part of: 5th U-boat Flotilla; 26 July – 31 October 1941; 3rd U-boat Flotilla; 1 November 1941 – 27 August 1943
- Identification codes: M 45 658
- Commanders: Kptlt. Rudolf Schendel; 26 July 1941 – 2 February 1943; Oblt.z.S. / Kptlt. Hans-Günther Brosin; 3 February – 27 August 1943
- Operations: 9 patrols: 1st patrol: 1 – 12 December 1941; 2nd patrol: 24 December 1941 – 20 January 1942; 3rd patrol: 1 – 22 February 1942; 4th patrol: 1 – 15 March 1942; 5th patrol: a. 19 – 20 May 1942; b. 21 May – 1 June 1942; 6th patrol: 11 June – 1 September 1942; 7th patrol: 15 October 1942 – 19 January 1943; 8th patrol: 6 March – 2 May 1943; 9th patrol: 10 June – 27 August 1943
- Victories: 3 merchant ships sunk (12,147 GRT); 1 airship shot down

German submarine U-134 was a Type VIIC U-boat of Nazi Germany's Kriegsmarine during World War II. She was laid down on 6 September 1940 by Bremer Vulkan in Bremen-Vegesack as yard number 13 and commissioned on 26 July 1941. In seven patrols, U-134 sank three ships for a total of 12,147 gross register tons (GRT).

== Design ==
Being a German Type VIIC submarine, U-134 was longer than the Type VIIB submarines. It had a displacement of 769 tonnes (757 long tons) when at the surface and 871 tonnes (857 long tons) while submerged. She had a total length of 67.10 m (220 ft 2 in), a pressure hull length of 50.50 m (165 ft 8 in), a beam of 6.20 m (20 ft 4 in), a height of 9.60 m (31 ft 6 in), and a draught of 4.74 m (15 ft 7 in). The submarine was powered by two MAN, 6-cylinder, 4-stroke M6V 40/46 four-stroke, six-cylinder supercharged diesel engines producing a total of 2,800 to 3,200 metric horsepower (2,060 to 2,350 kW; 2,760 to 3,160 shp) for use while surfaced, two Brown, Boveri & Cie GG UB 720/8 double-acting electric motors producing a total of 750 metric horsepower (550 kW; 740 shp) for use while submerged. She had two shafts and two 1.23 m (4 ft) propellers. The boat was capable of operating at depths of up to 230 metres (750 ft).

The submarine had a maximum surface speed of 17.7 knots (32.8 km/h; 20.4 mph) and a maximum submerged speed of 7.6 knots (14.1 km/h; 8.7 mph). When submerged, the boat could operate for 80 nautical miles (150 km; 92 mi) at 4 knots (7.4 km/h; 4.6 mph); when surfaced, she could travel 8,500 nautical miles (15,700 km; 9,800 mi) at 10 knots (19 km/h; 12 mph). U-134 was fitted with five 53.3 cm (21 in) torpedo tubes (four fitted at the bow and one at the stern), fourteen torpedoes, one 8.8 cm (3.46 in) SK C/35 naval gun, 220 rounds, and a 2 cm (0.79 in) C/30 anti-aircraft gun. The boat had a complement of between forty-four and sixty.

== Service history ==
=== Patrols off Norway ===
On her first patrol off the northern coast of Norway, on 9 December 1941, U-134, under the command of Kapitänleutnant Rudolf Schendel, attacked a four-ship convoy and sank the 2,185 GRT German merchant ship Steinbek. Schendel was later notified by BdU (U-boat Headquarters) that he had attacked a German convoy. An OKM (Naval High Command) investigation blamed U-134's commander for the incident, but also noted that he had not been informed of the positions of the German ships in the area.

On her second patrol off the coast of Norway, on 2 January 1942, U-134 sank the British cargo ship Waziristan of Convoy PQ 7a, carrying 3,700 tons of military supplies, including 410 Ford trucks, for Russia from New York.

=== Transfer to France ===
U-134 had no success during her next three patrols, before being transferred from the base at Kirkenes, Norway, to La Pallice, France, in mid-1942.

Her next patrol, the sixth, in June–September 1942 took her to the Gulf coast of the United States, but she made no attacks.

=== SS Scapa Flow ===
On her seventh patrol to the central Atlantic, on 14 November 1942, U-134 sank the 4,827 GRT Panamanian steamship SS Scapa Flow that carried manganese ore, latex and baled rubber. At 4:58 pm the steamer was hit on the portside under the bridge and at the third hatch by two torpedoes and sank in one minute at position 12°N 30°W in the Atlantic Ocean. She had been located at 11:37 am on a route where attacks were prohibited. The U-boat first obtained permission to attack. 23 survivors escaped in a damaged lifeboat, having two rafts and a tin of bandages. The master and chief engineer of the steamer had drowned.

For her eighth patrol command of U-134 passed to Oberleutnant zur See Hans-Günther Brosin, but during 58 days in the North Atlantic, from 6 March to 2 May 1943, she made no attacks.

=== Blimp K-74 ===
On 10 June 1943 U-134 sailed once more to the Florida coast on her ninth and final patrol, where the American 250-foot-long (76 m), Goodyear-built ZPK-class K-74 blimp became the only airship to be shot down in the war. K-74, launched from Naval Air Station Richmond, Florida, detected U-134 on radar in the Straits of Florida at 23:40 on 18 July 1943. United States Navy doctrine required blimps to stay out of range of surfaced submarines and guide aircraft or ships to attack. The blimp's pilot, Lieutenant Nelson C. Grills, USNR, disregarded this doctrine in an attempt to prevent U-134 from reaching a tanker and freighter ahead of the submarine. K-74 was hit by U-134's 20mm cannon fire during its 55-knot approach. K-74 returned 100 rounds of .50 caliber (12.7 mm) fire before the machine gun was unable to depress sufficiently as the blimp passed over U-134 on its bombing run. A common misconception is that K-74's Mark XVII depth charges failed to release as the blimp passed over U-134, however this is known to be false as the sub received below-the-waterline damage consistent with a depth bomb. The airship lost control and went nose-up, quickly rose to an altitude of 1,000 feet, and after jettisoning external fuel tanks to regain control slowly fell tail-first into the sea. None of the ten-man crew was injured and all moved away from K-74 to avoid anticipated depth charge detonations when it sank. K-74 remained afloat for eight hours, however, and U-134 pulled part of the wreckage aboard for photographs and evaluation. All but one of K-74's crew were rescued the following day by the submarine chaser USS SC-657 and the destroyer USS Dahlgren. Aviation Machinist's Mate second class Isadore Stessel drowned after being attacked by a shark, just minutes before rescue, and became the only United States Navy airshipman to die as a result of enemy action.

=== Sunk ===
U-134 was sunk on 27 August 1943 in the Bay of Biscay, north of Cape Ortegal at 44°03′N 08°05′W by depth charges from the British frigate HMS Rother. All 48 men on board died. U-134 had passed the images of K-74 to another U-boat prior to being sunk. The United States Navy was unaware K-74 had been boarded until the photographs were discovered in 1958.

=== Wolfpacks ===
U-134 took part in seven wolfpacks, namely:

- Ulan (25 December 1941 – 19 January 1942)
- Umbau (4 – 16 February 1942)
- Endrass (12 – 17 June 1942)
- Streitaxt (20 October - 2 November 1942)
- Stürmer (11 – 20 March 1943)
- Seeteufel (21 – 30 March 1943)
- Meise (15 – 22 April 1943)

== Summary of raiding history ==
| Date | Name | Nationality | Tonnage (GRT) | Fate |
|---|---|---|---|---|
| 9 December 1941 | Steinbek | Nazi Germany | 2,185 | Sunk |
| 2 January 1942 | Waziristan | United Kingdom | 5,135 | Sunk |
| 14 November 1942 | Scapa Flow | Panama | 4,827 | Sunk |

== Bibliography ==
- Busch, Rainer; Röll, Hans-Joachim (1999). German U-boat commanders of World War II : a biographical dictionary. Translated by Brooks, Geoffrey. London, Annapolis, Md: Greenhill Books, Naval Institute Press. ISBN 1-55750-186-6.
- Busch, Rainer; Röll, Hans-Joachim (1999). Deutsche U-Boot-Verluste von September 1939 bis Mai 1945 [German U-boat losses from September 1939 to May 1945]. Der U-Boot-Krieg (in German). Vol. IV. Hamburg, Berlin, Bonn: Mittler. ISBN 3-8132-0514-2.
- Gröner, Erich; Jung, Dieter; Maass, Martin (1991). U-boats and Mine Warfare Vessels. German Warships 1815–1945. Vol. 2. Translated by Thomas, Keith; Magowan, Rachel. London: Conway Maritime Press. ISBN 0-85177-593-4.
- Vaeth, J. Gordon (August 1979). Incident in the Florida Straits. United States Naval Institute Proceedings. pp. 84–86.
- Kemp, Paul (1999). U-Boats Destroyed - German Submarine Losses in the World Wars. London: Arms & Armour. ISBN 1-85409-515-3.
