= Convoy RA 55A =

Allied convoy of World War II

- Part of the Arctic Convoys of the Second World War
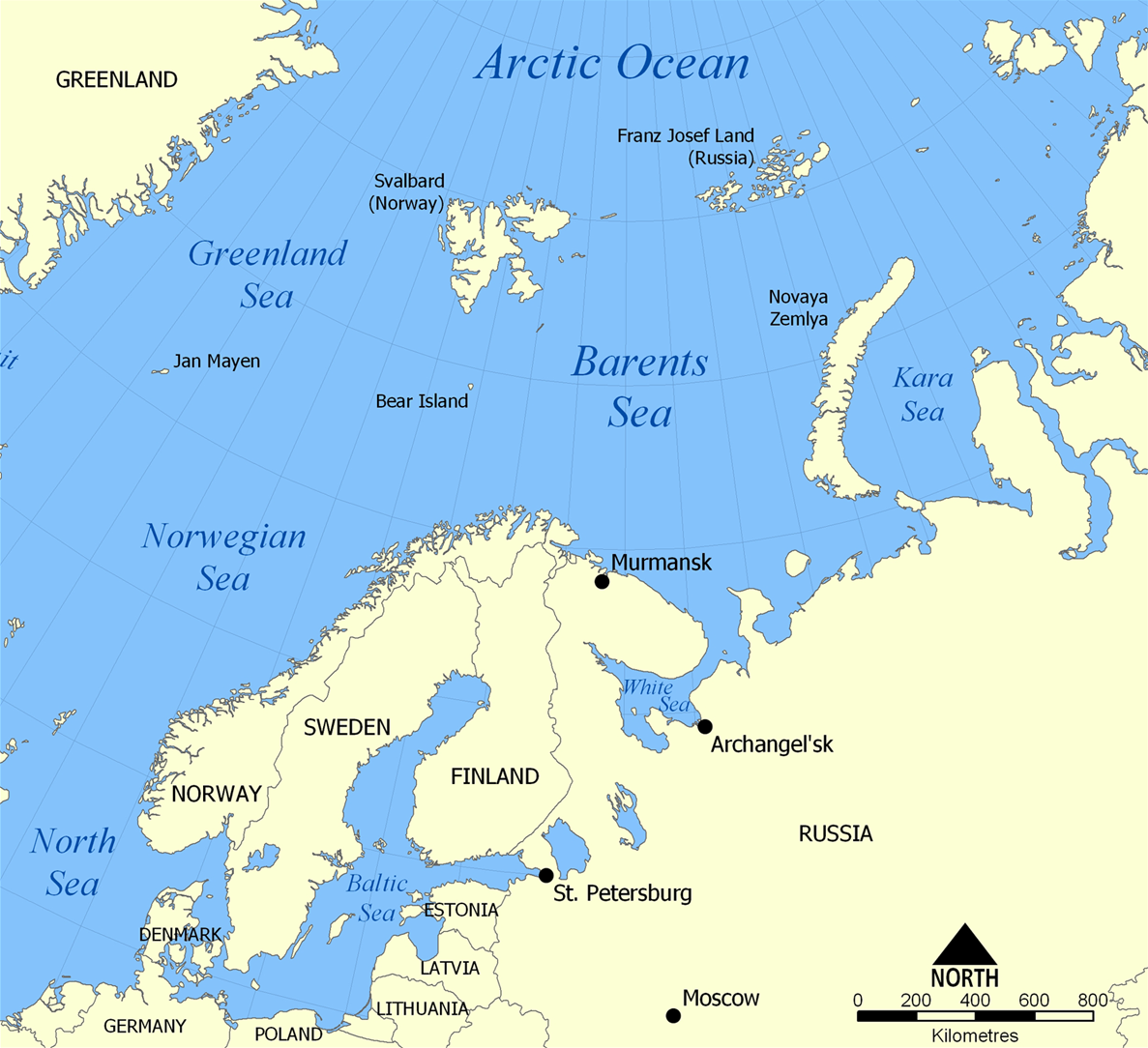
- The Norwegian Sea and the Barents Sea, site of the Arctic convoys
Location
- Barents Sea
- Norwegian Sea

Belligerents
Royal Navy; Merchant Navy	(Nazi Germany) Luftwaffe; Kriegsmarine

Convoy RA 55A was an Arctic convoy during World War II. It was one of a series of convoys run to return Allied ships from Soviet northern ports to ports in Britain. It sailed in late December 1943, reaching British ports at the end of the month. All ships arrived safely.

== Forces ==
RA 55A consisted of 23 merchant ships which departed from Kola Inlet on 22 December 1943. Close escort was provided by the two destroyers, Westcott and Beagle, a minesweeper and three corvettes. There was also an Ocean escort, comprising the destroyer Milne (Capt. IMR Campbell commanding) and seven other Home Fleet destroyers. A cruiser cover force comprising Belfast (V.Adm R Burnett commanding), Norfolk, and Sheffield also followed the convoy from Murmansk, to guard against attack by surface units. Distant cover would be provided by a Heavy Cover Force comprising the battleship Duke of York, the cruiser Jamaica and four destroyers under the command of V Adm. Bruce Fraser, which at the time of RA 55A's departure was trailing the Murmansk-bound convoy JW 55B.

RA 55A was threatened by a U-boat force of eight boats in a patrol line, code-named Eisenbart, in the Norwegian Sea, and a surface force comprising the battleship Scharnhorst and five destroyers was also available, stationed at Altenfjord.

== Action ==
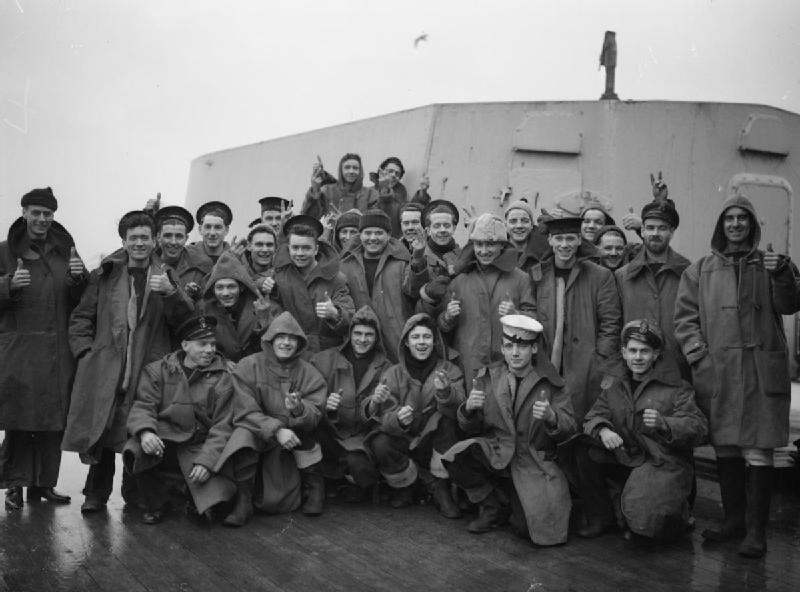
Members of Sheffield's gun crews after the Battle of the North Cape

Convoy RA 55A sailed from Kola with its escort on 22 December 1943, two days after JW 55B had sailed from Britain. The Admiralty were aware of the threat of a sortie by Scharnhorst and Adm Fraser was placed in overall command of the operation, co-ordinating the movements of both convoys and the various escort forces. On 25 December 1943 Fraser received intelligence that Scharnhorst had sailed; RA 55A was diverted north, to avoid detection, and later that day, was ordered to dispatch four of the supporting destroyers to reinforce JW 55B. The destroyers HMS Matchless, Musketeer, Opportune and Virago were sent, later taking part in the Battle of the North Cape, which saw the destruction of Scharnhorst. Convoy RA 55A was not sighted by any Axis forces, and cleared the danger area without further incident. The convoy was met on 30 December 1943 by the western local escort, two minesweepers and two corvettes, and arrived safely at Loch Ewe on 1 January 1944.

== Conclusion ==
The 23 ships of RA 55A arrived in Britain without loss, while the German attempt to attack the convoy had led to the loss of Scharnhorst, their last operational capital ship in Norway; an action in which RA 55A's escorting destroyers had played a significant role.

== Allied order of battle ==
=== Convoyed ships ===
Merchant ships (Note: A convoy had a standard formation of short columns, number 1 to port in the direction of travel. Each position in the column was numbered; 11 was the first ship in column 1 and 12 was the next ship in the column; 21 was the first ship in column 2.)
Ship	Year	Flag	GRT	Notes
Arthur L Perry	1943	United States	7,176	
Daniel Drake	1943	United States	7,176	
Edmund Fanning	1943	United States	7,176	
Empire Carpenter	1943	Merchant Navy	7,025	
Empire Celia	1943	Merchant Navy	7,025	
Empire Nigel	1943	Merchant Navy	7,067	
Fort McMurray	1942	Merchant Navy	7,133	
Fort Yukon	1943	Merchant Navy	7,153	
Gilbert Stuart	1943	United States	7,176	
Henry Villard	1942	United States	7,176	
James Smith	1942	United States	7,181	
Junecrest	1942	Merchant Navy	6,945	
Mijdrecht	1931	Netherlands	7,493	
Ocean Strength	1942	Merchant Navy	7,173	
Ocean Vanity	1942	Merchant Navy	7,174	
Ocean Verity	1942	Merchant Navy	7,174	
Park Holland	1943	United States	7,176	
Rathlin	1936	Merchant Navy	1,600	
San Adolfo	1935	Merchant Navy	7,365	
Thomas Kearns	1943	United States	7,184	
Thomas Sim Lee	1942	United States	7,191	
William L Marcy	1942	United States	7,176	
William Windom	1943	United States	7,191	

=== Escorts ===
Escort forces (in relays)
Name	Navy	Class	Notes
Close escort
HMS Beagle	Royal Navy	B-class destroyer	
HMS Westcott	Royal Navy	W-class destroyer	
HMS Acanthus	Royal Navy	Flower-class corvette	
HMS Dianella	Royal Navy	Flower-class corvette	
HMS Poppy	Royal Navy	Flower-class corvette	
HMS Seagull	Royal Navy	Halcyon-class minesweeper	
Ocean escort
HMS Ashanti	Royal Navy	Tribal-class destroyer	
HMCS Athabaskan	Royal Navy	Tribal-class destroyer	
HMS Milne	Royal Navy	M-class destroyer	(SOE)
HMS Matchless	Royal Navy	M-class destroyer	
HMS Meteor	Royal Navy	M-class destroyer	
HMS Musketeer	Royal Navy	M-class destroyer	
HMS Opportune	Royal Navy	o-class destroyer	
Virago	Royal Navy	V-class destroyer	
Cruiser cover
HMS Norfolk	Royal Navy	County-class cruiser	
HMS Belfast	Royal Navy	Town-class cruiser	(flag)
HMS Sheffield	Royal Navy	Town-class cruiser	
Distant cover
HMS Duke of York	Royal Navy	King George V-class battleship	(flag)
HMS Jamaica	Royal Navy	Fiji-class cruiser	
HMS Saumarez	Royal Navy	S-class destroyer	
HMS Savage	Royal Navy	S-class destroyer	
HMS Scorpion	Royal Navy	S-class destroyer	
HNoMS Stord	Royal Norwegian Navy	S-class destroyer	

== German order of battle ==
=== Kriegsmarine ===
Escort forces (in relays)
Name	Navy	Class	Notes
Ships
Scharnhorst	Kriegsmarine	Scharnhorst-class battleship	(flag)
Z29	Kriegsmarine	Type 1936A-class destroyer	
Z30	Kriegsmarine	Type 1936A-class destroyer	
Z33	Kriegsmarine	1936A (Mob) destroyer	
Z34	Kriegsmarine	1936A (Mob) destroyer	
Z38	Kriegsmarine	1936A (Mob) destroyer	
U-boats
U-314	Kriegsmarine	Type VIIC submarine	
U-354	Kriegsmarine	Type VIIC submarine	
U-387	Kriegsmarine	Type VIIC submarine	
U-601	Kriegsmarine	Type VIIC submarine	
U-716	Kriegsmarine	Type VIIC submarine	
U-957	Kriegsmarine	Type VIIC submarine	

== Bibliography ==
- Kemp, Paul (1993). Convoy! Drama in Arctic Waters. London: Arms and Armour Press. ISBN 1-85409-130-1.
- Ruegg, R.; Hague, A. (1993) [1992]. Convoys to Russia: Allied Convoys and Naval Surface Operations in Arctic Waters 1941–1945 (2nd rev. enl. ed.). Kendal: World Ship Society. ISBN 0-905617-66-5.
