= Convoy JW 55B =

World War II convoy

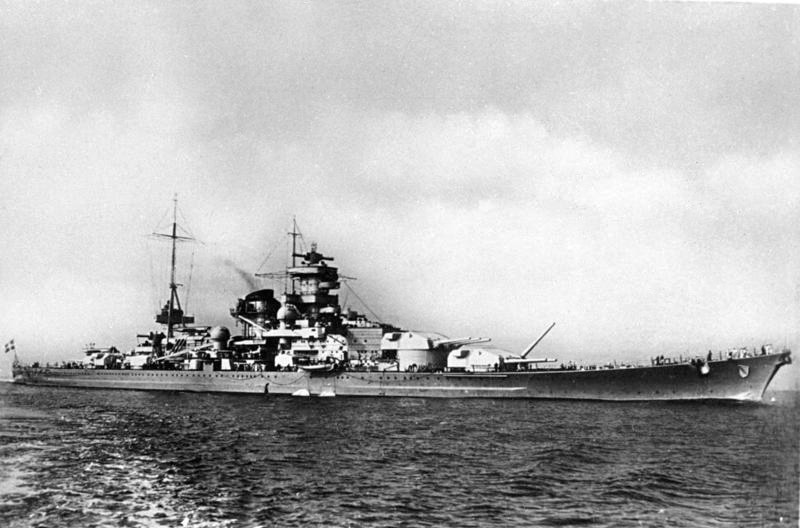
The German battleship Scharnhorst

Convoy JW 55B was an Arctic convoy sent from Great Britain by the Western Allies to aid the Soviet Union during World War II. It sailed in late December 1943, reaching the Soviet northern ports at the end of the month. All ships arrived safely.

During the voyage JW 55B was approached by a German force with the battleship Scharnhorst; no contact was made with the convoy but Scharnhorst was sunk, in the Battle of the North Cape, by the battleship HMS Duke of York, a handful of Royal Navy light surface combatants and the Norwegian destroyer HNoMS Stord.

== Ships ==
The convoy, comprising 19 merchant ships, departed Loch Ewe on 20 December 1943. Close escort was provided by two destroyers and three other escort vessels. There was also an Ocean escort, comprising the destroyer Onslow (Captain J A McCoy commanding) and seven other Home Fleet destroyers. The convoy was initially accompanied by a local escort group, and joined later by the ocean escort of convoy JW 55A, from Murmansk. A cruiser cover force comprising Belfast (Vice Admiral Robert Burnett commanding), Norfolk, and Sheffield also followed the convoy, to guard against attack by surface units. Distant cover was provided by a Heavy Cover Force comprising the battleship Duke of York, the cruiser Jamaica and four destroyers under the command of Vice Admiral Bruce Fraser.

JW 55B was opposed by a force of thirteen U-boats in a patrol line, code-named Eisenbart, in the Norwegian Sea. A surface force comprising the battleship Scharnhorst and five destroyers was also in readiness, stationed at Altenfjord.

== Action ==
JW 55B departed Loch Ewe on 20 December 1943 accompanied by its local escort of two minesweepers and two corvettes, and its close escort. Two days later on 22 December, it was joined by the ocean escort, while the local escort returned. At the same time the Cruiser Force, from Murmansk, and the Distant Cover Force, waiting at Akureyri, in Iceland, also put to sea, taking station in the Norwegian Sea. The convoy was sighted the same day by a patrolling German aircraft which commenced shadowing; a succession of aircraft were able to maintain contact over the next few days, sending accurate reports of course and speed to the surface force at Altenfjord.

On 25 December the convoy was sighted by U-601, an Eisenbart boat, and later that day Admiral Bey, in Scharnhorst, received permission to sortie with his force. That evening U-716 came close enough to fire on one of the escorts, while another was depth charged. Also on 25 December, JW 55B was joined by the ocean escort of JW 55A, which was accompanying the returning convoy RA 55A. Fraser was concerned a German surface force would reach JW 55B before he would, and ordered the convoy to reverse course. In the event this proved too difficult, but the convoy was slowed to 8 knots (15 km/h; 9.2 mph) to assist the rendezvous.

Scharnhorst was unable to make contact with JW 55B, but on 26 December was intercepted, first by Burnett's cruisers, then by Fraser's heavy units, and sunk in the Battle of the North Cape, after scoring only two minor hits on both Duke of York and destroyer Saumarez. Meanwhile, contact by the U-boats had been lost, and no further contact with JW 55B was made by the Eisenbart wolfpack.

On 28 December the convoy was met by the eastern local escort force, three Soviet destroyers and two minesweepers, and arrived at Kola without further incident on 30 December 1943.

== Conclusion ==
The 19 ships of JW 55B arrived at Murmansk without loss, while the German attempt to attack the convoy had led to the loss of their last operational capital ship in Norway. Thereafter, until Tirpitz was returned to active service, the Allied Arctic convoys were under no serious threat from the German Navy's surface forces.

== Allied order of battle ==
=== Ships convoyed ===
Convoy
Name	Year	Flag	GRT	Notes
Bernard N Baker	1943	United States	7,191	
British Statesman	1923	Merchant Navy	6,991	
Brockholst Livingston	1942	United States	7,176	
Cardinal Gibbons	1942	United States	7,191	
Fort Kullyspell	1943	Merchant Navy	7,190	Commodore
Fort Nakasley	1943	Merchant Navy	7,132	Vice-commoodore
Fort Vercheres	1942	Merchant Navy	7,128	
Harold L Winslow	1943	United States	7,176	
John J Abel	1943	United States	7,191	
John Vining	1942	United States	7,191	
John Wanamaker	1943	United States	7,176	
Norlys	1936	Panama	9,892	Escort oiler
SS Ocean Gypsy	1942	Merchant Navy	7,178	
SS Ocean Messenger	1942	Merchant Navy	7,178	
SS Ocean Pride	1942	Merchant Navy	7,173	Rear-commodore
SS Ocean Valour	1942	Merchant Navy	7,174	
SS Ocean Viceroy	1942	Merchant Navy	7,174	
Thomas U. Walter	1943	United States	7,176	
Will Rogers	1942	United States	7,200	

=== Convoy escorts ===
Escorts (in relays)
Name	Flag	Type	Notes
Western local escort
HMS Hound	Royal Navy	Algerine-class minesweeper	20–22 December
HMS Hydra	Royal Navy	Algerine-class minesweeper	20–22 December
HMS Borage	Royal Navy	Flower-class corvette	20–22 December
HMS Wallflower	Royal Navy	Flower-class corvette	20–22 December
Cruiser cover
HMS Norfolk	Royal Navy	County-class cruiser	23–27 December
HMS Belfast	Royal Navy	Town-class cruiser	23–27 December
HMS Sheffield	Royal Navy	Town-class cruiser	23–27 December
Ocean escort
HMS Gleaner	Royal Navy	Halcyon-class minesweeper	20–29 December
HMS Honeysuckle	Royal Navy	Flower-class corvette	20–29 December
HMS Oxlip	Royal Navy	Flower-class corvette	20–29 December
HMS Whitehall	Royal Navy	W-class destroyer	20–29 December
HMS Wrestler	Royal Navy	W-class destroyer	20–29 December
HMS Impulsive	Royal Navy	I-class destroyer	22–29 December
HMS Onslaught	Royal Navy	O-class destroyer	22–29 December
HMS Onslow	Royal Navy	O-class destroyer	22–29 December
HMS Orwell	Royal Navy	O-class destroyer	22–29 December
HMS Scourge	Royal Navy	S-class destroyer	22–29 December
HMCS Haida	Royal Canadian Navy	Tribal-class destroyer	22–29 December
HMCS Huron	Royal Canadian Navy	Tribal-class destroyer	22–29 December
HMCS Iroquois	Royal Canadian Navy	Tribal-class destroyer	22–29 December
HMS Matchless	Royal Navy	M-class destroyer	25–26 December
HMS Musketeer	Royal Navy	M-class destroyer	25–26 December
HMS Opportune	Royal Navy	O-class destroyer	25–26 December
HMS Virago	Royal Navy	V-class destroyer	25–26 December
Distant cover (Home Fleet)
HMS Duke of York	Royal Navy	King George V-class battleship	23–27 December
HMS Jamaica	Royal Navy	Fiji-class cruiser	23–27 December
HMS Saumarez	Royal Navy	S-class destroyer	23–27 December
HMS Savage	Royal Navy	S-class destroyer	23–27 December
HMS Scorpion	Royal Navy	S-class destroyer	23–27 December
HNoMS Stord	Royal Norwegian Navy	S-class destroyer	23–27 December
Eastern local escort
HMS Halcyon	Royal Navy	Halcyon-class minesweeper	28–30 December
HMS Hussar	Royal Navy	Halcyon-class minesweeper	28–30 December

== German order of battle ==
Kriegsmarine
Name	Flag	Class	Notes
U-boats
U-314	Kriegsmarine	Type VIIC submarine	
U-354	Kriegsmarine	Type VIIC submarine	
U-387	Kriegsmarine	Type VIIC submarine	
U-601	Kriegsmarine	Type VIIC submarine	
U-716	Kriegsmarine	Type VIIC submarine	
U-957	Kriegsmarine	Type VIIC submarine	
Ships
Scharnhorst	Kriegsmarine	Scharnhorst-class battleship	
Z29	Kriegsmarine	Type 1936 destroyer	
Z30	Kriegsmarine	Type 1936 destroyer	
Z33	Kriegsmarine	Type 1936A (Mob) destroyer	
Z34	Kriegsmarine	Type 1936A (Mob) destroyer	
Z38	Kriegsmarine	Type 1936A (Mob) destroyer	

== Bibliography ==
- Kemp, Paul (1993). Convoy: Drama in Arctic Waters. London: Arms and Armour. ISBN 978-1-85409-130-7 – via Archive Foundation.
- Rohwer, Jürgen; Hümmelchen, Gerhard (2005) [1972]. Chronology of the War at Sea, 1939–1945: The Naval History of World War Two (3rd rev. ed.). London: Chatham. ISBN 978-1-86176-257-3.
- Ruegg, R.; Hague, A. (1993) [1992]. Convoys to Russia: Allied Convoys and Naval Surface Operations in Arctic Waters 1941–1945 (2nd rev. enl. ed.). Kendal: World Ship Society. ISBN 0-905617-66-5.
