= Convoy JW 55A =

Convoy JW 55A was an Arctic convoy sent from Great Britain by the Western Allies to aid the Soviet Union during World War II. It sailed in December 1943, reaching the Soviet northern ports at the end of the month. All ships arrived safely.

== Ships ==
JW 55A consisted of 19 merchant ships which departed from Loch Ewe on 12 December 1943. Close escort was provided by the destroyer Westcott and two minesweepers. There was also an Ocean escort, comprising the destroyer Milne (Capt. IMR Campbell commanding) and seven other Home Fleet destroyers. The convoy was also accompanied initially by a local escort group from Britain, and was also joined later by a local escort group from Murmansk. A cruiser cover force comprising Belfast (V.Adm R Burnett commanding), Norfolk, and Sheffield also followed the convoy, to guard against attack by surface units. Distant cover was provided by a Heavy Cover Force comprising the battleship Duke of York, the cruiser Jamaica and four destroyers under the command of V Adm. Bruce Fraser.

JW 55A was opposed by a U-boat force of eight boats in a patrol line, code-named Eisenbart, in the Norwegian Sea. A surface force comprising the battleship Scharnhorst and five destroyers was also available, stationed at Altenfjord.

== Action ==
JW 55A departed Loch Ewe on 12 December 1943, accompanied by its local escort, of two minesweepers and its close escort. Three days later it was joined by the ocean escort, while the Cruiser Force and Distant Cover Force also put to sea, taking station off Iceland. The convoy was sighted east of Bear Island by U-386 but no attack developed. The darkness of the polar night limited any action by German aircraft, and no reconnaissance aircraft found JW 55A during her voyage. Nor did Scharnhorst make any move to sortie against the convoy, though the intense German radio traffic made Fraser wary of the possibility, and his Heavy cover Force accompanied JW 55A all the way to Kola, a risky and highly unusual move. On 20 December the convoy was met by the eastern local escort, three Soviet destroyers and a British minesweeper. JW 55A arrived in Murmansk on 22 December without loss or interference.

== Conclusion ==
All 19 ships of JW 55A arrived safely, though the presence of Adm. Fraser and his force caused much suspicion among the Soviets. The German forces in Norway were discomfited by their lack of activity, and took steps to re-inforce their patrol line in the Arctic, against the next Allied convoy.

== Ships involved ==
=== Allied ships ===
Merchant ships

- Collis P Huntington
- Daniel Willard
- Empire Archer
- Empire Pickwick
- Fort Astoria
- Fort Hall
- Fort Missanabie
- Fort Thompson
- George Weems
- James A Farrell
- James Woodrow
- Lapland
- Lewis Emery Jr
- Lucerna
- Philip Livingstone
- San Ambrosia
- Stage Door Canteen
- Thistledale
- Thomas Scott

Close escort

- Westcott
- Speedwell
- Acanthus

Ocean escort

- Milne
- Matchless
- Meteor
- Musketeer
- Ashanti
- Opportune
- Virago
- Athabaskan

Cruiser cover force

- Belfast (flag)
- Norfolk
- Sheffield

Distant Cover Force

- Duke of York (flag)
- Jamaica
- Saumarez
- Savage
- Scorpion
- Stord

=== Axis ships ===
U-boat force

- U-277
- U-354
- U-387
- U-601
- U-716
- U-957

Surface force

- Scharnhorst
- Z29
- Z30
- Z33
- Z34
- Z38
