= Convoy JW 54B =

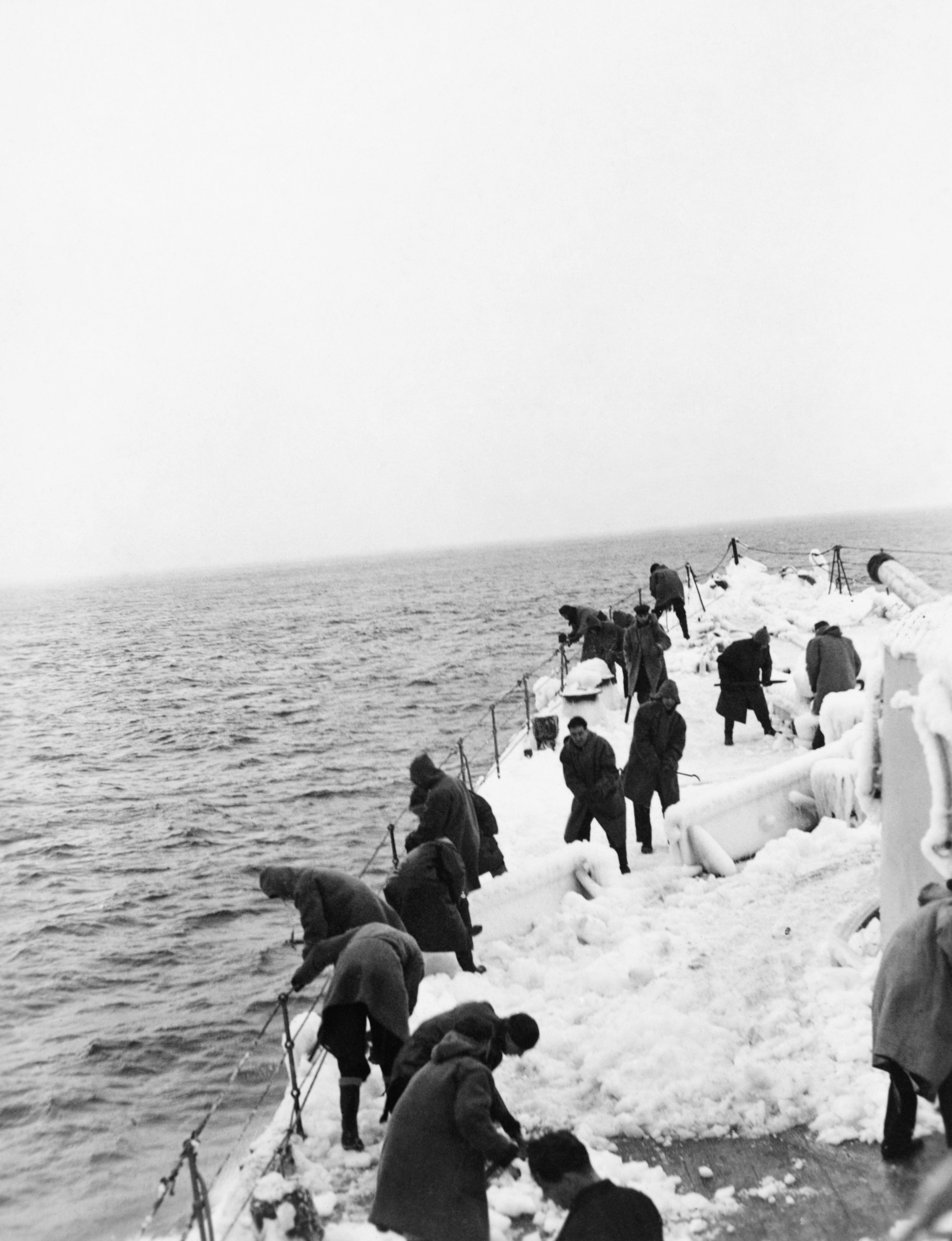
HMS Belfast, one of the expedition's ships

Convoy JW 54B was an Arctic convoy sent from Great Britain by the Western Allies to aid the Soviet Union during World War II. It sailed in late November 1943, reaching the Soviet northern ports at the end of the month. All ships arrived safely.

== Forces ==
The convoy consisted of 15 merchant ships which departed from Loch Ewe on 22 November 1943. Close escort was led by the destroyer Beagle and comprised three corvettes and a minesweeper. These were supported by an Ocean escort of eight Home Fleet destroyers led by Hardy. The convoy was also accompanied initially by a local escort group from Britain. A cruiser cover force comprising Kent, Jamaica and Bermuda also followed the convoy, to guard against attack by surface units. Distant cover was provided by a Heavy Cover Force comprising the battleship Anson, the cruiser Belfast and four destroyers.

JW 54B was opposed by a U-boat force of five boats in a patrol line, code-named Eisenbart, in the Norwegian Sea. A surface force comprising the battleship Scharnhorst and five destroyers was also available, stationed at Altenfjord.

== Voyage ==
JW 54B departed Loch Ewe on 22 November 1943, accompanied by its local escort, of three destroyers and a minesweeper, and its close escort. Three days later, on 25 November, it was joined by the ocean escort, while the local escort departed. At the same time the Cruiser Force and the Distant Cover Force, which were already at sea covering convoy JW 54A, were on station in the Norwegian Sea.

The convoy was not sighted by German reconnaissance aircraft, nor by any of the Eisenbart U-boats, and crossed the Norwegian and Barents Seas without incident.

On 3 December the Ocean escort destroyers departed, to make independent passage home, while JW 54B arrived safely at Archangel later the same day.

== Conclusion ==
JW 54B saw the safe arrival of 15 merchant ships and the war materiel they carried. Together with the 19 ships of JW 54A, which had arrived at Murmansk the previous week; this was a successful start to the 1943–44 convoy season.

== Ships involved ==
=== Allied ships ===
Merchant ships

- Arthur L Perry
- Daldorich
- Empire Lionel
- Empire Stalwart
- Eugene Field
- Fort Columbia
- Fort McMurray
- Fort Poplar
- Horace Gray
- John Fitch
- Ocean Strength
- Rathlin
- San Adolfo
- Thomas Kearns
- William L Marcy

Close escort

- Beagle
- Dianella
- Poppy
- Rhodedendron
- Halcyon

Ocean escort

- Hardy
- Saumarez
- Savage
- Scorpion
- Scourge
- Stord
- Venus
- Vigilant

Cruiser cover force

- Kent (flag)
- Jamaica
- Bermuda

Distant cover force

- Anson (flag)
- Belfast
- Ashanti
- Matchless
- Musketeer
- Obdurate

=== Axis ships ===
U-boat force

- U-277
- U-307
- U-354
- U-360
- U-387

Surface force

- Scharnhorst
- Z29
- Z30
- Z33
- Z34
- Z38
