= HMS Savage (G20) =

S-class destroyer of the Royal Navy during WWII

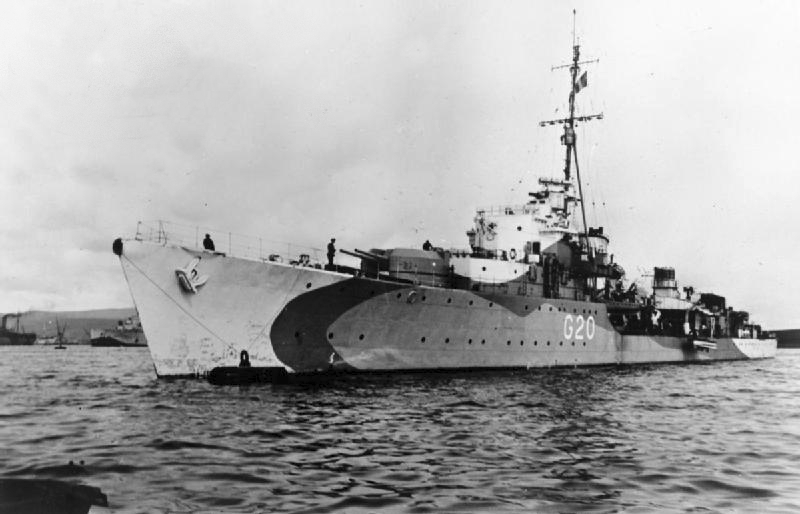
- HMS Savage at anchor in December 1943

History

United Kingdom
- Name: HMS Savage
- Ordered: 9 January 1941
- Builder: R&W Hawthorn, Leslie & Co, Hebburn
- Yard number: 651
- Laid down: 7 December 1941
- Launched: 24 September 1942
- Completed: 8 June 1943
- Identification: Pennant number: G20
- Honours and awards: Arctic 1943–44; North Cape 1943
- Fate: Broken up in Newport on 11 April 1962.
- Badge: On a Field White a savage affronte holding a club Proper

General characteristics
- Type: Destroyer
- Displacement: 1,710 long tons (1,737 t) (standard nominal); 1,780 long tons (1,809 t) (actual); 2,505 long tons (2,545 t) (deep load)
- Length: 339 ft 6 in (103.48 m) pp; 362 ft 9 in (110.57 m) oa
- Beam: 35 ft 8 in (10.87 m)
- Draught: 10 ft 0 in (3.05 m)
- Propulsion: 2 shaft Parsons geared turbines; 2 Admiralty 3-drum boilers; 40,000 shp (30,000 kW)
- Speed: 36.75 knots (68.06 km/h; 42.29 mph)
- Range: 4,675 nautical miles (8,658 km) at 20 knots (37 km/h; 23 mph)
- Complement: 179
- Sensors & processing systems: Type 272 radar fitted amidships and Type 291 radar mounted on tripod mast
- Armament: 2 × 4.5-inch (114 mm) QF Mk III guns (1×2); 2 × 4.5-inch (114 mm) QF Mk IV guns (2×1); 12 × 20 mm anti-aircraft guns (5x2 and 2x1); 8 × 21-inch (533 mm) torpedo tubes (2×4); 4 x depth charge throwers with 70 to 130 depth charges

HMS Savage was an S-class destroyer of the Royal Navy launched on 24 September 1942. The vessel was adopted by the town of Burton upon Trent. Savage differed from the rest of the class in being fitted with a new 4.5-inch (114 mm) gun, with a twin mounting for the QF Mk III gun forward and two single QF Mk IV guns aft. The twin mount was taken from spares for the aircraft carrier Illustrious. Initially serving as part of the destroyer escort screen for capital ships, Savage joined Operation Camera off the Norwegian coast, an unsuccessful diversionary expedition to distract the enemy from the invasion of Sicily, and escorted King George V from Gibraltar to Scapa Flow. However, for the majority of the ship's career, Savage escorted convoys to the Soviet Union. In December 1943, the destroyer took part in the Battle of the North Cape which saw the destruction of the German battleship Scharnhorst. After the war, Savage was refitted as gunnery training ship. The ship was decommissioned and, on 11 April 1962, sold to be broken up.

== Design and development ==
The British Admiralty ordered the eight destroyers of the S class on 9 January 1941 as the 5th Emergency Flotilla. The S class were War Emergency Programme destroyers, intended for general duties, including use as anti-submarine escort, and were to be suitable for mass-production. They were based on the hull and machinery of the pre-war J-class destroyers, but with a lighter armament in order to speed production. Savage was the second ship purchased in the flotilla and differed from the rest of the class in armament.

The S class were 362 ft 9 in (110.57 m) long overall, 348 ft 0 in (106.07 m) at the waterline and 339 ft 6 in (103.48 m) between perpendiculars, with a beam of 35 ft 8 in (10.87 m) and a draught of 10 ft 0 in (3.05 m) mean and 14 ft 3 in (4.34 m) full load. Displacement was 1,710 long tons (1,740 t) standard and 2,530 long tons (2,570 t) full load. Two Admiralty 3-drum water-tube boilers supplied steam at 300 pounds per square inch (2,100 kPa) and 630 °F (332 °C) to two sets of Parsons single-reduction geared steam turbines, which drove two propeller shafts. The machinery was rated at 40,000 shaft horsepower (30,000 kW) which gave a maximum speed of 36.75 knots (68.06 km/h; 42.29 mph) and 32 knots (59 km/h; 37 mph) at full load. The vessel carried 615 long tons (689 short tons; 625 t) of oil, giving a range of 4,675 nautical miles (8,658 km; 5,380 mi) at 20 knots (37 km/h; 23 mph).

The Admiralty had designs for a new 4.5-inch (114 mm) gun to be installed in twin and single turrets, the former for the upcoming Battle-class destroyers and the latter for the Z-class and C-class destroyers. Savage was equipped with a twin QF Mk III gun mounted forward and two single QF Mk IV guns mounted aft, replacing the single 4.7-inch (119 mm) QF Mark XII guns of her sisters.

To expedite completion still further, the twin mount was modified from a spare made for the aircraft carrier Illustrious. Due to a shortage of Hazemeyer gun mounts, the Bofors 40 mm gun was also not deployed and anti-aircraft defence was restricted to Oerlikon 20 mm cannons. However, one additional twin and two single mounts were provided, bringing the total to twelve. Two quadruple mounts for 21-inch (533 mm) torpedoes were fitted, while the ship had a depth charge outfit of four depth charge mortars and two racks, with a total of between 70 and 130 charges carried.

The destroyer was fitted with a Type 272 surface warning radar and a high-frequency direction finding (HF/DF) aerial on the ship's lattice foremast, together with a Type 291 air warning radar on a tripod mast aft. The ships' crew consisted of 179 officers and ratings.

== Construction and career ==
Savage was laid down by R&W Hawthorn, Leslie & Co, Hebburn, Newcastle upon Tyne, on 7 December 1941 and was launched on 24 September 1942. The destroyer was completed on 8 June 1943, and assigned the pennant number G20. Following a successful Warship Week campaign held in March 1942, she was adopted by the town of Burton upon Trent. The ship's badge was On a Field White a savage affronte holding a club Proper.

=== Wartime service ===
After completion, Savage joined the aircraft carrier Furious and the battleships Alabama, Anson, Duke of York, Malaya and South Dakota in Operation Camera, a diversionary manoeuvre off the Norwegian coast to distract German forces from the Allied invasion of Sicily. The diversion was not successful as it was not detected by German aircraft. Subsequently, on 25 July, Savage escorted the aircraft carriers Illustrious and Unicorn on Operation Governor, an offensive sweep off Norway. On 11 August, she joined the fleet escorting them to Gibraltar in support of the Allied invasion of Italy, and on 13 October escorted King George V from Gibraltar to Scapa Flow.

For the majority of her wartime career, Savage supported Arctic convoys.

Arctic convoys with which Savage sailed
Date convoy sailed	Convoy name	Date Savage joined convoy	Date Savage left convoy	Date convoy arrived
1 November 1943	RA 54A	3 November 1943	9 November 1943	14 November 1943
22 November 1943	JW 54B	25 November 1943	2 December 1943	3 December 1943
12 December 1943	JW 55A	18 December 1943	20 December 1943	22 December 1943
20 December 1943	JW 55B	23 December 1943	27 December 1943	30 December 1943
22 December 1943	RA 55A	23 December 1943	25 December 1943	1 January 1944
12 January 1944	JW 56A	16 January 1944	27 January 1944	28 January 1944
22 January 1944	JW 56B	29 January 1944	1 February 1944	1 February 1944
3 February 1944	RA 56	3 February 1944	7 February 1944	11 February 1944
20 February 1944	JW 57	22 February 1944	28 February 1944	28 February 1944
2 March 1944	RA 57	2 March 1944	8 March 1944	10 March 1944
11 November 1944	RA 61A	11 November 1944	17 November 1944	17 November 1944
30 December 1944	JW 63	1 January 1945	8 January 1945	8 January 1945
11 January 1945	RA 63	11 January 1945	18 January 1945	21 January 1945
17 February 1945	RA 64	21 February 1945	26 February 1945	28 February 1945
11 March 1945	JW 65	15 March 1945	21 March 1945	21 March 1945
23 March 1945	RA 65	23 March 1945	30 March 1945	1 March 1945

At the end of the war, on 12 May 1945, Savage escorted the 1st Cruiser Squadron led by Devonshire that returned Crown Prince Olav to Norway.

=== Battle of the North Cape ===
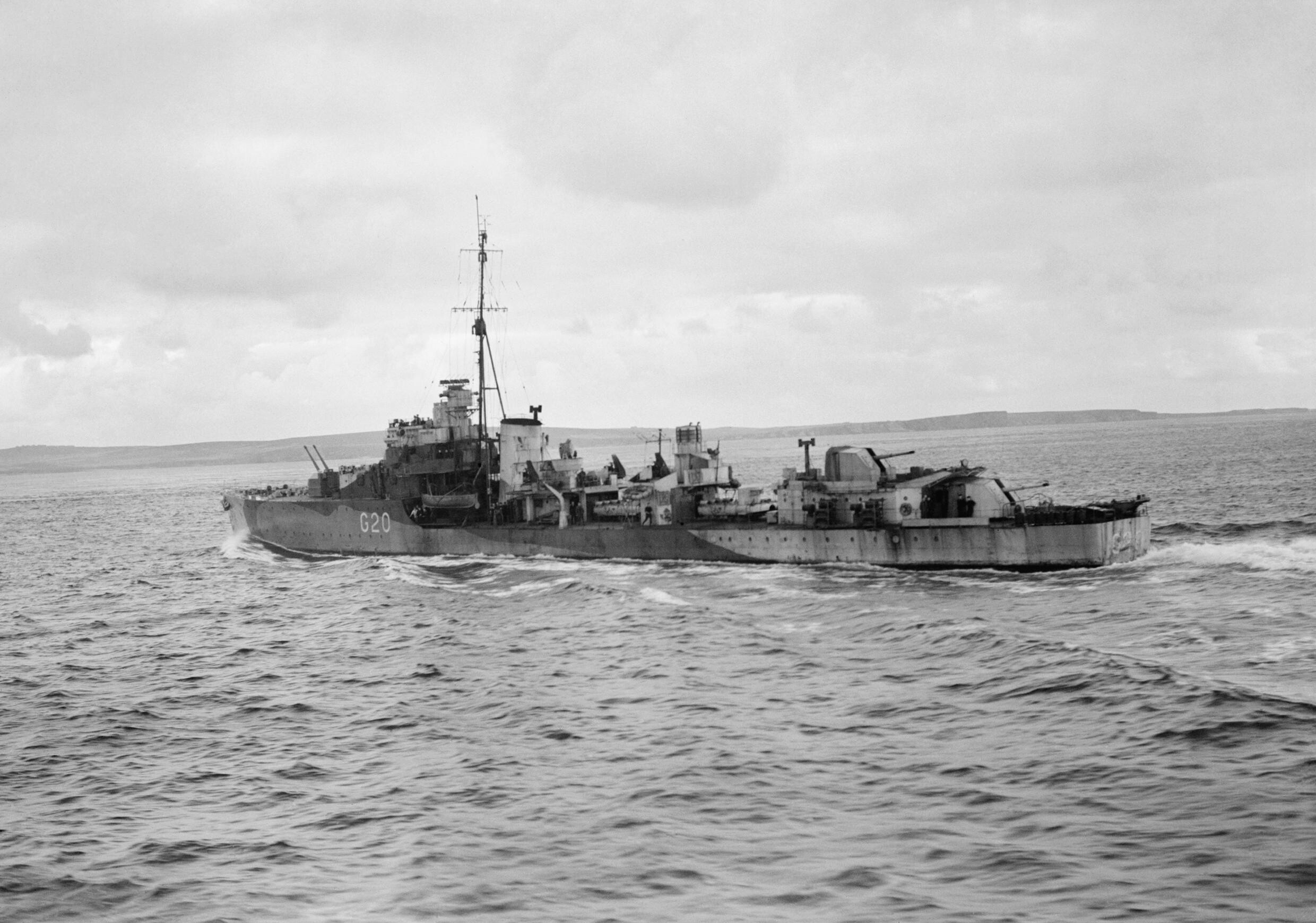
Looking weather battered and worn, the destroyer HMS Savage enters Scapa Flow after the Battle of the North Cape which resulted in the sinking of the German battleship Scharnhorst

Convoy JW 55B left Loch Ewe on 20 December 1943 and was expected to reach Bear Island on Christmas Day about the same time as Convoy RA 55A which had departed Kola two days later. Savage formed part of the destroyer screen for Force 2, the covering force led by Duke of York.

Early on 26 December the Admiralty signalled that the German battleship Scharnhorst was at sea. Savage and the rest of heavy force intercepted the German vessel as she was heading away after unsuccessfully attacking the convoy. The combination of torpedo attacks from the cruisers HMS Belfast and Jamaica and radar-directed gunfire from Duke of York and the cruisers crippled Scharnhorst. However, the battleship was able to make temporary repairs and attempted to escape. Duke of York fired star shells which illuminated the warship and the four destroyers in the screen, Saumarez, Savage, Scorpion, and the Norwegian Stord, attacked with torpedoes. Savage launched eight at a range of 3,500 yards (3,200 m) and, together with rest of the flotilla, scored at least three hits. The battle then continued until Duke of York ceased firing and Scharnhorst sank at 19:45.

=== Post war service ===
HMS Savage was refitted and redeployed as a Gunnery Firing Ship at Portsmouth after September 1945. Reduced to Reserve status at Chatham in 1948, the ship was recommissioned for trials using new designs of shafts and propellers in 1950. Although refitted and modernised, Savage was never actively deployed. The destroyer was placed on the Disposal List in 1960 and arrived at Cashmore in Newport to be broken up on 11 April 1962.
