= LÉ Macha =

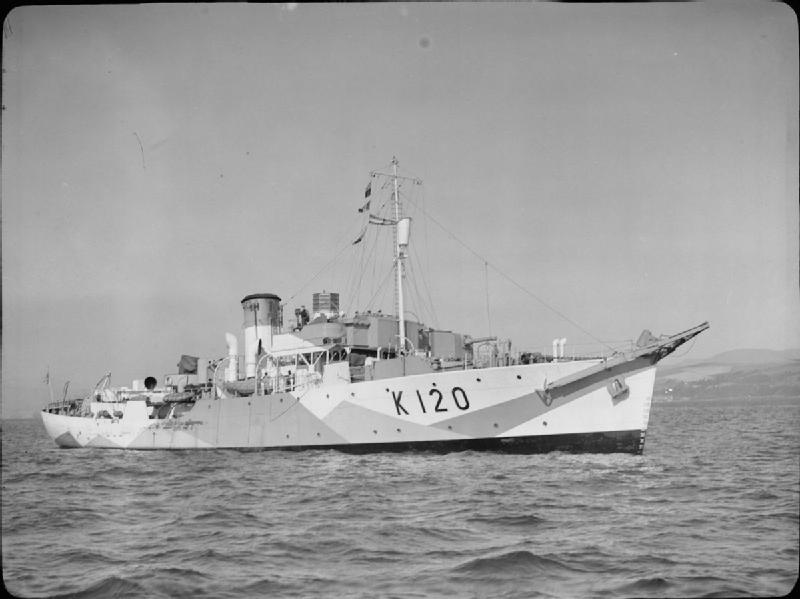
- The Macha during its time in Royal Navy service, when it was known as HMS Borage (K120)

History

United Kingdom
- Name: HMS Borage
- Namesake: Borage (herb)
- Builder: George Brown of Greenock
- Laid down: 21 November 1940
- Launched: 6 November 1941
- Completed: 29 April 1942
- Decommissioned: 15 November 1946
- Maiden voyage: 1942
- Identification: Pennant number: K120
- Fate: Sold to Ireland

Ireland
- Name: LÉ Macha
- Namesake: Macha, an ancient Irish goddess of war
- Acquired: 15 November 1946
- Decommissioned: 2 November 1970
- Identification: Pennant number: 01
- Fate: Sold for scrap 22 November 1970

General characteristics
- Class & type: Flower-class corvette
- Displacement: 1020 tons standard (1280 full load)
- Length: 205 ft (62 m)
- Beam: 33 ft (10 m)
- Depth: 14 ft (4.3 m)
- Installed power: Single reciprocating vertical 4-cylinder triple expansion by John Kincaid, Greenock.
- Propulsion: 2,759 ihp (2,057 kW) 2 cylindrical Scotch single-ended boilers. Single shaft
- Speed: 16 knots (30 km/h; 18 mph) max; 12 knots (22 km/h; 14 mph) cruise
- Complement: 5 officers, 74 ratings
- Sensors & processing systems: ASDIC; Radio; Radar; Gyrocompass; Echo sounder; Decca Navigator System
- Electronic warfare & decoys: Degaussing
- Armament: 1 × BL 4 inch Mk IX naval gun replaced in 1960 by a QF 4 inch Mk XIX naval gun; 1 × QF 2 pounder naval gun; 2 × Oerlikon 20 mm cannons; 1 × hedgehog mortar; 4 × depth-charge throwers; 2 × depth-charge racks

LÉ Macha was a ship in the Irish Naval Service. Built as a Flower-class corvette of the Royal Navy named HMS Borage, she was transferred on 15 November 1946 to the Irish Naval Service and renamed LÉ Macha after Macha, an ancient Irish goddess of war.

== HMS Borage ==
HMS Borage (K120) was a Flower-class corvette that served in the Royal Navy during World War II as escort for the Arctic convoys from 1942 to 1945 before being sold to Ireland. She was ordered in July 1939 as part of the Royal Navy's 1939 War Emergency building programme. She was laid down by George Brown & Co. of Greenock on 27 November 1940, launched on 22 November 1941 and completed on 29 April 1942. After working up and sea trials she joined Western Approaches Command for anti-submarine warfare and convoy escort duties

From July 1942 onwards Borage served with close escort groups for convoys on the North Atlantic, Gibraltar and South Atlantic routes. In three years she helped guard more than 50 merchant convoys (outbound and homebound); from these just two ships were damaged and none were lost. Borage contributed to the safe and timely arrival of more than 1,000 merchant ships. In December 1943 she was part of the close escort to convoy JW 55B, which was subject to a failed attack resulting in the sinking of the German battleship Scharnhorst. With the end of hostilities Borage was decommissioned.

In 1946 Borage was sold to the Irish Naval Service where she was commissioned as LÉ Macha. She was scrapped in November 1970.

== LÉ Macha ==
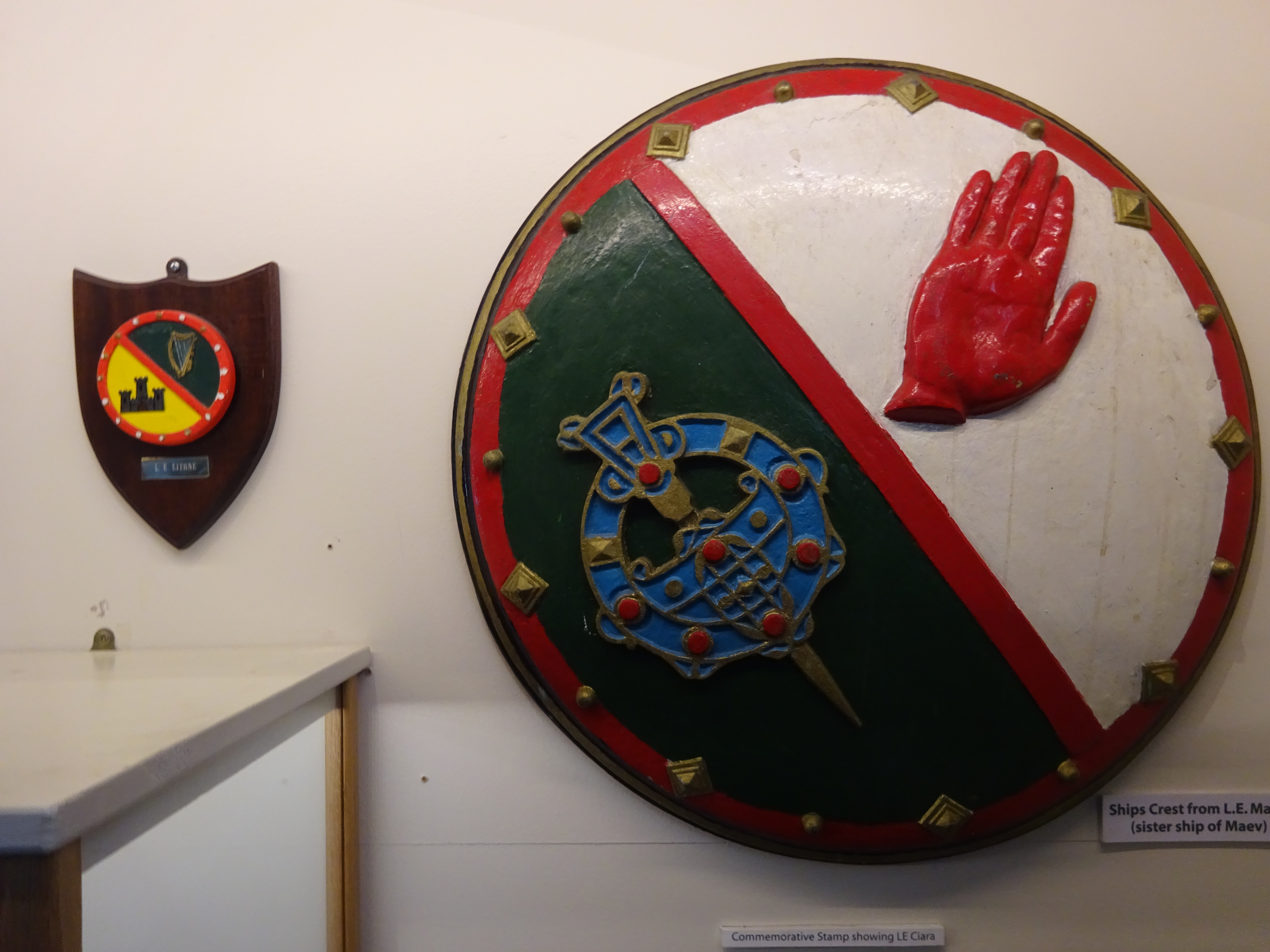
Ship's crest of the Macha, depicting the Tara Brooch and Red Hand of Ulster.

In September 1948, she had the honour of carrying the remains of William Butler Yeats from France to Drumcliffe, County Sligo, for reburial. There was a funeral march from Nice to the ship with band, trumpeters and military honours from a company of French alpine troops. It was the first time that France rendered military honours to a civilian. The remains were received at Rocquebrune near Nice by Sean Murphy, the Irish Ambassador to France.

The voyage home took 17 days. LÉ Macha stopped en route at Gibraltar and in France. The ship returned to Galway, whence the remains were carried by hearse to their final resting place in County Sligo.

LÉ Macha was sold for scrap on 22 November 1970.

== Publications ==
- Colledge, J. J.; Warlow, Ben (2006) [1969]. Ships of the Royal Navy: The Complete Record of All Fighting Ships of the Royal Navy from the 15th Century to the Present (3rd Rev ed.). London: Chatham Publishing. ISBN 978-1-86176-281-8. OCLC 67375475.
- Gardiner, Robert; Chesneau, Roger, eds. (1980). Conway's All The World's Fighting Ships 1922–1946. London: Conway Maritime Press. ISBN 0-85177-146-7.
- Elliott, Peter (1977). Allied Escort Ships of World War II: A complete survey. London: Macdonald and Jane's. ISBN 0-356-08401-9.
- Ruegg, Bob; Hague, Arnold (1993). Convoys to Russia 1941–1945. Kendal, UK: World Ship Society. ISBN 0-905617-66-5.
