= HMS Dianella =

Royal Navy World War II Flower-class corvette

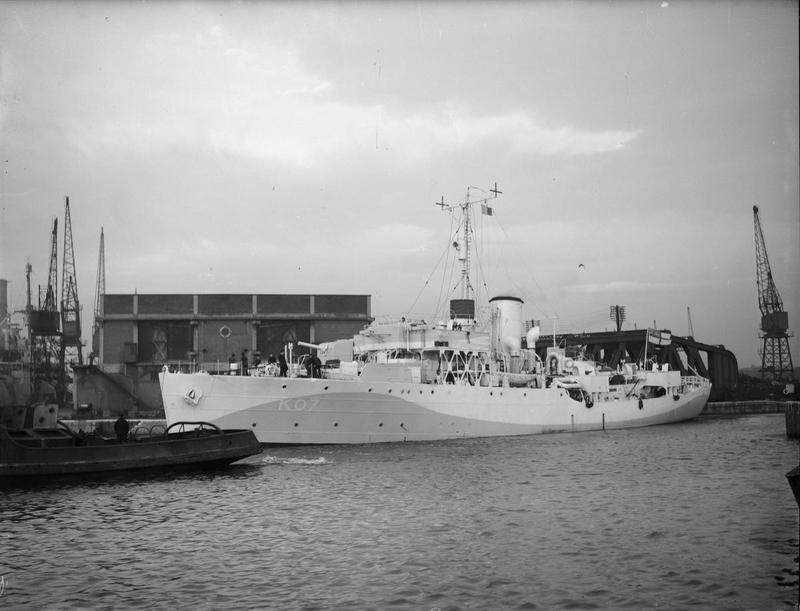
- 25 January 1943, Royal Albert Dock

History

United Kingdom
- Name: HMS Dianella
- Ordered: 25 July 1939
- Builder: John Lewis & Sons Ltd, Torry, Aberdeen
- Laid down: 8 Dec 1939
- Launched: 3 December 1940
- Commissioned: 6 January 1941
- Decommissioned: mid-1945
- Identification: Pennant number: K07
- Fate: Sold for scrap 1947

General characteristics
- Class & type: Flower-class corvette
- Displacement: 925 long tons
- Length: 205 ft (62 m) o/a
- Beam: 33 ft (10 m)
- Draught: 11 ft 6 in (3.51 m)
- Propulsion: 1 × 4-cycle triple-expansion reciprocating steam engine; 2 × fire tube Scotch boilers; Single shaft; 2,750 ihp (2,050 kW)
- Speed: 16 kn (30 km/h)
- Range: 3,500 nmi (6,500 km) at 12 kn (22 km/h)
- Complement: 85
- Sensors & processing systems: 1 × SW1C or 2C radar; 1 × Type 123A or Type 127DV sonar
- Armament: 1 × BL 4-inch (101.6 mm) Mk.IX gun; 2 × Vickers .50 cal machine gun (twin); 2 × Lewis .303 cal machine gun (twin); 2 × Mk.II Depth charge throwers; 2 × Depth charge rails with 40 depth charges

Service record
- Operations: Battle of the Atlantic; Battle of the Mediterranean; Arctic Convoys; Normandy 1944; North Atlantic 1944-45

HMS Dianella was a Flower-class corvette of the Royal Navy. She served during the Second World War.

The Flower-class corvettes were designed as a cheap and simple multi-role warship capable of being built in the multitude of small civilian shipyards not usually accustomed to building to naval standards. John Lewis, & Sons Ltd, Torry, Aberdeen was such a company that constructed coasters, drifters and cargo vessels. During the Second World War, John Lewis & Sons built more than thirty vessels, including small warships. minesweeper trawlers and patrol vessels; six of these were Flower-class corvettes.

She had been launched with the name HMS Daffodil and, unusually, this was changed to HMS Dianella on 26 October 1940 prior to commissioning.

She sailed from Aberdeen in January 1941 for Tobermory, to work-up before being sent to join a group on ocean escort of convoys. After a few weeks working-up the ship and the crew, Admiral Stephenson would inspect each escort and put the captain and crew through a stiff test before releasing them for operational service. Anti-submarine trial exercises were conducted on 11 February.

== Service history ==
=== Battle of the Atlantic ===
From February until July 1941 she was escorting convoys to and from Liverpool to Gibraltar and Freetown. A major action with other groups was between 19 July – 1 August 1941 with Convoy ON 69 defending 26 merchant ships from 8 U-boats and 2 Italian submarines.

In mid-1941 Western Approaches Command had formed 8 escort groups. The 1st Escort Group consisted of six destroyers and four Flower-class corvettes.

In February and March 1942 the original eight escort groups were reorganized into the Mid-Ocean Escort Force (MOEF).

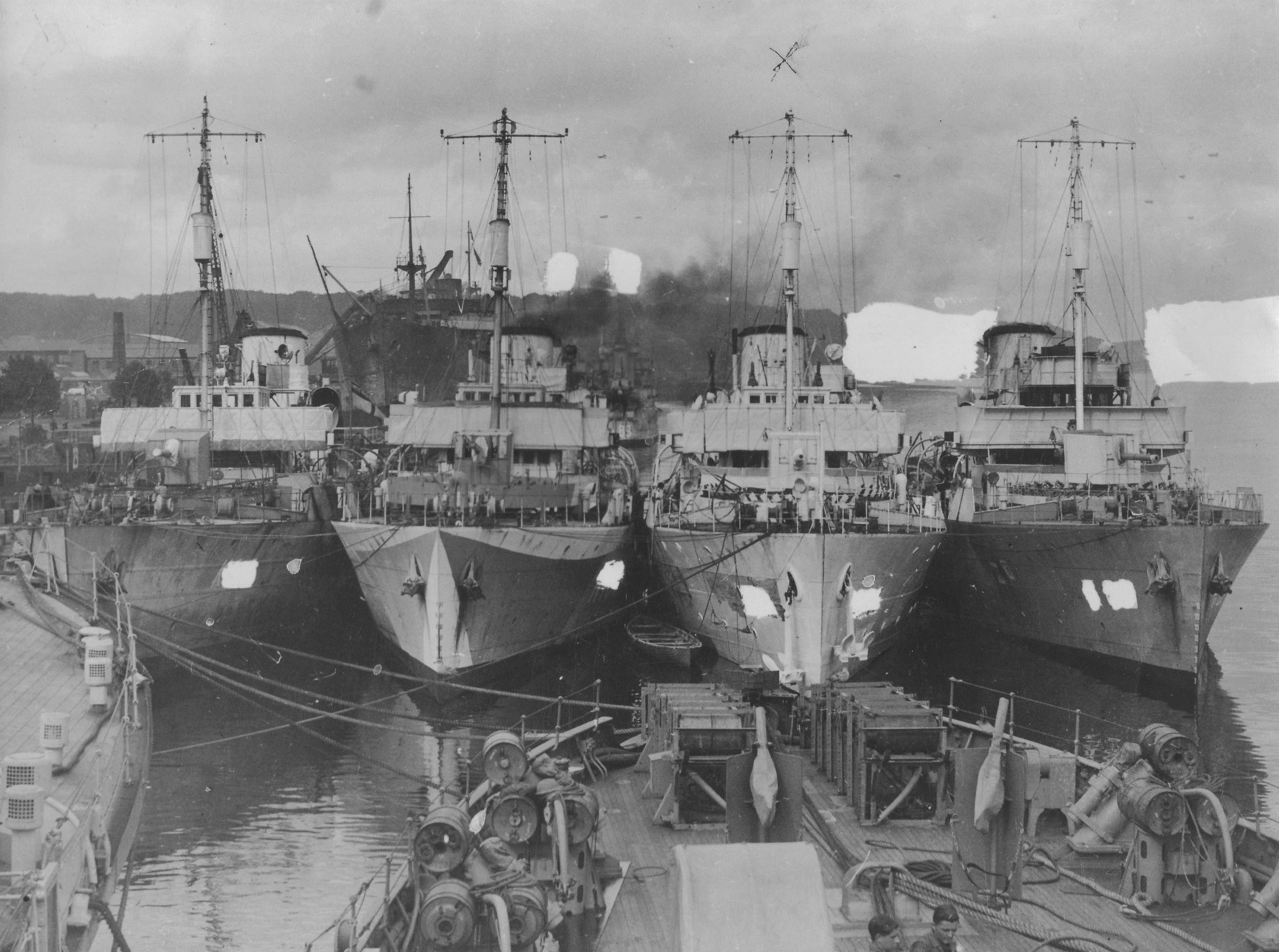
Corvettes of B7 Group moored in Londonderry. Alisma, Dianella, Sunflower & Kingcup. The white areas are where the official censor has painted out security sensitive material

Dianella was part of Escort Group B7, one of seven such British naval groups which served with the Mid-Ocean Escort Force (MOEF). It provided convoy protection in the most dangerous midsection of the North Atlantic route. B7's first convoys, in the spring of 1942, were uneventful.

=== Arctic convoy ===
In June 1942 she sailed with the ill-fated Convoy PQ 17 which departed from Reykjavík, Iceland bound for northern Russia. The ship came under sustained attack from U-boats and aircraft first contact with the enemy occurred on 1 July 1942. The admiralty had knowledge of German heavy surface units had been deployed from Trondheim (battleship Tirpitz, heavy cruiser Admiral Hipper) and Narvik (pocket battleships Lützow, Admiral Scheer) but had not been detected at sea. Close cover force, which was no match for the German heavy ships, was ordered to withdraw to the west and the convoy was ordered to scatter and proceed individually to Russian ports for fear of imminent attack. During a week of daylight U-boat and aircraft attacks, convoy PQ 17 lost 24 of its 35 merchant ships.

=== Battle of the Mediterranean ===
On her return Daniella was assigned, with the Arctic corvettes Lotus, Poppy and Starwort, to escort duties in the Mediterranean, initially in support of Operation Torch, the Allied invasion of North Africa between 8–16 November 1942. These four corvettes served together for the remainder of the war at sea. In July 1943 the escort group were supporting Operation Husky, the invasion of Sicily, and this continued until the end of October.

=== Arctic convoys ===
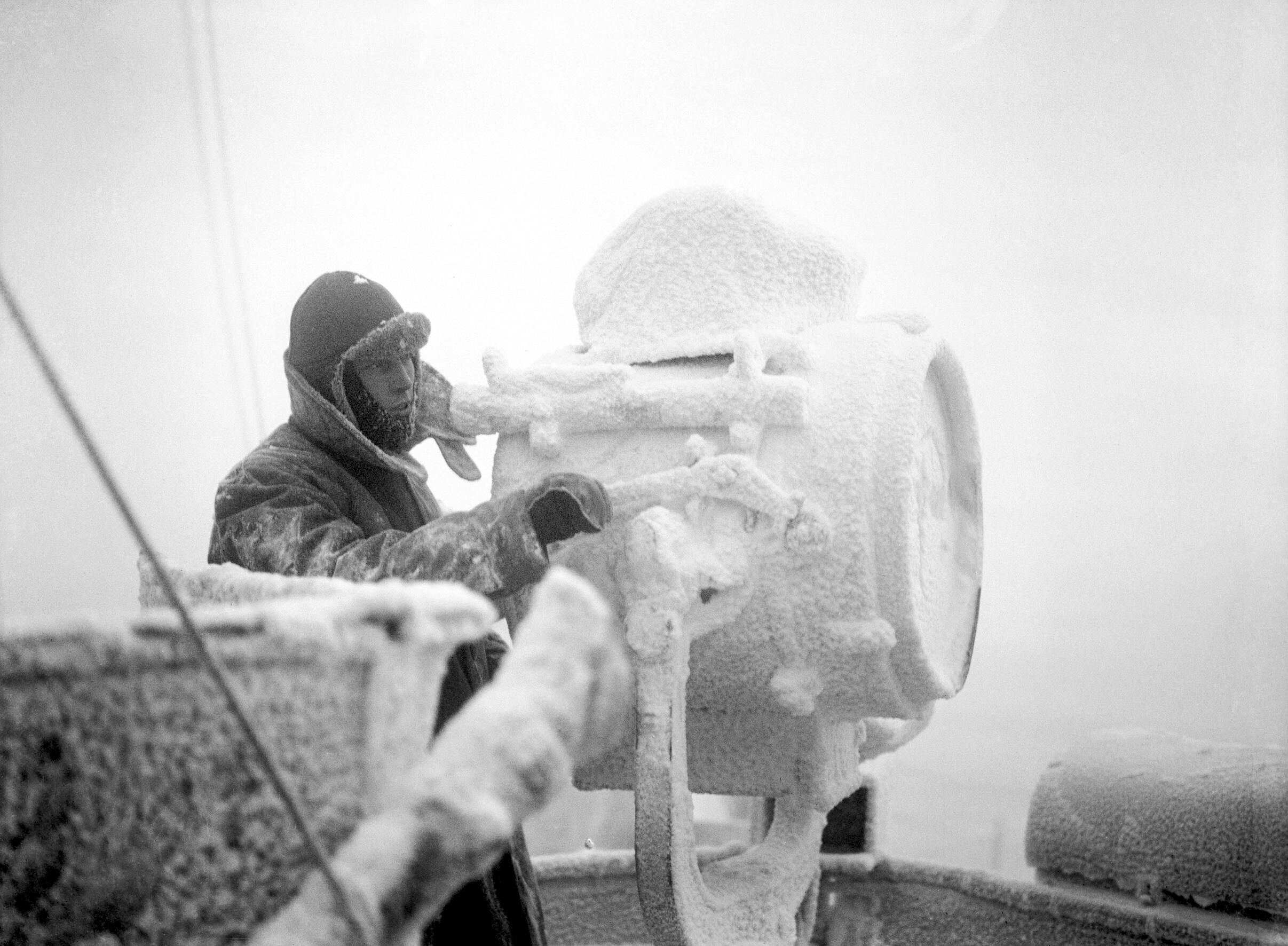
The weather was the enemy

From November 1943 until March 1944 would probably be the most challenging war service for the Daniella - the Arctic in winter.

- Convoy JW 54B (Nov 1943: Loch Ewe - Archangel)
- Convoy RA 55A (Dec 1943: Kola Inlet - Loch Ewe)
- Convoy JW 56A (Jan 1944: Loch Ewe - Kola Inlet)
- Convoy RA 56 (Feb 1944: Kola Inlet - Loch Ewe)
- Convoy JW 57 (Feb 1944: Loch Ewe - Kola Inlet)

Loch Ewe was used as an assembly point for the Arctic Convoys during the war. Ships from the British, American and other ports gathered here before sailing to Murmansk from September 1942 following the disaster of Convoy PQ 17 in order to confuse German intelligence. Kola Bay or Murmansk Fjord is a 57-km-long fjord of the Barents Sea; the ports of Murmansk and Polyarny, the main base of Russia's Northern Fleet, flank the sides of the bay.

=== Normandy 1944 ===
In April she was transferred to the English Channel with Escort Group 105 in support of Operation Neptune, the landing operations in Normandy. Between 4 and 6 June 1944 Escort Group 105 (HMS Wanderer, HMS Tavy, HMS Dianella and HMS Geranium) and the Royal Canadian Navy corvettes Summerside, Woodstock and Regina escorted Convoy EBM2, composed of 30 American supply ships and five others, from the Clyde to the Western Task Force unloading area off Omaha Beach, arriving on D-day plus one.

=== The North Atlantic ===
From September 1944 until June 1945 Dianella escorted fourteen convoys between Liverpool and New York.

=== Summary ===
In the course of the war HMS Dianella had escorted seventy two convoys from the North Cape, the northernmost point of Europe (71°10′21″N) to Freetown on the west coast of Africa (8°29′4″N) and west to New York (73°56′38″W).

== Fate ==
She was sold to J. Lee in early 1947, and arrived for scrapping at Portaferry, Northern Ireland, on 24 June 1947.

== Sources ==
- Elliott, Peter (1977). Allied Escort Ships of World War II. ISBN 0-356-08401-9.
- Colledge, J. J.; Warlow, Ben (2006) [1969]. Ships of the Royal Navy: The Complete Record of all Fighting Ships of the Royal Navy (Rev. ed.). London: Chatham Publishing. ISBN 978-1-86176-281-8. OCLC 67375475.
