= HMS Saumarez (G12) =

1943 S-class destroyer of the Royal Navy

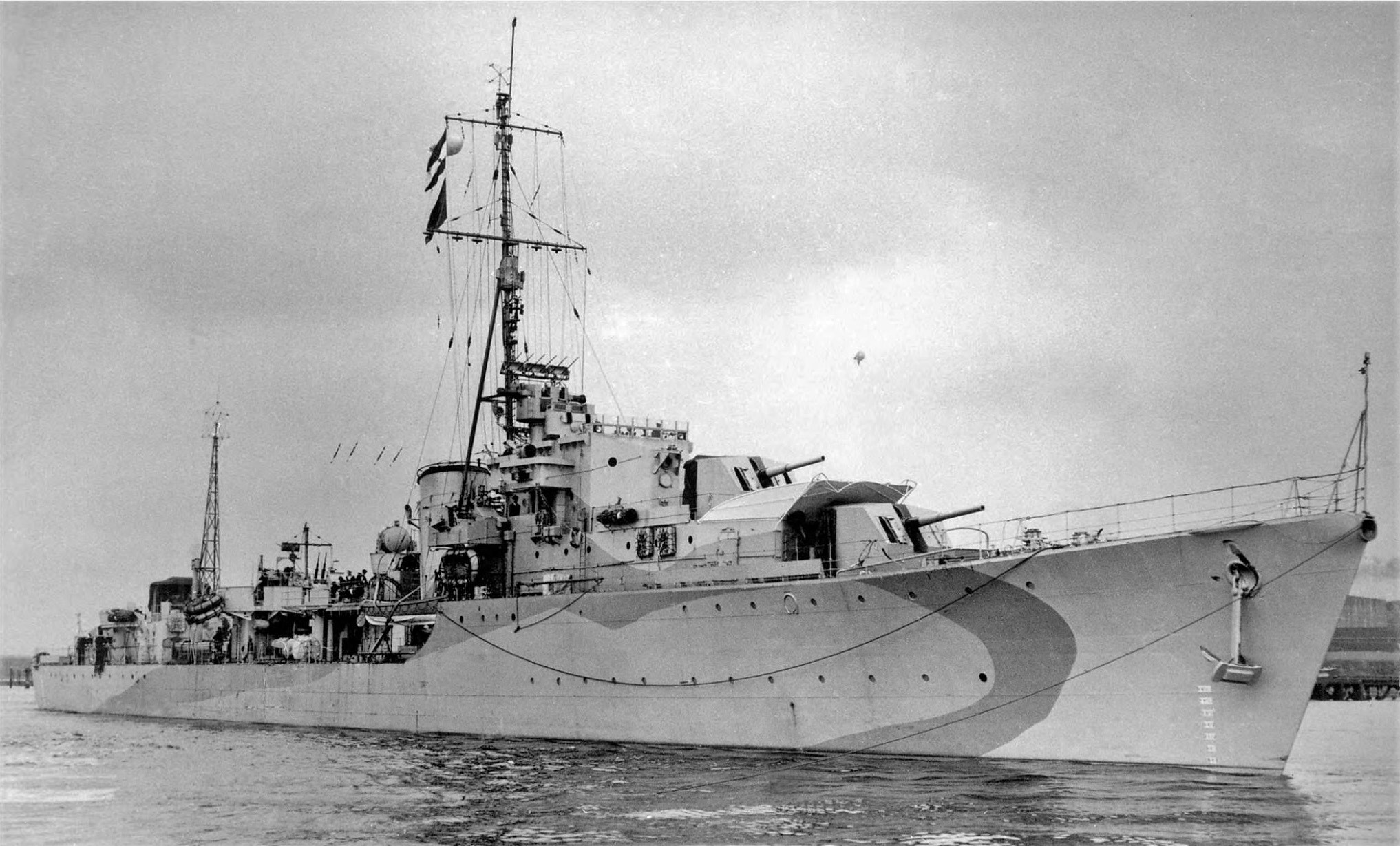

History

United Kingdom
- Name: HMS Saumarez
- Namesake: James Saumarez, 1st Baron de Saumarez
- Ordered: January 1941
- Builder: Hawthorn Leslie, Hebburn, Newcastle upon Tyne
- Launched: 20 November 1942
- Commissioned: 1 July 1943
- Identification: Pennant number: G12
- Honours and awards: Arctic 1943-44; North Cape 1943; Normandy 1944; Malaya 1945; Burma 1945
- Fate: Heavily damaged by mine on 22 October 1946; Written off as a constructive total loss and sold on 8 September 1950 for scrapping; Broken up in Charlestown, Fife in October 1950.
- Badge: On a Field White, within a crescent Red a leopard's face black

General characteristics
- Class & type: S-class destroyer
- Displacement: 1,730 tons (standard)
- Length: 363 ft (111 m)
- Beam: 35 ft (11 m)
- Draught: 14 ft (4.3 m)
- Propulsion: Two sets of Parsons geared turbines; 40,000 hp (30,000 kW)
- Speed: 36.75 knots (68.06 km/h; 42.29 mph)
- Complement: 225
- Armament: 4 × 4.7-inch (120-mm) QF Mk IX guns (4×1); 2 × 40mm Bofors (1x2); 8 × 20 mm guns anti-aircraft guns; 8 × 21-inch (533 mm) torpedo tubes (2×4)

HMS Saumarez was an S-class destroyer of the Royal Navy, completed on 1 July 1943. As a flotilla leader, her standard displacement was 20 tons heavier than other ships of her class. She continued the tradition of flotilla leaders being named after prominent British seamen, in her case Vice-Admiral James Saumarez, 1st Baron de Saumarez of the late 18th and early 19th centuries.

== World War II ==
=== Arctic convoys ===
After working up, the Saumarez was allocated to the 3rd Destroyer Flotilla, Home Fleet, and shortly after to the 23rd Destroyer Flotilla, working with the Arctic convoys. She was one of the escorts which sailed from Seyðisfjörður, Iceland on 23 October, taking with them five Russian minesweepers and six Russian motor launches, to bring back from the Kola Inlet thirteen ships which had been there since the Spring. The convoy (RA 54A) sailed from Arkhangelsk on 1 November and arrived in United Kingdom ports on 13 and 14 November without loss, although it had been delayed by thick fog. Saumarez escorted an outgoing Arctic convoy shortly afterwards, which also arrived without loss or damage.

=== Battle of North Cape ===
On 22 December Convoy RA 55A sailed from Kola, escorted by eight destroyers, including Saumarez, two Canadian destroyers, three corvettes and a minesweeper. The outgoing convoy, JW 55B, had left Loch Ewe on 20 December and was expected to reach Bear Island on Christmas Day about the same time as RA 55A. Cruiser cover was provided east of Bear Island by Belfast, Sheffield and Norfolk, and heavy cover by the battleship Duke of York and the cruiser Jamaica.

Enigma intelligence alerted the Admiralty to the fact that Scharnhorst was being deployed, and early on 25 December allied ships were so informed. She was detected by the cruisers and after some hours trying to evade them and strike at the convoy, headed for home. The German vessel was intercepted and hit by Duke of York and a long chase followed. In the ensuing action, Saumarez's guns fired continuously for eleven minutes, followed by torpedo attacks. A shell from Scharnhorst, which did not explode, passed through the Director Control Tower, killing eleven men and putting the tower out of action. A near miss also damaged the forced lubrication system. Duke of York and the cruisers sank Scharnhorst, three hours after the first sighting. The four destroyers, Saumarez, Savage, Scorpion and the Norwegian Stord had scored at least three hits.

Saumarez steamed to Murmansk on one engine and after temporary repairs by the Soviets left for the UK. Following a refit, completed in March 1944, she was again part of the escort of a pair of Arctic convoys, JW 58 and RA 58, both of which reached their destinations unscathed. The successful Fleet Air Arm attack on the German battleship Tirpitz, which took place on 3 April, was synchronised with the passage of JW 58.

=== Normandy ===
In Operation Neptune, the landings in Normandy in June 1944, Saumarez was Senior Officer's ship of the 23rd Destroyer Flotilla, which gave naval gun fire support as part of Force S in the assault on Ouistreham. Saumarez and the destroyer Onslaught engaged a convoy of three or four minesweepers and one merchant vessel off St Peter Port, Guernsey on 14 August. The convoy was frequently hit and both destroyers sustained slight damage and casualties.

In September Saumarez was part of the escort of another Arctic convoy. She was refitted at Newcastle from November to January 1945, prior to joining the 26th Destroyer Flotilla, British East Indies Fleet.

=== Far East ===
Early in January 1945, Saumarez left from the Clyde to rendezvous with the aircraft carrier Formidable and escort her from Alexandria to Colombo. She arrived at Colombo on 8 February and Trincomalee on 10 March. On 11 March Saumarez took part in a sweep in the Andaman Sea, with the destroyers Volage and Rapid. They found and destroyed a junk in Stewart Sound, but Rapid and Volage sustained damage and casualties from hits from a coastal gun reported to be 6 inch or larger. On 25 March, a further sweep was made. A Japanese convoy was sighted the next day and engaged. Although the destroyers attacked with gunfire and torpedoes they made few hits and, being low on ammunition, called on two Liberator bombers to sink the enemy. One of these sank one of the Japanese auxiliary, Risui with bombs. Volage sank the other auxiliary, Teshio Maru, with gunfire. Both escorts were also sunk. Saumarez was in Force 63 in April, when she bombarded Oleelhoe, Sumatra.

She was part of the escorting destroyers of the 21st Aircraft Carrier Squadron that took part in Operation Dracula from April to May 1945. She was part of the Carrier Force in Operation Bishop, formed to protect the convoys in the seaborne assault on Rangoon, and then took part in Operation Dukedom, which was mounted to attack a Japanese naval force reported sailing from Singapore on 10 May 1945. On this occasion, she was part of the newly constituted Force 61. The Japanese cruiser Haguro and destroyer Kamikaze had left the Malacca Strait on 14 May and early next day a Grumman Avenger torpedo bomber operating from the escort aircraft carrier HMS Emperor sighted them. Saumarez, Verulam and Vigilant in one division and Venus and Virago in a second, were diverted to intercept. The destroyers attacked both ships early on 16 May. Haguro, overwhelmed by their torpedoes, went to the bottom at 0209 in a position some forty-five miles southwest of Penang, although she had straddled Saumarez twice prior. Kamikaze was damaged but managed to escape.

== Post-war ==
Saumarez was refitted at Durban from June to August. Although Japan had formally surrendered on 2 September, the occupation of Western Malaya (Operation Zipper) was carried out almost as planned originally. Saumarez was one of the fifteen destroyers screening the operation. The 26th Destroyer Flotilla left the East Indies Headquarters at Colombo on 17 November and arrived in the UK early in December. Saumarez went to Plymouth for refit and preparation for service in the Mediterranean.

Early in March 1946 Saumarez sailed for the Mediterranean, for service in the 3rd Destroyer Flotilla. In June she intercepted a caïque carrying 382 illegal immigrants bound for Palestine and towed the caique to Haifa. A boarding party from Saumarez also arrested SS Hochelaga off Haifa on 31 July, carrying 500 immigrants.

=== Corfu Channel incident ===
On 26 September 1946, she sailed on a Mediterranean cruise with twenty-four other ships. Orders were given for a part of the 1st Cruiser Squadron to pass through the Corfu Strait, from south to north. On 22 October the Saumarez, preceded by the cruisers Mauritius and the New Zealand Leander, followed by the destroyer Volage, proceeded through the swept Medri channel. Saumarez struck a mine at 14:53, which caused severe damage and 30 deaths among her crew. Damage control parties led by the ship's second-in-command, Teddy Gueritz, helped to minimise the casualty numbers. Volage closed her to take her in tow and after some difficulty, passed the tow and began to tow Saumarez stern first. Although his jaw had been broken by the explosion, Saumarez's signal officer, John Edmondson assisted in securing the tow. At 16:06 however, a mine exploded near Volage, wrecking the ship forward. She was able to re-connect the tow to Saumarez, and the two destroyers, both stern-first, reached the Corfu Roads at 03:10 on 23 October.

Saumarez was then moved to Malta, where she remained until September 1950. In February 1948 approval to scrap Saumarez was given. On 23 August 1950 the hulk arrived at Gibraltar. She was then towed back to the UK and broken up at Rosyth.

== Publications ==
- Colledge, J. J.; Warlow, Ben & Bush, Steve (2020). Ships of the Royal Navy: The Complete Record of all Fighting Ships of the Royal Navy from the 15th Century to the Present (5th revised and updated ed.). Seaforth Publishing. ISBN 978-1-5267-9327-0.
- Critchley, Mike (1982). British Warships Since 1945: Part 3: Destroyers. Maritime Books. ISBN 0-9506323-9-2.
- Kinross, John (2001). "Draft Action Report: HMS Saumarez, January 1944". Mariner's Mirror. 87 (3): 325–334. doi:10.1080/00253359.2001.10656805. ISSN 2049-680X.
- Lenton, H. T. (1998). British & Empire Warships of the Second World War. Naval Institute Press. ISBN 1-55750-048-7.
- Raven, Alan & Roberts, John (1978). War Built Destroyers O to Z Classes. Bivouac Books. ISBN 0-85680-010-4.
- Whitley, M. J. (2000). Destroyers of World War Two: An International Encyclopedia. Cassell & Co. ISBN 1-85409-521-8.
