= HMS Scorpion (G72) =

WWII-era British Royal Navy destroyer

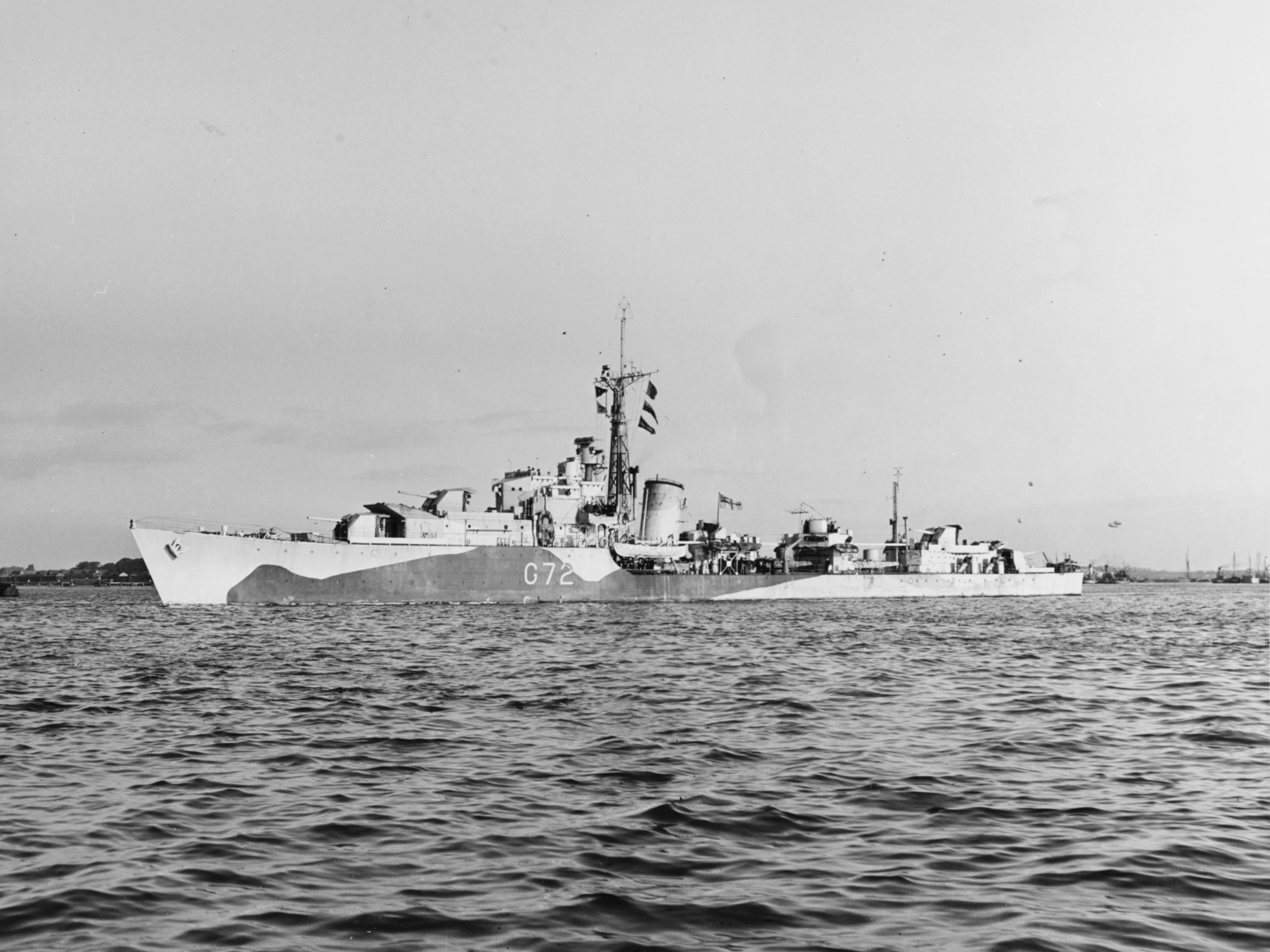
- HMS Scorpion in June 1944

History

United Kingdom
- Name: HMS Scorpion
- Ordered: 9 January 1941
- Builder: Cammell Laird, Birkenhead
- Laid down: 19 June 1941
- Launched: 26 August 1942
- Commissioned: 11 May 1943
- Decommissioned: 16 August 1945
- Identification: Pennant number: G72
- Motto: Finem espice - Look to the end
- Honours and awards: Arctic 1943-44; North Cape 1943; Normandy 1944
- Fate: Sold to the Dutch in October 1945
- Badge: On a Field barry wavy of six white and blue, a scorpion gold.

Netherlands
- Name: HNLMS Kortenaar
- Acquired: October 1945
- Reclassified: Frigate, 1957
- Identification: D804 and later F812
- Fate: Scrapped 1963

General characteristics
- Class & type: S-class destroyer
- Displacement: 1,730 tons (standard)
- Length: 363 ft (111 m)
- Beam: 35 ft (11 m)
- Draught: 14 ft (4.3 m)
- Propulsion: Two sets of Parsons geared turbines; 40,000 hp (30,000 kW)
- Speed: 36.75 knots (68.06 km/h; 42.29 mph)
- Complement: 225
- Armament: 4 × 4.7-inch (120-mm) QF Mk IX guns (4×1); 2 × 40mm Bofors (1x2); 8 × 20 mm guns anti-aircraft guns; 8 × 21-inch (533 mm) torpedo tubes (2×4)

HMS Scorpion was an S-class destroyer of the Royal Navy, the eleventh of her name, commissioned on 11 May 1943. Initially she was to be named Sentinel, but this was changed following the loss of the Dragonfly-class river gunboat Scorpion in the Bangka Strait in February 1942. She served in the Royal Navy during the Second World War, mostly in the Arctic Ocean, and fought in the Battle of North Cape. She was sold to the Netherlands in 1945 and scrapped in 1963.

== War time service ==
=== Home Fleet and convoy escort ===
Scorpion joined the 23rd Destroyer Flotilla of the Home Fleet at Scapa Flow on 11 May 1943 and was deployed on patrol in the Northwestern Approaches. On 20 October she joined an escort group of nine destroyers, a Norwegian corvette and two minesweepers which sailed to the Kola Inlet as part of Operation FR, tasked to bring back merchant ships that had been waiting in Russian ports over the summer while the Arctic Convoys were suspended.

Covered by dense fog, convoy RA 54A arrived safely in Loch Ewe on 14 November, while the destroyer flotilla turned around to escort Convoy JW 54B to Archangel. She returned to Scapa Flow, but was out again on 10 December to screen the battleship Duke of York and cruiser Jamaica which had been ordered to sea to cover Convoy JW 55A. The Kriegsmarine did not emerge and so she sailed with the battleship all the way through to the Kola Inlet, an unusual and risky move that surprised the Russians.

=== Battle of the North Cape ===
Scorpion covered Duke of York as she returned west to refuel in Akureyri in Iceland on 21 December 1943. The Home Fleet left Iceland on 23 December to cover Convoy RA 55A and Convoy JW 55A, alerted of German intentions to intercept one of the convoys by Ultra intelligence. On 26 December the German battleship Scharnhorst, escorted by five destroyers, attempted to attack the ships of Convoy JW 55A, but were driven away by Admiral Burnett's three light cruisers and then cut off by Admiral Fraser's force. During the action Duke of York hit Scharnhorst's starboard boiler room with a 14-inch shell, slowing her briefly to 10 knots (19 km/h; 12 mph) as she attempted to evade the British fleet.

This provided the destroyers with an opportunity to attack with torpedoes. Closing from astern, Saumarez and Savage fired star-shells, blinding the Germans to the approach of Scorpion and the Norwegian Stord on the starboard side of the battleship. The two destroyers launched 16 torpedoes, scoring one hit, and driving Scharnhorst into firing range of Saumarez and Savage, which scored two more hits. This crippled the German ship and allowed the slower Duke of York to catch up and sink her. After the battle Scorpion picked up 30 survivors and sailed on to the Kola Inlet, arriving there on 27 December. She returned to Scapa Flow with the rest of the fleet on New Year's Eve.

=== Operation Neptune ===
In March 1944 Scorpion was assigned to the "Ocean Escort" force for Convoy JW 58, one of the largest Arctic convoys of the war. All ships arrived safely and Scorpion returned with Convoy RA 58. Scorpion was then assigned to Force S, alongside several other S-class destroyers, part of the fleet for the Normandy landings. During May she took part in preparatory exercises before sailing to Spithead early in June. She crossed the channel on 5 June and took up position off Ouistreham to bombard targets in support of Allied landing forces in the Queen Sector of Sword Beach. On 7 June she was assigned to patrol the Eastern Task Force area following the loss of her sister ship, the Norwegian Svenner to German T-boats. On 9 June she was detached with Scourge to reinforce the O-class destroyer flotilla against the threat posed by the German heavy destroyers from Brest. She spent the rest of June, July and August on patrol in the English Channel protecting convoys from E-boats.

=== Arctic convoys ===
Scorpion returned to escorting the Arctic convoys in September 1944, screening the battleship Rodney in support of Convoy JW 60 and then Convoy RA 60. In October she was diverted to support Operation Lycidas, screening two escort carriers, Fencer and Trumpeter, as they carried out aerial minelaying around the Norwegian coast. In November, sailing with Savage, she carried Norwegian troops to the Kola Inlet (Operation Freeman), their role being to join Red Army as it pushed the Germans away from Murmansk back into Norway, lending authority to the Norwegian Government in exile. She then joined the escort for Convoy RA 60A on 11 November. Later in the month she supported two more operations with escort carriers off the Norwegian coast near Karmøy on 20 November (Operation Handfast) and then near Mosjøen on 27 November.

She escorted Convoy JW 63 over the New Year period, her anti-aircraft gunners accidentally shooting at (and missing) two Wildcats which had been launched to intercept a German aircraft. She escorted four more Arctic convoys early in 1945, RA 63 in January, RA 64 in February, and JW 65 and RA 65 in March. She was also deployed to support three more operations in the North Sea in February, Operations Selenium, Shred and Groundsheet. She continued in service with the Home Fleet until VJ Day in August 1945 when she was placed in reserve.

== Post war ==
In October 1945 Scorpion was sold to the Dutch Navy and renamed Kortenaer, serving as a destroyer until 1957 when she was converted to a fast frigate. She was broken up in 1963.
