= HMS Wallflower =

Two ships of the Royal Navy have been named HMS Wallflower:

- HMS Wallflower (1915) was an Arabis-class sloop launched in 1915 and sold in 1931
- HMS Wallflower (K44) was a Flower-class corvette, launched in 1940 and sold in 1946
