= HMS Norfolk (78) =

Cruiser of the Royal Navy

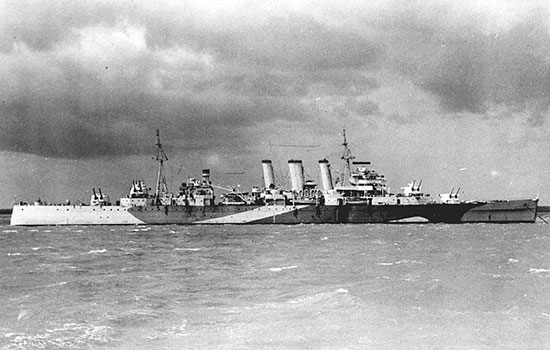
- Norfolk in wartime camouflage. As she still has an X turret, this photo is pre-1944.

History

United Kingdom
- Name: HMS Norfolk
- Namesake: Norfolk
- Builder: Fairfield Shipbuilding & Engineering Co. Ltd, Govan
- Laid down: 8 July 1927
- Launched: 12 December 1928
- Commissioned: 30 April 1930
- Identification: Pennant number: 78
- Honours and awards: Atlantic 1941; Bismarck Action 1941; North Africa 1942; Arctic 1943; North Cape 1943; Norway 1943
- Fate: Sold for scrapping on 3 January 1950

General characteristics
- Class & type: County-class heavy cruiser
- Displacement: 9,925 long tons (10,084 t) (standard); 13,450 long tons (13,670 t) (full load)
- Length: 632 ft 7 in (192.81 m)
- Beam: 66 ft (20 m)
- Draught: 17 ft (5.2 m)
- Installed power: 80,000 shp (60,000 kW)
- Propulsion: 4 × Parsons Brown-Curtis geared steam turbines; 8 × boilers; 4 × shafts
- Speed: 32.25 knots (59.73 km/h; 37.11 mph)
- Range: 12,370 nmi (14,240 mi; 22,910 km) at 14 knots (26 km/h; 16 mph)
- Complement: 710
- Armament: 8 × 8 in (203 mm) guns (4x2); 8 × 4 in (102 mm) guns (4x2); 16 × 2 pdr guns (2x8)
- Armour: magazines: up to 2.5 in (64 mm); Turrets: 1 in (25 mm)
- Aircraft carried: 2 × Supermarine Walrus flying boats (operated by 700 Naval Air Squadron)

HMS Norfolk was a County-class heavy cruiser of the Royal Navy. The ship was the lead ship of the Norfolk-subclass of which only two were built: Norfolk and Dorsetshire. She served throughout the Second World War. During 1939-41 she operated in the Atlantic against German raiders and blockade runners. In March 1940 she was damaged by a German dive bomber in the anchorage of Scapa Flow.

In May 1941 Norfolk and her sister ship Suffolk detected the German battleship Bismarck and the heavy cruiser Prinz Eugen while on patrol in Denmark Strait. The two cruisers guided the battleship Prince of Wales and the battlecruiser Hood to the German ships, but in the Battle of the Denmark Strait on 24 May, Hood was sunk and both Prince of Wales and Bismarck were damaged. Norfolk and Suffolk kept contact with the German ships and guided the Home Fleet to the scene. Norfolk directed a torpedo bomber attack from Victorious to the Bismarck, but these aircraft could only score one insignificant hit on Bismarck. Finally Bismarck shook off the shadowing Norfolk, Suffolk and Prince of Wales, and headed to port in France. When Bismarck was found back on 26 May, Norfolk was one of the few ships left with enough fuel to continue the pursuit of Bismarck. In the evening of 26 May, torpedo bombers from the aircraft carrier Ark Royal rendered Bismarck steerless, allowing her pursuers to catch up. In the morning of 27 May, the battleships Rodney and King George V, Norfolk and the heavy cruiser Dorsetshire destroyed the Bismarck with gunfire and torpedoes.

From 1942 onwards she operated in the Arctic, usually as part of the close covering force of Arctic convoys to Russia, where she was involved in the sinking of the German battleship Scharnhorst during the Battle of the North Cape. After the war, Norfolk was sent to the East Indies as flagship. In 1949 she returned to Britain, was placed in reserve and scrapped in 1950.

== Characteristics ==
Norfolk was laid down in July 1927 at Govan by Fairfield Shipbuilding & Engineering Co. Ltd, launched on 12 December 1928, and commissioned on 30 April 1930. She was at maximum 632 ft 7 in (192.81 m) long overall, and had a beam of 66 ft (20 m) and a draught of 17 ft (5.2 m). The cruiser displaced 9,925 long tons (10,084 t) at standard displacement, in compliance with the tonnage restriction of the Washington Naval Treaty, and up to 13,450 long tons (13,670 t) at full load. Norfolk was propelled by four Parsons steam turbines that drove four screw propellers. Steam was provided by eight oil-fired 3-drum water-tube boilers. The turbines were rated at 80,000 shp (60,000 kW) and produced a top speed of 32.25 knots (59.73 km/h; 37.11 mph). The ship had a capacity of 3,210 t (3,160 long tons; 3,540 short tons) of fuel oil as built, which provided a cruising radius of 12,370 nautical miles (22,910 km; 14,240 mi) at a speed of 12 knots (22 km/h; 14 mph). She had a crew of 710 officers and enlisted men.

Norfolk was armed with a main battery of eight 8 in (203 mm) guns in four twin turrets. She had a secondary battery consisting of four twin 4 in (102 mm) dual-purpose guns. The cruiser was to be equipped with multiple QF 2-pounder anti-aircraft guns, but these were not yet available when she was commissioned. In 1939 her light anti-aircraft armament consisted of two octuple 2-pounder guns and two quadruple 0.5 in (12.7 mm) Vickers AA machine guns. By 1945 this was modified to six quadruple 2-pounders, nine single Bofors 40 mm guns and eleven twin 20 mm guns. To compensate for the added weight of anti-aircraft armament and radars, the third ( "X" ) twin 8 inch turret was landed in 1944. Norfolk also mounted two quadruple 21 in (533 mm) torpedo tubes.

The County-class heavy cruisers sacrificed armour for speed and armament. As built there was no belt armour, but a 3.5 in (89 mm) belt was added before the war. The sides and the barbettes used 1 in (25 mm) plating, the lower deck 1.4–1.5 in (36–38 mm), the turrets 1.5–2 in (38–51 mm) and only the ammunition magazines received 2.5 in (64 mm) of armour plate on the sides.

During the war, Norfolk underwent five refits and repairs : April-July 1940, July-September 1941, February-March 1942, April-May 1943 and February-October 1944. On each occasion her anti-aircraft armament and radar equipment were updated with what was available at the moment.

== Service history ==
=== Inter-war period ===
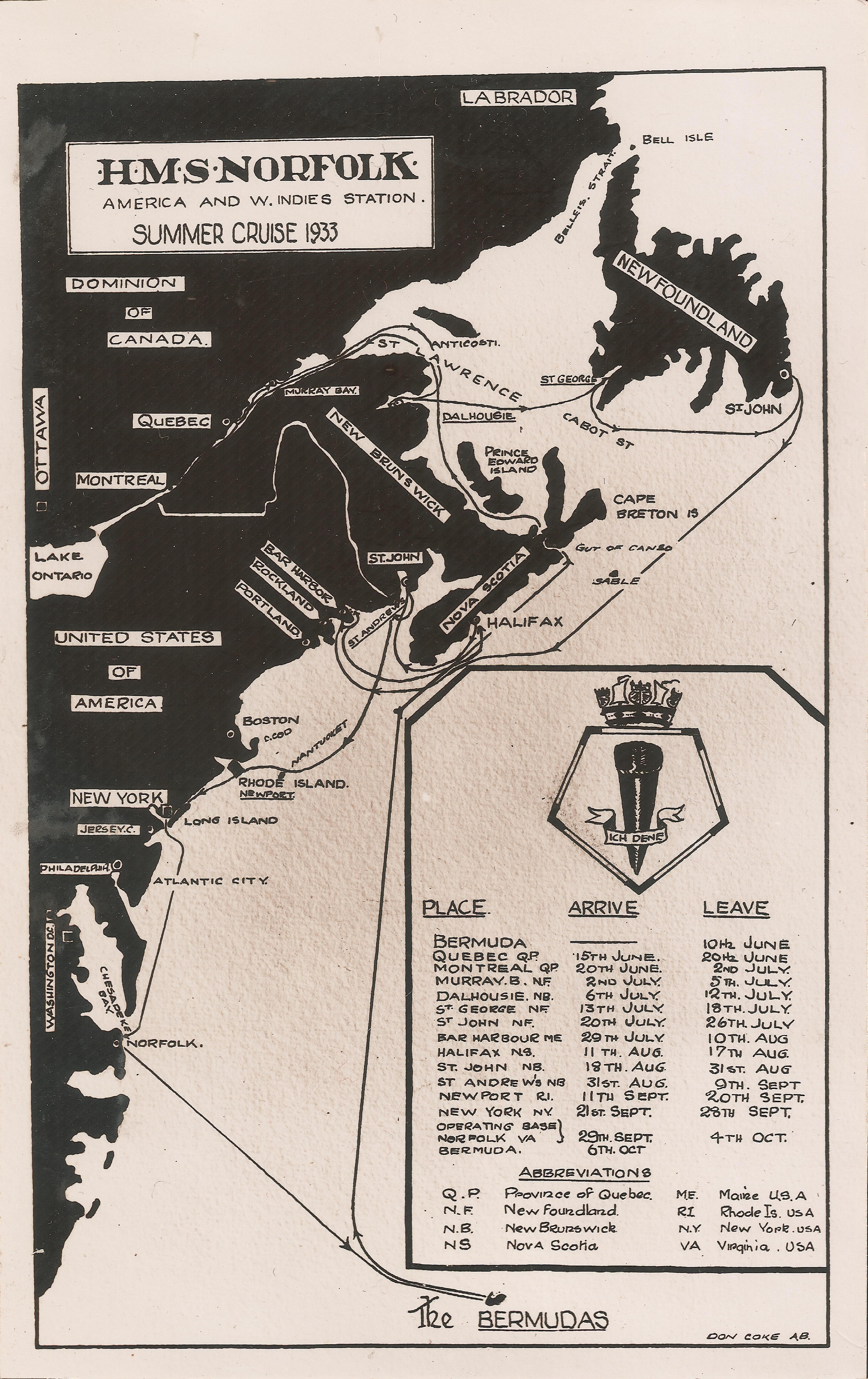
1933 HMS Norfolk Summer cruise map

In July 1931, Norfolk and Devonshire were the first British Navy ships to visit the German harbour Kiel. In September 1931, the crew of the Norfolk were part of a mutiny that later became known as the Invergordon Mutiny. The ship later served with the Home Fleet until 1932 and was then Flagship of the 8th Cruiser Squadron on the America and West Indies Station, based at the Royal Naval Dockyard on Ireland Island in the Imperial fortress colony of Bermuda, between 1932 and 1934. Norfolk left Bermuda on 21 November 1934 for England. From 1935 to 1939, Norfolk served with the Commander-in-Chief, East Indies, before coming home to refit in 1939, being still in dockyard hands when war was declared.

=== Second World War ===
At the outbreak of war in 1939, Norfolk was part of the 8th Cruiser Squadron of the Home Fleet. In November she was part of the Northern Patrol guarding Denmark Strait against German blockade runners and raiders. On 23 November the German battleships Gneisenau and Scharnhorst attacked the Northern Patrol between Iceland and the Faroe Islands and sank the armed merchant cruiser HMS Rawalpindi. Norfolk was involved in the chase for the two German battleships, but Scharnhorst and Gneisenau retreated at high speed and managed to return to Germany in bad weather. In anticipation of a British reaction on the sortie of the two battleships, the Oberkommando der Marine (OKM) had organised a submarine trap East of the Shetland isles. In very bad weather, Norfolk was sighted on 28 November by U-35 which signalled a contact report and alerted the nearby U-47 under the command of the famous Günther Prien. Due to the bad weather, Prien managed only to launch one torpedo which missed, but Prien reported one hit, while German propaganda claimed the cruiser sunk.

In order to counter a supposed Allied invasion of Norway, the Germans executed a raid on 16 March 1940 with eighteen Junkers Ju 88 of Kampfgeschwader 30 and sixteen Heinkel He 111 of Kampfgeschwader 26 at the naval base of Scapa Flow. Norfolk was struck by a 250 kg bomb from a Junkers Ju 88 at 19:59, which hit the quarterdeck near the Y turret, passed through the upper, main and lower decks, and exploded near the Y shell room, blowing a hole in the starboard side below the waterline and flooding the X and Y magazines. Four crewmen were killed and six wounded. She went into repairs for three months. After these repairs had been completed Norfolk proceeded to a shipyard on the River Tyne for a new radar set.

In November 1940, the German "pocket battleship" Admiral Scheer broke out into the Atlantic and on 5 November attacked Convoy HX 84 and sank five ships. Trying to anticipate every possible next move of the German raider, the Admiralty sent out ships to block a possible return to Germany, allocated battleships to convoy escort and organised hunting groups in the North Atlantic. Norfolk was sent out from Freetown northwards together with her sister ship Berwick and the aircraft carrier Formidable to block the raider from going to port in occupied France. When in December the Admiral Scheer appeared in the South Atlantic, Norfolk was ordered to Freetown as part of Force K on trade protection duties. On 18 January 1941 Norfolk, under the command of Captain Phillips, acting upon a report from the armed merchant cruiser Arawa seeing in the far distance the gun flashes of the German auxiliary cruiser Kormoran sinking the tanker British Union, joined in the search for the German raider together with her sister ship Devonshire.

==== Bismarck ====
On 21 May Norfolk, under the command of rear Admiral Frederic Wake-Walker, was patrolling in the Denmark Strait against possible German raiders. When the British received news of an impeding attempt of the German battleship Bismarck and heavy cruiser Prinz Eugen to break-out into the Atlantic, the Denmark Strait patrol was reinforced with Norfolk's sister ship Suffolk, which was refuelling at Iceland. In the evening of 23 May the two cruisers were patrolling 15 nautical miles (28 km; 17 mi) apart when Suffolk spotted the two German ships. Suffolk hid in the mist but when Norfolk made contact with the German ships she was spotted by Bismarck and the German battleship fired five salvoes at Norfolk before she too could escape in the mist. Norfolk and Suffolk continued to shadow Bismarck and Prinz Eugen with their radar and sent regular contact reports, in order to guide a British force consisting of the battleship Prince of Wales, the battlecruiser Hood and six destroyers under the command of Admiral Lancelot Holland to the scene. At midnight Bismarck suddenly reversed course and tried to chase the cruisers away. Norfolk and Suffolk lost contact and as a result, Holland sent his destroyers away on a fruitless search for the German ships. When contact was finally regained Holland could close in on the German ships but now the British ships were approaching slowly on a converging course rather than the planned advantageous head-on approach. In the ensuing Battle of the Denmark Strait Hood was sunk and both Bismarck and Prince Of Wales were damaged. Holland had not tried to involve the shadowing cruisers in his battle plan, the cruisers were too far away to close in before the battle was over. Only Suffolk fired a few salvoes which fell far too short.

The Bismarck Operation

Both cruisers and the damaged Prince of Wales continued to shadow the German ships in order to guide the Home Fleet to them. During the afternoon of 24 May, Bismarck turned twice on her pursuers and had a brief gun duel, first with Suffolk, and then Prince of Wales. With these diversions, Prinz Eugen was able to slip away to continue merchant raiding independently while the damaged Bismarck wanted to head to the French port of Brest for repairs. During the night, an attack with nine Fairey Swordfish aircraft was launched from the approaching Home Fleet. (Note: At this latitude and time of the year, there was still daylight) In bad visibility the aircraft detected Bismarck at 23:30 and the shadowing British ships with their radar, and made contact with Norfolk to get a proper heading towards the enemy. The aircraft scored one hit but this did not affect Bismarck much. Norfolk was trailing Bismarck with her radar on the port side. As the British ships entered the open Atlantic, they started to zigzag because of the U-boat danger. Norfolk had a fixed radar, not a rotating one, and was able to track Bismarck only during the first leg of the zigzag. When Bismarck turned away on 25 May at 03:06 to starboard and behind the trailing ships, the manoeuvre was detected too late and the British ships lost contact. Norfolk, Suffolk, Prince of Wales, and the approaching Home Fleet fanned out to regain contact but Bismarck had escaped.

During the subsequent search for Bismarck, many British ships had to give up the hunt because of fuel shortage and because they were searching in the wrong direction, thinking Bismarck would either continue into the Atlantic or return to Norway. Wake-Walker anticipated Bismarck continuing to a French port and when Bismarck was found back on 26 May at 10:30 by air reconnaissance on her way to Brest, Norfolk was in a position to pick up the chase again. Bismarck had its rudder jammed as a result of a torpedo aircraft attack the same day at 20:47 by the aircraft carrier Ark Royal from Force H. During the night Norfolk closed in together with the battleships Rodney and King George V, but waited until the morning of 27 May to attack, while Bismarck was constantly being harassed by individual torpedo attacks of five destroyers under the command of Captain Philip Vian. Norfolk made contact with Bismarck at 07:53 but withdrew quickly awaiting the arrival of Rodney and King George V. The British initiated the battle at 08:47 and Norfolk joined at 08:54, firing from 22,000 yards (20,000 m). At 08:59 she scored an important hit on the foretop of Bismarck, putting her central fire control station out of action. At 09:10 Norfolk fired four torpedoes from 16,000 yd (15,000 m) which all missed. During the battle she fired a total of 527 8-inch shells, and carried out flank marking for the battleships. Bismarck was put out of action by 09:30 and finally sank at 10:40. After the battle Norfolk returned independently to the Clyde on 29 May and on the way she was bombed by one German aircraft but suffered no damage.

==== Arctic convoys ====
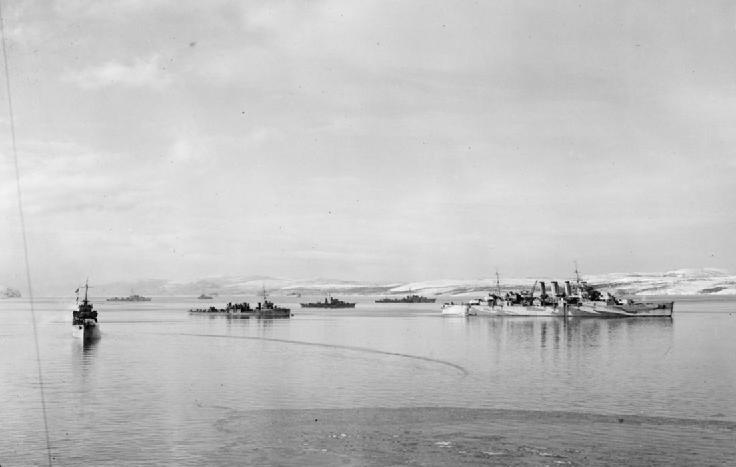
Norfolk with destroyers and merchant ships in a Russian inlet while on northern convoy duty. Photograph taken from Scylla

When the German army invaded the USSR in Operation Barbarossa in June 1941, the British decided to send aid to the Soviets. A PQ convoy lane sending military supplies from the United Kingdom to Northern Russia was established by September 1941. From October onward, Norfolk was employed as an escort for these Arctic convoys. Between 17 and 30 October she escorted the six merchant ships of Convoy PQ 2 to Arkhangelsk, in company of the destroyers Icarus and Eclipse and three minesweepers. On 3 November the cruiser and the two destroyers escorted the twelve ships of the empty return convoy QP 2 back to the United Kingdom. From then on she was attached to the Home Fleet as part of a force guarding a possible break-out attempt of the German battleship Tirpitz into the Atlantic.

In April 1942 Norfolk was assigned as close cruiser escort for the Convoy PQ 14, with the cruiser Edinburgh with the destroyers Foresight and Forester, but she was unable to link up with the other ships and did not sail to Northern Russia but instead stayed in the vicinity of Bear Island from where she could support either PQ 14 or the returning Convoy QP 10. On 13 May Norfolk sailed again towards Bear Island as part of a cruiser force in order to cover the return of the damaged cruiser Trinidad from Murmansk to home waters, but Trinidad was sunk by German bomber aircraft before they could reach her. Between 21 and 29 May she sailed to Kola Bay as part of the close cruiser escort for Convoy PQ 16 and the returning QP 12. By now, the Germans were opposing the passage of these convoys fiercely, but due to fuel shortages for their surface fleet, attacked mainly with aircraft and U-boats, so Norfolk was not much involved in the defence of the convoy.

The next Convoy PQ 17 sailed on 27 June and again Norfolk was part of the close cruiser escort. Through intelligence the British learned that the German surface fleet had plans to intercept the convoy and the First Sea Lord Dudley Pound decided to recall all escorts and to scatter the convoy, resulting in the loss of twenty-three out of thirty-five ships of the convoy. Due to the heavy losses and opposition, the next Convoy PQ 18 was delayed until 7 September, when the threat of interception by Tirpitz had receded. The cruiser escort with Norfolk did not stay close to the convoy but patrolled in the area northwest of Jan Mayen and covered the returning Convoy QP 14 as well.

Arctic convoys were then suspended to free forces for Operation Torch, the Allied landings in North Africa in November. Norfolk and her sister ship Cumberland operated during Operation Torch as a covering force near the Azores for the American landings on the Atlantic coast of Morocco by the Western Task Force.

In December 1942, the Arctic convoys were resumed. Pound insisted that these convoys were given protection against an attack by the German surface fleet stationed in Norway, by giving them cover of a cruiser force all the way to North Russia. The Home Fleet usually sailed as well but kept its distance. Norfolk was now usually attached to the Home Fleet or was on patrol around Iceland. Only after the cruiser Sheffield received severe storm damage did Norfolk replace her in the cruiser force for Convoy JW 53 in March 1943.

==== Battle of North Cape ====
In November 1943 the Arctic convoys were resumed again. The first pair of convoys Convoy JW 54A and Convoy JW 54B sailed unopposed, with Norfolk being part of the cruiser covering force, but on 19 December, Großadmiral Karl Dönitz told Hitler that the Kriegsmarine would attack and destroy the next convoy. Anticipating an attack by Scharnhorst, the commander of the Home Fleet Bruce Fraser organised a trap : for the next convoys Convoy JW 55A and Convoy JW 55B, the cruiser escort consisting of the 10th Cruiser Squadron with the cruisers Sheffield, Belfast and Norfolk would keep Scharnhorst at bay and shadow her so that he could stay undetected at distance with the battleship Duke of York and race to the scene when needed. On 26 December at 09:21 Sheffield sighted Scharnhorst, and Norfolk opened fire at 09:30. Norfolk fired six salvoes and scored two hits on Scharnhorst in a brief gun duel, disabling the aft radar of the German ship. Scharnhorst withdrew and escaped at high speed.

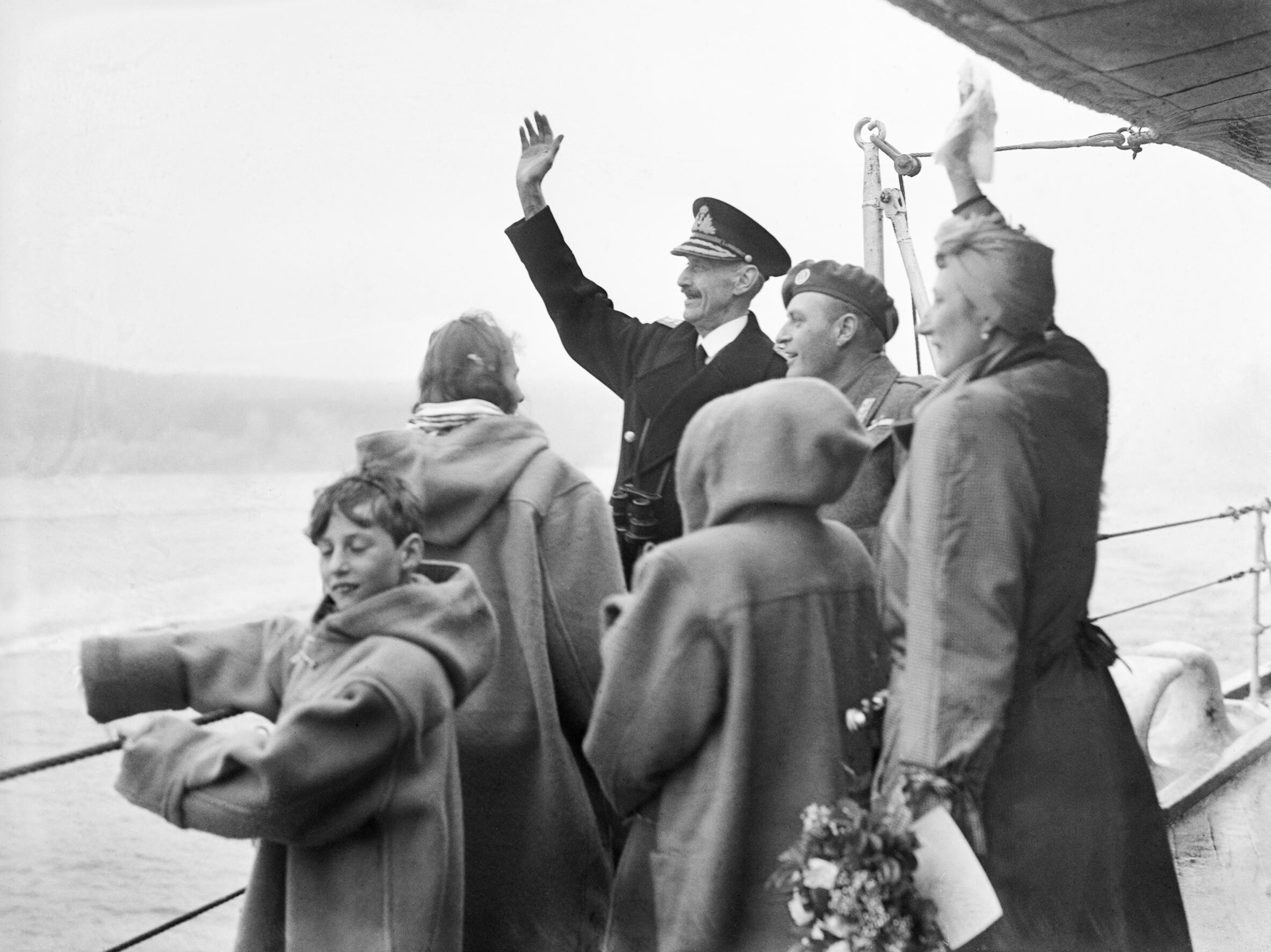
The royal family of Norway waving to the welcoming crowds from Norfolk at Oslo

The cruisers were not able to follow but positioned themselves correctly on the other side of the convoy where Scharnhorst tried a second attack three hours later. At 12:10 Sheffield's radar detected Scharnhorst at a distance of 12 miles (19 km) and a second engagement developed. Sheffield was straddled by several salvoes but then Scharnhorst changed target and hit Norfolk two times. The first hit put 'X' turret out of action, the second exploded midships below maindeck and killed six men. Fearing torpedo attacks, Scharnhorst broke off the action and turned for port in Norway. The cruisers kept shadowing but first Norfolk and then Sheffield dropped behind with engine trouble. Belfast remained in touch with Scharnhorst and guided Duke of York to the scene. Duke of York opened fire at 16:51, by 17:00 Norfolk had linked up and opened fire as well. By 19:45 the German battleship was sunk by gunfire from Duke of York and torpedoes from the escorting destroyers.

After the battle of North Cape, Norfolk underwent a lengthy refit. (Note: Rohwer 2005 mentions Norfolk as part of the cruiser covering force for convoys JW 56A and JW 57 but that must be in error) On 11 January 1945 a British force consisting of the cruisers Norfolk and Bellona and four destroyers, executed a raid on Norwegian coastal shipping. Near Egersund they attacked a German convoy and sank two freighters and the escorting minesweeper M 273. Fighters from the covering escort carriers Trumpeter and Premier repulsed a German counter-attack by torpedo aircraft. Norfolk was the flagship of Vice Admiral Rhoderick McGrigor off North Norway during Operation Judgement, an attack by the Fleet Air Arm on a U-boat base which destroyed two ships and U-711 on 4 May 1945, in the last air raid of the war in Europe.

=== Post-war ===
Norfolk left Plymouth for a much needed refit at Malta, after transporting on 7 June the Norwegian Royal family back to Oslo after their five-year exile in London. After the war the large County-class cruisers with their large crews were too demanding on the manpower of the Navy. Only the cruisers that had been extensively modernised during war such as Norfolk were retained in a training or staff role. Between August 1945 and March 1946 she was part of the 5th Cruiser Squadron in the East Indies Station. In January 1946 Norfolk became the flagship stationed at Batavia. In 1949, Norfolk returned to Britain and was placed in reserve. She was sold to BISCO for scrapping on 3 January 1950. On 14 February 1950, she proceeded to Newport, arriving on 19 February, to be scrapped.
