= HMS Beagle (H30) =

Royal Navy B-class destroyer (1930–1945)

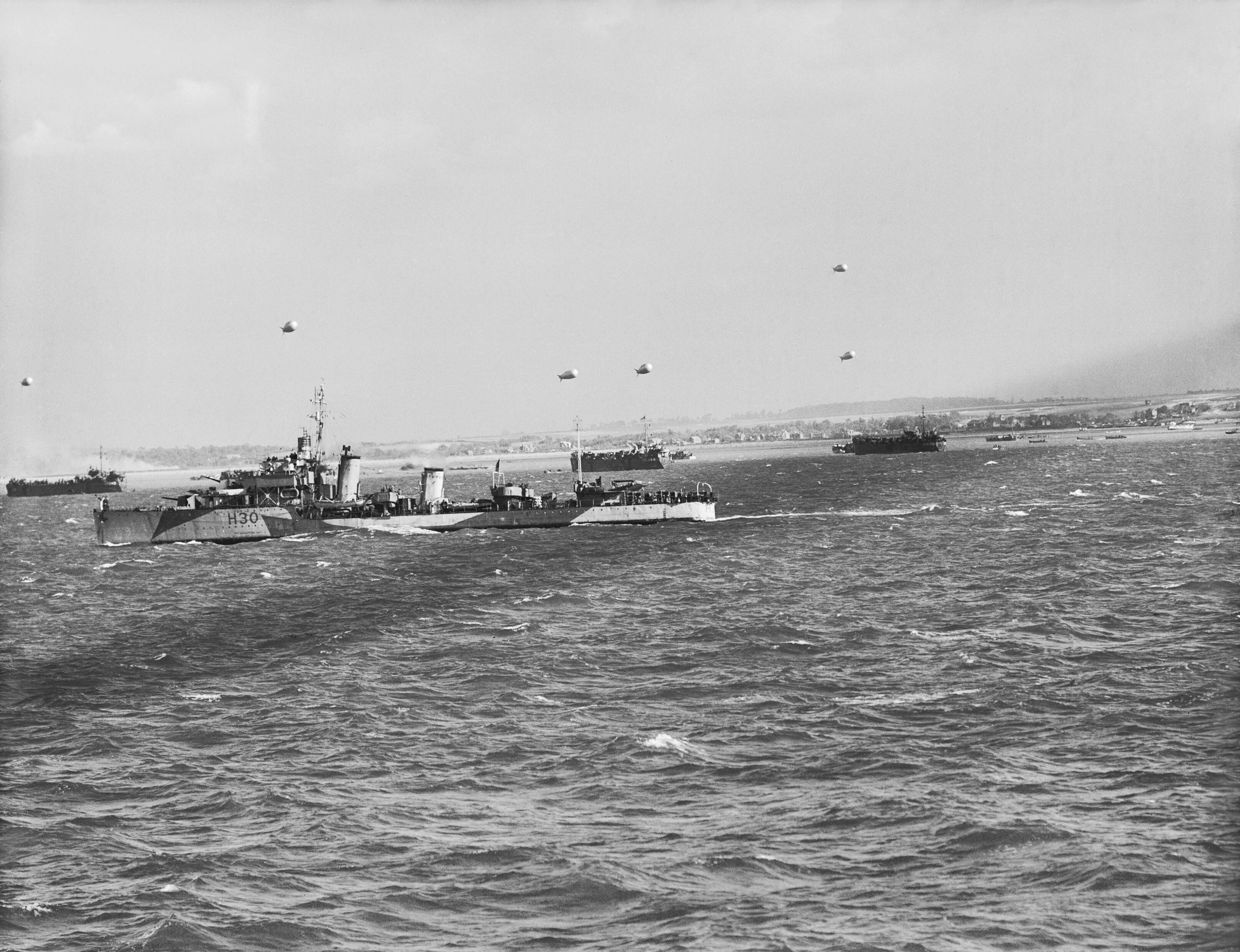
- Beagle off Gold Beach during the Normandy Landings, 6 June 1944

History

United Kingdom
- Name: Beagle
- Namesake: Beagle
- Ordered: 4 March 1929
- Builder: John Brown & Company
- Laid down: 11 October 1929
- Launched: 26 September 1930
- Completed: 9 April 1931
- Decommissioned: 24 May 1945
- Identification: Pennant number: H30
- Fate: Sold for scrap, 15 January 1946

General characteristics (as built)
- Class & type: B-class destroyer
- Displacement: 1,360 long tons (1,380 t) (standard)
- Length: 323 ft (98.5 m) (o/a)
- Beam: 32 ft 3 in (9.8 m)
- Draught: 12 ft 3 in (3.7 m)
- Installed power: 3 × Admiralty 3-drum boilers; 34,000 shp (25,000 kW)
- Propulsion: 2 × shafts; 2 × geared steam turbines
- Speed: 35 knots (65 km/h; 40 mph)
- Range: 4,800 nmi (8,900 km; 5,500 mi) at 15 knots (28 km/h; 17 mph)
- Complement: 142 (wartime)
- Sensors & processing systems: Type 119 ASDIC
- Armament: 4 × single 4.7 in (120 mm) guns; 2 × single 2 pdr (40 mm (1.6 in)) AA guns; 2 × quadruple 21 in (533 mm) torpedo tubes; 1 × depth charge rail and 2 throwers; 20 × depth charges

HMS Beagle was a B-class destroyer built for the Royal Navy (RN) around 1930. Initially assigned to the Mediterranean Fleet, she was transferred to the Home Fleet in 1936. She spent most of World War II on escort duty, taking part in the Norwegian Campaign, the Battle of the Atlantic, Operation Torch, the Russian Convoys, and in the Normandy landings before accepting the surrender of the German garrison of the Channel Islands the day after the formal German surrender on 9 May together with another ship.

One exception to this pattern was when she helped to evacuate British soldiers and civilians in the Battle of France in 1940. During the war Beagle assisted in sinking one German submarine and claimed to have shot down two German aircraft. Redundant after the war, she was broken up for scrap in 1946.

== Description ==
Beagle displaced 1,360 long tons (1,380 t) at standard load and 1,790 long tons (1,820 t) at deep load. The ship had an overall length of 323 feet (98.5 m), a beam of 32 feet 3 inches (9.8 m) and a draught of 12 feet 3 inches (3.7 m). She was powered by Brown-Curtis geared steam turbines, driving two shafts, which developed a total of 34,000 shaft horsepower (25,000 kW) and gave a maximum speed of 35 knots (65 km/h; 40 mph). Steam for the turbines was provided by three Admiralty 3-drum boilers. Beagle carried a maximum of 390 long tons (400 t) of fuel oil that gave her a range of 4,800 nautical miles (8,900 km; 5,500 mi) at 15 knots (28 km/h; 17 mph). The ship's complement was 134 officers and ratings, although it increased to 142 in wartime.

The ship mounted four 45-calibre quick-firing (QF) 4.7-inch Mk IX guns in single mounts, 'A', 'B', 'X', and 'Y' turrets from front to rear. For anti-aircraft (AA) defence, Beagle had two 40-millimetre (1.6 in) QF 2-pounder Mk II AA guns mounted on a platform between her funnels. She was fitted with two above-water quadruple torpedo tube mounts for 21-inch (533 mm) torpedoes. One depth charge rail and two throwers were fitted; 20 depth charges were originally carried but this increased to 35 shortly after the war began. The ship was fitted with a Type 119 ASDIC set to detect submarines by reflections from sound waves transmitted into the water.

By October 1940 the ship's anti-aircraft armament was increased when the rear set of torpedo tubes was replaced by a 3-inch (76.2 mm) (12-pounder) AA gun and 'Y' gun was removed to compensate for the additional depth charges added. Around December 1941, the ship was converted to an escort destroyer with the replacement of her 'A' gun by a Hedgehog anti-submarine spigot mortar and more depth charge stowage replaced the 12-pounder high-angle gun. The 2-pounder mounts were replaced by 20-millimetre (0.8 in) Oerlikon cannon and two more Oerlikons were also added in the forward superstructure. Sometime before June 1944, 'A' gun was reinstalled and the Hedgehog was replaced by a split system, with launchers on each side of the gun. To combat German E-boats, a QF 6-pounder gun was mounted at the tip of the bow.

== Construction and service ==
The ship was ordered on 4 March 1929 from John Brown & Company at Clydebank, Glasgow, under the 1928 Naval Programme. She was laid down on 11 October 1929, and launched on 26 September 1930, as the seventh RN ship to carry this name. Beagle was completed on 9 April 1931 at a cost of £220,342, excluding items supplied by the Admiralty such as guns, ammunition and communications equipment.

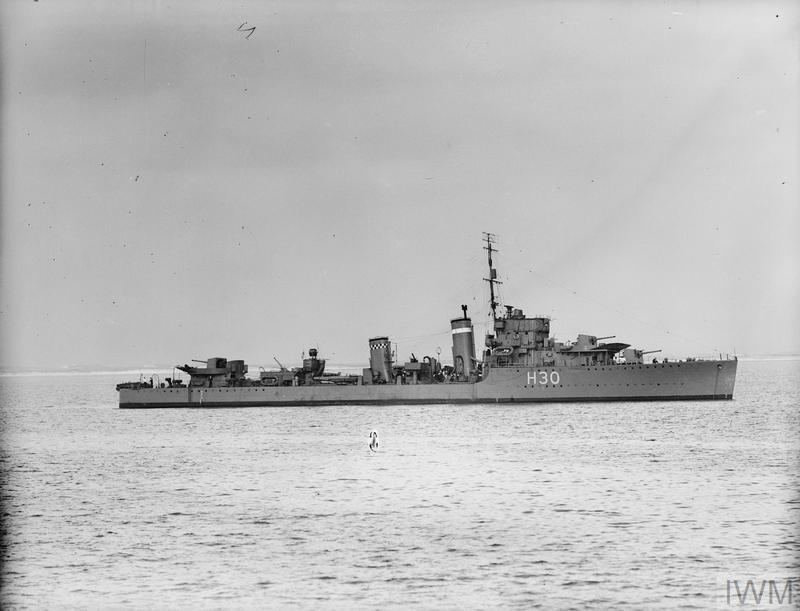
Beagle, July 1941

After her commissioning, she was assigned to the 4th Destroyer Flotilla with the Mediterranean Fleet until 1936. Shortly before returning home, Beagle was deployed to Jaffa in the Arab Revolt to support British forces there. The flotilla was reassigned to the Home Fleet in September 1936 and the ship began a refit at Devonport after arriving on 27 August that lasted until 16 January 1937. She was refitted again from 4 April to 17 September 1938 before being assigned as the plane guard for the aircraft carrier Furious.

This assignment lasted only two months before she was refitted yet again from 24 November to 3 January 1939. Beagle then became the plane guard for the carrier Argus during which she collided with her sister ship Basilisk and required a month's worth of repairs in April–May. Following their completion on 3 May, the ship was reassigned to Furious before she was docked again before the start of World War II on 3 September.

Commanded by Lt. Royston Hollis Wright, Beagle was transferred to the 19th Destroyer Flotilla at the beginning of the war and spent her time until April 1940 escorting convoys and patrolling in the English Channel and the North Sea aside from yet another dockyard period from 18 December 1939 to 22 January 1940. In the Norwegian Campaign she escorted convoys between Orkney and Narvik, Norway. In the Battle of France, Beagle evacuated British troops and civilians from St. Nazaire and Bordeaux, France. In the former action, she rescued 600 survivors of the ocean liner Lancastria, sunk by German aircraft during the evacuation, on 17 June.

The ship was transferred to the 1st Destroyer Flotilla at Dover on 3 July until she was damaged by Junkers Ju 87 "Stuka" dive bombers on 19 July. Beagle's repairs at Devonport lasted until 16 August and the ship was transferred to the 22nd Destroyer Flotilla upon their completion where she served in the English Channel. She was transferred to Home Fleet for escort duties in October and promptly escorted Argus as she ferried aircraft to Iceland and then escorted a convoy to West Africa. On 4 November Beagle rescued 230 survivors from the sinking of the armed merchant cruiser HMS Patroclus.

With Lt.Cdr. Richard Taylor White. taking command in February 1941 Beagle was assigned to Western Approaches Command and its 4th Escort Group for convoy escort duties between the Clyde and Iceland. While under repair for weather damage that broke her foremast in October, a Type 271 target indication radar was installed above the bridge that replaced her director-control tower and rangefinder. After the ship was more extensively damaged by weather two months later, Beagle was converted into an escort destroyer, a process that lasted until April 1942. At some point later in the war, a Type 286 short-range surface search radar was fitted.

Now commanded by Cdr. Ralph Cyril Medley, Beagle was assigned as an escort for Convoy PQ 14 to the Soviet port of Murmansk in April and escorted Convoy QP 11 on the return trip. The convoy was attacked by three German destroyers on 1 May, but the four escorting destroyers drove off the German ships despite being seriously outgunned. Beagle was lightly damaged by splinters in the engagement. Upon her return, the ship was assigned to the Greenock Escort Force and escorted convoys between the Clyde and Iceland until October when she was transferred to Force H. She participated in Operation Torch in November, before returning to escort Convoys JW 51A, RA 51, and JW 52 to and from Russia beginning in December.

After a refit to improve her radar, anti-submarine equipment, and Arctic habitability, Beagle was ordered to Freetown, Sierra Leone in early 1943 where she served as a local escort until November. With Lt. Cdr. Norman Robins Murch now in command, that month she returned to the Home Fleet and escorted convoys to and from Russia through May 1944 with the 8th Escort Group. Whilst escorting Convoy JW58, the ship assisted in sinking the German submarine U-355 on 1 April in conjunction with aircraft from the escort carrier Tracker. Beagle was then assigned to escort and support the forces participating in Operation Overlord. On 8 June the destroyer rescued 250 survivors from two United States Navy (USN) tank landing ships that were sunk 18 miles (29 km) northeast of Barfleur during passage of Convoy ECM1P after an E-boat attack. The ship also claimed to have shot down two Junkers Ju 88 medium bombers in June. She began a refit on 19 July at Sheerness Dockyard that lasted until September and, commanded by Lt. Charles Douglas Theodore Williams rejoined the 8th Escort Group. More extensive repairs were required between December 1944 and February 1945. Beagle was briefly reassigned to the 8th Escort Group before she was transferred to Plymouth Command on 11 March for escort duties. The ship was tasked to blockade the German-occupied ports in France from 12 April.

The ship arrived in the Channel Islands and landed at St Helier on Jersey on 9 May 1945 and accepted the German forces' unconditional surrender. Two members of the crew were met by the harbourmaster, who escorted them to his office where they together hoisted the Union Flag, before also raising it on the flagstaff of the Pomme D'Or Hotel. Her sister Bulldog arrived at St Peter Port in Guernsey on the same date to accept the German surrender on that island.

Beagle was placed in reserve 15 days later and was approved for scrapping on 22 December. She was turned over for scrapping on 15 January 1946 at Rosyth and moved to the shipbreaking yard of Metal Industries, Limited two days later.
