= German submarine U-601 =

German World War II submarine

History

Nazi Germany
- Name: U-601
- Ordered: 22 May 1940
- Builder: Blohm & Voss, Hamburg
- Yard number: 577
- Laid down: 10 February 1941
- Launched: 29 October 1941
- Commissioned: 18 December 1941
- Fate: Sunk by depth charges on 25 February 1944

General characteristics
- Class & type: Type VIIC submarine
- Displacement: 769 tonnes (757 long tons) surfaced; 871 t (857 long tons) submerged
- Length: 67.10 m (220 ft 2 in) o/a; 50.50 m (165 ft 8 in) pressure hull
- Beam: 6.20 m (20 ft 4 in) o/a; 4.70 m (15 ft 5 in) pressure hull
- Draught: 4.74 m (15 ft 7 in)
- Installed power: 2,800–3,200 PS (2,100–2,400 kW; 2,800–3,200 bhp) (diesels); 750 PS (550 kW; 740 shp) (electric)
- Propulsion: 2 shafts; 2 × diesel engines; 2 × electric motors
- Speed: 17.7 knots (32.8 km/h; 20.4 mph) surfaced; 7.6 knots (14.1 km/h; 8.7 mph) submerged
- Range: 8,500 nmi (15,700 km; 9,800 mi) at 10 knots (19 km/h; 12 mph) surfaced; 80 nmi (150 km; 92 mi) at 4 knots (7.4 km/h; 4.6 mph) submerged
- Test depth: 230 m (750 ft); Crush depth: 250–295 m (820–968 ft)
- Complement: 4 officers, 40–56 enlisted
- Armament: 5 × 53.3 cm (21 in) torpedo tubes (four bow, one stern); 14 × torpedoes or 26 TMA mines; 1 × 8.8 cm (3.46 in) deck gun (220 rounds); 1 x 2 cm (0.79 in) C/30 AA gun

Service record
- Part of: 5th U-boat Flotilla; 18 December 1941 – 30 June 1942; 11th U-boat Flotilla; 1 July 1942 – 31 May 1943; 13th U-boat Flotilla; 1 June 1943 – 25 February 1944
- Identification codes: M 47 254
- Commanders: Kptlt. Peter-Ottmar Grau; 18 December 1941 – 28 November 1943; Oblt.z.S. Otto Hansen; 29 November 1943 – 25 February 1944
- Operations: 10 patrols: 1st patrol: 14 July – 3 August 1942; 2nd patrol: a. 9 August – 20 September 1942; b. 22 – 24 September 1942; c. 31 October – 3 November 1942; 3rd patrol: a. 5 November – 7 December 1942; b. 8 December 1942; c. 15 – 24 December 1942; d. 3 – 5 April 1943; e. 6 – 7 April 1943; 4th patrol: a. 15 April – 14 May 1943; b. 15 May 1943; c. 7 – 10 July 1943; 5th patrol: a. 14 – 25 July 1943; b. 26 – 27 July 1943; c. 29 July 1943; 6th patrol: a. 30 July – 28 August 1943; b. 13 – 14 September 1943; c. 15 – 16 September 1943; 7th patrol: a. 16 September – 7 October 1943; b. 8 October 1943; c. 9 October 1943; d. 10 October 1943; e. 12 – 14 October 1943; f. 17 – 19 October 1943; g. 10 – 12 December 1943; 8th patrol: 18 December 1943 – 7 January 1944; 9th patrol: a. 10 January – 2 February 1944; b. 4 – 5 February 1944; 10th patrol: 17 – 25 February 1944
- Victories: 4 merchant ships sunk (8,869 GRT)

German submarine U-601 was a Type VIIC U-boat built for Nazi Germany's Kriegsmarine for service in World War II. She was commissioned on 18 December 1941 and sunk on 25 February 1944, having sunk four ships. Her commanders were Peter-Ottmar Grau and Otto Hansen.

== Design ==
German Type VIIC submarines were preceded by the shorter Type VIIB submarines. U-601 had a displacement of 769 tonnes (757 long tons) when at the surface and 871 tonnes (857 long tons) while submerged. She had a total length of 67.10 m (220 ft 2 in), a pressure hull length of 50.50 m (165 ft 8 in), a beam of 6.20 m (20 ft 4 in), a height of 9.60 m (31 ft 6 in), and a draught of 4.74 m (15 ft 7 in). The submarine was powered by two Germaniawerft F46 four-stroke, six-cylinder supercharged diesel engines producing a total of 2,800 to 3,200 metric horsepower (2,060 to 2,350 kW; 2,760 to 3,160 shp) for use while surfaced, two Brown, Boveri & Cie GG UB 720/8 double-acting electric motors producing a total of 750 metric horsepower (550 kW; 740 shp) for use while submerged. She had two shafts and two 1.23 m (4 ft) propellers. The boat was capable of operating at depths of up to 230 metres (750 ft).

The submarine had a maximum surface speed of 17.7 knots (32.8 km/h; 20.4 mph) and a maximum submerged speed of 7.6 knots (14.1 km/h; 8.7 mph). When submerged, the boat could operate for 80 nautical miles (150 km; 92 mi) at 4 knots (7.4 km/h; 4.6 mph); when surfaced, she could travel 8,500 nautical miles (15,700 km; 9,800 mi) at 10 knots (19 km/h; 12 mph). U-601 was fitted with five 53.3 cm (21 in) torpedo tubes (four fitted at the bow and one at the stern), fourteen torpedoes, one 8.8 cm (3.46 in) SK C/35 naval gun, 220 rounds and a 2 cm (0.79 in) C/30 anti-aircraft gun. The boat had a complement of between forty-four and sixty.

== Service history ==
U-601 was built by Blohm & Voss, Hamburg as yard number 577. She was ordered on 22 May 1940 and the keel was laid down on 10 February 1941. U-601 was launched on 29 October 1941.

She took part in ten patrols; exclusively in the Arctic Ocean. She was assigned to:

- 5th U-boat Flotilla (18 December 1941 – 30 June 1942)
- 11th U-boat Flotilla (1 July 1942 – 31 May 1943)
- 13th U-boat Flotilla (1 June 1943 – 25 February 1944)

On 23 November 1942, she along with U-625 as part of wolfpack Boreas, attacked Convoy QP 15 and sank the Soviet cargo ship Kuznets Lesov.

== Fate ==
She was sunk by depth charges in the Arctic Ocean on 25 February 1944 North west of Narvik, Norway by a RAF Catalina at position 70°26′N 12°40′E. She was lost with all 51 hands.

== Wolfpacks ==
U-601 took part in five wolfpacks, namely:

- Boreas (19 November – 6 December 1942)
- Wiking (20 September – 3 October 1943)
- Eisenbart (19 December 1943 – 5 January 1944)
- Isegrim (16 – 27 January 1944)
- Werwolf (27 January – 1 February 1944)

== Summary of raiding history ==
Date	Ship Name	Nationality	Tonnage (GRT)	Fate
1 August 1942	Krest’janin	Soviet Union	2,513	Sunk
24 August 1942	Kujbyshev	Soviet Union	2,332	Sunk
24 August 1942	Medvezhonok	Soviet Union	50	Sunk
23 November 1942	Kuznets Lesov	Soviet Union	3,974	Sunk

== Bibliography ==
- Gröner, Eric; Jung, Dieter; Maass, Martin (1991). German Warships 1815-1945: U-boats and Mine Warfare Vessels. Vol. 2. Translated by Thomas, Keith; Magowan, Rachel. London: Conway Maritime Press. ISBN 0-85177-593-4.
