= Olaf M. Hustvedt =

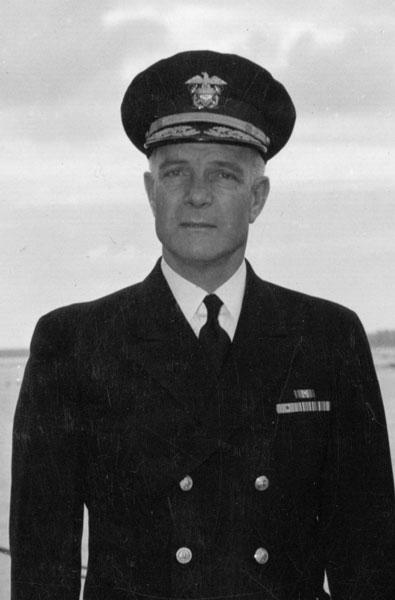
- Born: 23 June 1886; Chicago, Illinois, U.S.
- Died: 22 December 1978 (aged 92); Washington, D.C., U.S.
- Burial place: Arlington National Cemetery, Arlington, Virginia
- Relatives: Frederick Hauck (grandson)
- Military career
- Allegiance: United States
- Branch: United States Navy
- Service years: 1909–1946
- Rank: Vice Admiral
- Commands: USS Burns (DM-11); USS Detroit (CL-8); USS North Carolina (BB-55); Battleship Division 7
- Conflicts: World War I World War II: Battle of the Atlantic; Operation Leader; Pacific War; Operation Flintlock; Operation Hailstone; Battle of the Philippine Sea
- Awards: Legion of Merit (two awards); Mexican Service Medal; World War I Victory Medal; American Defense Service Medal (two awards); American Campaign Medal; European–African–Middle Eastern Campaign Medal (two awards); Asiatic–Pacific Campaign Medal (five awards); World War II Victory Medal; Order of the British Empire

Vice Admiral Olaf Mandt Hustvedt OBE (23 June 1886 – 22 December 1978) was a senior officer of the United States Navy. He saw service in World War I and World War II, operating in both the Battle of the Atlantic and the Pacific War. During his 36-year career, he distinguished himself as an expert in naval ordnance and as a battleship commander.

== Naval career ==
Hustvedt was born in Chicago, Illinois, on 23 June 1886 to Norwegian immigrant parents. He graduated from the United States Naval Academy in 1909. Among his classmates were Alan G. Kirk, Jesse B. Oldendorf, and Theodore S. Wilkinson. His first tour of duty was aboard the armored cruiser USS West Virginia, in which he cruised from the United States West Coast to many ports in East Asia. He then attended George Washington University in Washington, D.C., from which he received a Master of Science degree in 1914.

In 1914, Hustvedt reported for duty aboard the battleship USS Utah. In 1916, he became a member of the staff of Commander, Battleship Division 6.

=== World War I ===
During World War I, Hustvedt served aboard the battleship USS New York before transferring in 1918 to the battleship USS Oklahoma as Oklahoma's gunnery officer. Both battleships saw service in European waters during the war, with New York operating with other American battleships of Battleship Division 9 as the 6th Battle Squadron of the Royal Navy's Grand Fleet and with Oklahoma seeing service escorting Allied convoys.

=== Interwar ===
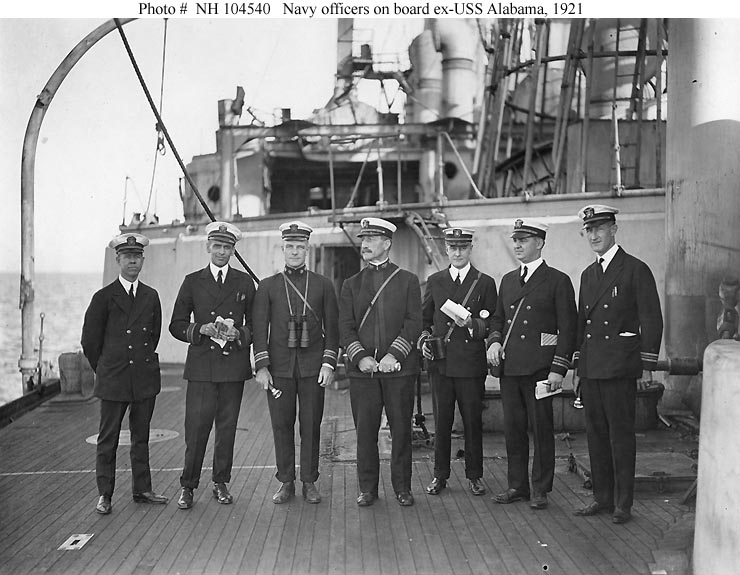
Hustvedt (third from left) as a lieutenant commander with other officers aboard the decommissioned battleship USS Alabama (BB-8) in September 1921 just before Alabama was expended in aerial bombing trials.

In 1919, Hustvedt became Chief of the Experimental Division at the U.S. Navy's Bureau of Ordnance in Washington, D.C. During his tour, he was among the U.S. Navy observers of United States Army Air Service Brigadier General Billy Mitchell's bombing demonstrations against decommissioned American battleships in the Chesapeake Bay in September 1921. He also played a role in giving rocket pioneer Dr. Robert Goddard his first U.S. government contract and approved a contract for Carl Norden to work on the famous Norden bombsight for the Navy.

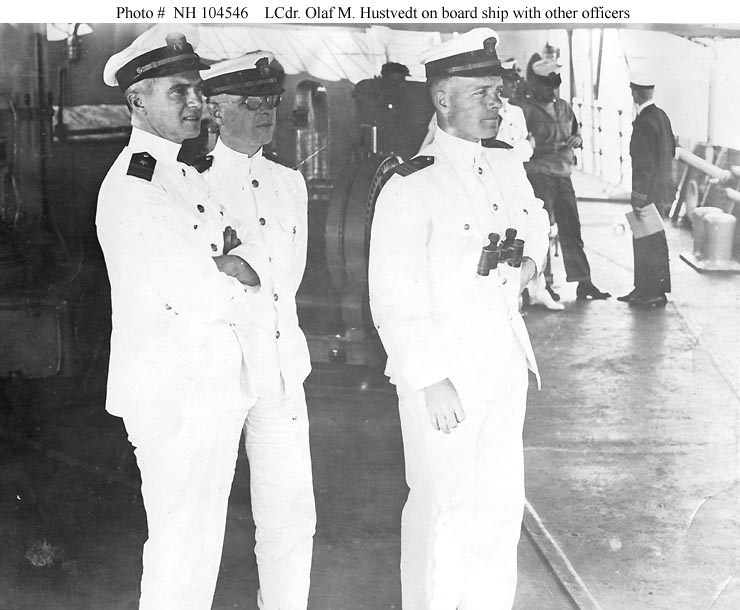
Husvtedt (right) as a lieutenant commander aboard ship with two other officers, ca. 1921-1924.

Hustvedt was promoted to lieutenant commander in 1921, when he became commanding officer of the light minelayer USS Burns (DM-11). In 1924 he returned to the Bureau of Ordnance. He was assigned to the battleship USS Colorado (BB-45) in 1927, then transferred in 1928 to the battleship USS California (BB-44) as the gunnery officer of a battleship division of the Battle Fleet. He moved on in 1930 to duty at the Naval Gun Factory at the Washington Navy Yard in Washington, D.C.

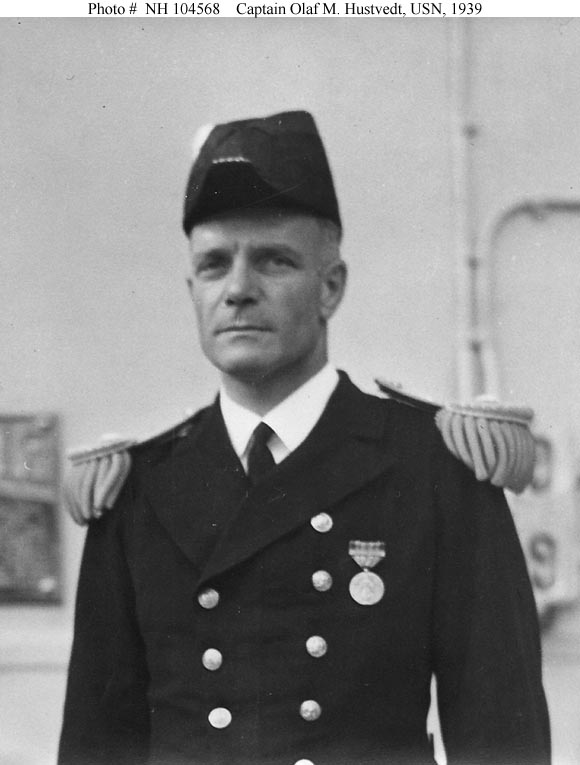
Hustvedt as a captain in full dress uniform in 1939.

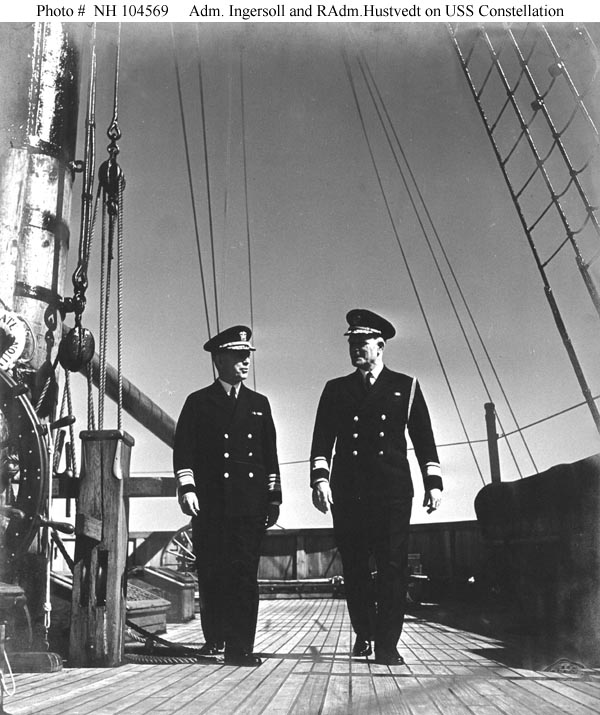
Hustvedt (right) with Admiral Royal E. Ingersoll (left) aboard USS Constellation (IX-20) at Newport, Rhode Island, while serving as Ingersoll's chief of staff in February 1942.

In 1933, Hustvedt was promoted to commander and became executive officer of the heavy cruiser USS Louisville (CA-28), then moved to the staff of the Chief of Naval Operations in Washington, D.C., in 1935. In 1938 he was promoted to captain and took command of the light cruiser USS Detroit (CL-8). In 1939 he joined the staff of the Commander, Battle Force, United States Fleet, Admiral James O. Richardson, serving aboard Richardson's flagship, the battleship USS Pennsylvania (BB-38), as Richardson's operations officer before reporting to the New York Navy Yard in Brooklyn, New York, to oversee the fitting out of the new battleship USS North Carolina (BB-55). He became North Carolina's first commanding officer upon her commissioning on 9 April 1941. On 23 October 1941, Hustvedt became chief of staff for the Commander-in-Chief, United States Atlantic Fleet, Admiral Ernest J. King.

At some point during the interwar period, Hustvedt attended the Naval War College.

=== World War II ===
==== Atlantic Theater ====
After the United States entered World War II on 8 December 1941, Hustvedt remained King's chief of staff until King became Commander-in-Chief, United States Fleet, on 30 December 1941, then continued his duties as chief of staff for the Atlantic Fleet when Vice Admiral Royal E. Ingersoll became the Fleet's commander-in-chief on 1 January 1942. Hustvedt remained Ingersoll's chief of staff until 8 May 1943, when he was promoted to rear admiral and became Commander, Battleships, Atlantic Fleet. In his new assignment, Hustvedt, with the heavy cruiser USS Tuscaloosa (CA-37) as his flagship, also commanded a U.S. Navy task force centered around the battleships USS Alabama (BB-60) and USS South Dakota (BB-57) which operated with the Royal Navy's Home Fleet from the Home Fleet's base at Scapa Flow in the Orkney Islands, cruising along the coast of Norway in the hope of luring the German battleship Tirpitz out into a battle from her base in a Norwegian fjord. Tirpitz did not come out, and the American battleships departed in August 1943 for the Pacific Theater for operations against the Japanese.

Hustvedt remained with the U.S. Navy forces at Scapa Flow. In October 1943 in Operation Leader, an Allied task force under the command of British Admiral Bruce Fraser made up of the British battleships HMS Duke of York and HMS Anson, three British cruisers, six British destroyers, and Hustvedt's U.S. Navy force consisting of the aircraft carrier USS Ranger (CV-4), Tuscaloosa, and a destroyer division, approached the coast of Norway with a goal of conducting air raids against German shipping at the port of Bodø. Ranger's aircraft made two attacks on 4 October 1943, the first one damaging two German ships in a convoy in the North Sea before continuing to Bodø and sinking two small German merchant ships there in exchange for the loss of two aircraft, while the second strike sank a large merchant ship and a small coastal merchantman at Bodø and forced another large cargo ship to beach herself with heavy damage, losing three planes in the process. When three German aircraft later approached the Allied task force in the North Sea, Ranger's combat air patrol immediately shot two of them down. Hustvedt commented that Operation Leader had demonstrated that Royal Navy and U.S. Navy ships and aircraft could operate together with "effectiveness, mutual understanding, and complete cooperation."

==== Pacific Theater ====
Hustvedt soon transferred to the Pacific, where on 1 November 1943 he took command of Battleship Division 7, consisting of the Navy's two newest battleships, USS Iowa (BB-61), which served as Hustvedt's flagship, and USS New Jersey (BB-62).

Hustvedt's first major Pacific action was Operation Flintlock, the American invasion of the Marshall Islands in January and February 1944, during which Battleship Division 7 was part of the escort of Task Group 58.3 (Carrier Task Group 3). During Flintlock, Hustvedt participated in Operation Hailstone, a U.S. Navy combined surface and air attack on the major Japanese base at Truk Atoll on 17–18 February 1944. Detached from Task Group 50.3, his two battleships served as the center of Task Force 50.9 when it conducted a cruise around Truk under the command of Admiral Raymond A. Spruance on 17 February to intercept Japanese ships fleeing U.S. Navy airstrikes against the atoll. Late in the morning that day, a lone Japanese Mitsubishi A6M Zero (Allied reporting name "Zeke") dropped a bomb close aboard Iowa alongside the bridge wing where Hustvedt was eating lunch; his reaction was simply to say "That was my bomb" and continue eating. His two battleships went on to cripple the Japanese destroyer Maikaze – which was finished off by accompanying heavy cruisers – and to straddle the Japanese destroyer Nowaki at the extreme range of 34,000 to 39,000 yards (10,363 to 11,887 meters), although Nowaki escaped without damage and managed to fire a torpedo which passed close to New Jersey across her bow.

Hustvedt also commanded Battleship Division 7 during the Battle of the Philippine Sea in June 1944. During the action, his two battleships were among those assigned to Vice Admiral Willis A. Lee's Task Group 58.7 (Battle Line), which served as an antiaircraft screen against Japanese aircraft attempting to overfly the battleships on their way to strike at the American aircraft carrier force. Admiral Spruance, in overall command, canceled his original plan to send the battleships forward in pursuit of the Japanese fleet after the virtual destruction of Japanese air power in the area, so no surface engagement took place.

=== Later career ===
Later in 1944, Hustvedt returned to Washington, D.C., where he became a member of the General Board of the United States Navy on 24 October 1944. He served in this capacity until he retired from the Navy in 1946, being promoted to vice admiral upon retirement.

Hustvedt's career as a battleship officer had been a promising one and he had a good reputation prior to World War II. The rise of the aircraft carrier to dominance in naval warfare during that war left him with little opportunity to demonstrate his capabilities as a combat leader and prevented his possible emergence as a major World War II naval commander.

== Awards ==
Hustvedt received two awards of the Legion of Merit during his career. In addition, the United Kingdom invested him as a Knight Commander Order of the British Empire.

== Personal life ==
Hustvedt was married to Irene Cooper Hustvedt (1894–1990), a daughter of the Republic of Hawaii's co-founder Henry E. Cooper, and was survived by three children. A son, Erling H. Hustvedt (1919–2001), entered the U.S. Naval Academy in 1937 and, although dropped from the academy due to an incorrect evaluation of his eyesight, went on to become a Navy officer, seeing extensive service during World War II. A grandson, Frederick Hauck (1941–2025), became a U.S. Navy officer, fighter pilot, and astronaut in the National Aeronautics and Space Administration's Space Shuttle Program.

== Death ==
Hustvedt died of heart disease at his home in Washington, D.C., on 22 December 1978. He is buried at Arlington National Cemetery in Arlington, Virginia.

== Awards ==
- Legion of Merit (two awards)
- Mexican Service Medal
- World War I Victory Medal
- American Defense Service Medal (two awards)
- American Campaign Medal
- European–African–Middle Eastern Campaign Medal (two awards)
- Asiatic–Pacific Campaign Medal (five awards)
- World War II Victory Medal
- Order of the British Empire (United Kingdom)
