= BL 14-inch Mk VII naval gun =

BL 14-inch Mark VII
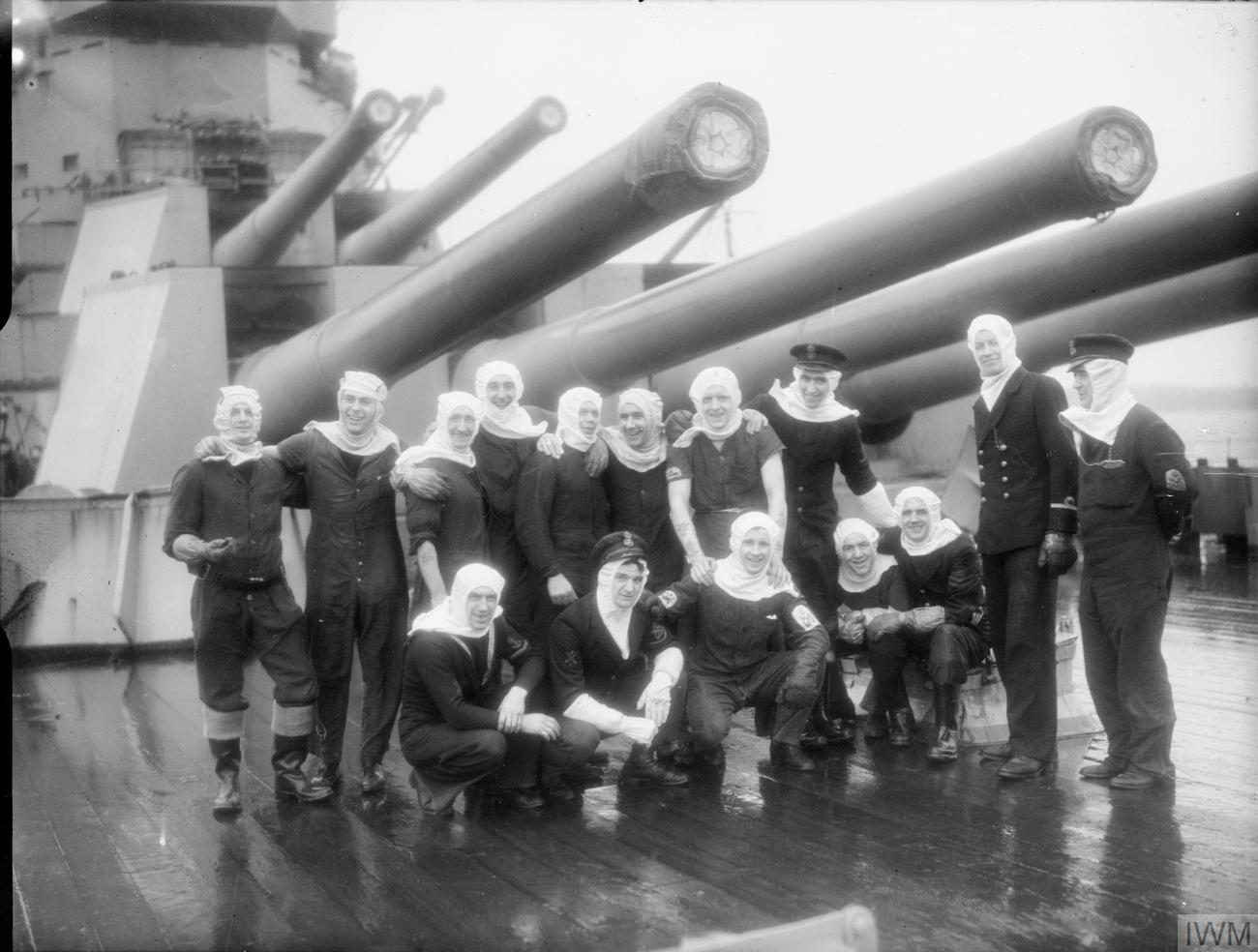
- Gunners and forward turrets of HMS Duke of York after the Battle of North Cape
- Type: Naval gun
- Place of origin: UK

Service history
- In service: 1940-1951
- Used by: UK

Production history
- Designed: 1937
- No. built: 78

Specifications
- Mass: 78.99 long tons (80.26 t)
- Length: 54 ft 3 in (16.54 m)
- Barrel length: 52 ft 6 in (16.00 m) bore (45 calibres)
- Shell: APC Mark VIIb (6crh) 721.2 kg, APC Mark 1b NT, heavy (6crh with dye) 723.7 kg
- Calibre: 14 inches (355.6 mm)
- Elevation: Naval: 41° Coastal: 45°
- Rate of fire: 2 rounds per minute
- Muzzle velocity: Standard Charge: 2,483 ft/s (757 m/s) (new gun), 2,400 ft/s (730 m/s) (25% wear)
- Maximum firing range: 38,600 yd (35,300 m) at 40° with new linings, or 36,500 yd (33,400 m) at 40.7° (25% wear)

The BL 14-inch Mk VII naval gun was a breech loading (BL) gun designed for the battleships of the Royal Navy in the late 1930s. This gun armed the King George V-class battleships during the Second World War.

== Background ==
The choice of calibre was limited by the Second London Naval Treaty, an extension of the Washington Naval Treaty which set limits on the size, armament, and number of battleships constructed by the major powers. After disappointing experiences with the combination of high velocity but relatively light shell in the BL 16 inch /45 naval gun of the Nelson-class battleships, the British reverted to the combination of lower velocities and (relatively) heavier shells in this weapon.

== Design ==
=== Gun ===
The built-up gun was of an all-steel construction, using a radial expansion design; this was an advance on earlier British heavy guns, which employed a wire-wound technology. The resulting gun was lighter, less prone to droop, more accurate and had a significantly longer barrel life. The estimated barrel life was 340 effective full charges. Length of bore: 630 inches (45 calibres long). Weight of gun (without breech or counterbalance: 77 tons 14 cwt 84 lbs. Weight of gun with counterbalance: 89 tons 2 cwt 84 lbs. Weight of breech mechanism: 1 ton 17 cwt. Rifling: polygroove, 72 grooves plain section, uniform right-hand twist of 1 turn in 30 calibres. The standard propellant charge: 338 lb (153 kg) of cordite.

The new 14-inch Armour Piercing (AP) 1,590-pound/ 721 kg shell had, relative to its size, superior ballistic performance and armour-penetration compared to previous British shells, due to improvements in design and material which had taken place since World War I. The shell also carried a proportionally large bursting charge of 39.8 lb (18.1 kg).

=== Mounting ===
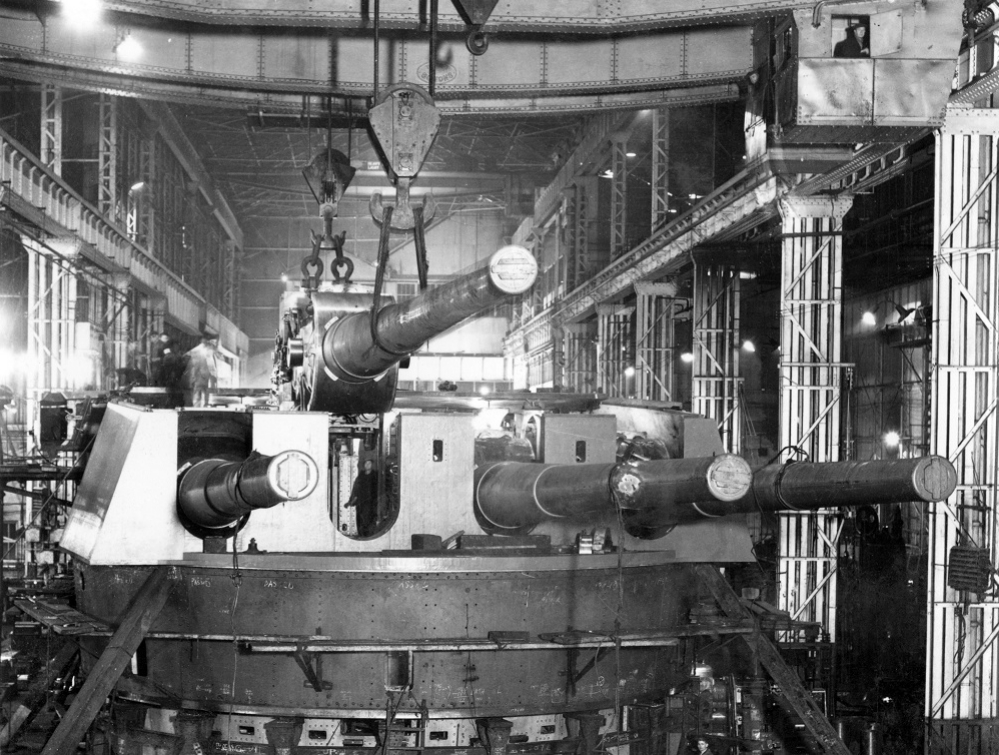
A 14-inch gun being removed from a Mark III quadruple turret in the Elswick Works

The choice of mounting was a mechanically complex quadruple turret (each battleship had two quadruple turrets (Mark III) and one twin turret (Mark II)). Although the class of battleships was initially designed with three quadruple turrets, it proved impossible to include this amount of firepower and the desired level of protection without exceeding the 35,000 ton displacement treaty limit, hence the "B" turret was changed to a smaller twin mount so the weight savings could be freed up for increased armour protection. Furthermore, the weight of a superimposed quadruple "B" turret brought the stability of the vessel into question. The turret and ammunition-handling facilities incorporated many anti-flash measures and interlocks, improving safety but adding to complexity. Revolving weight of mountings: quadruple Mk III 1,582 tons, twin Mk II 915 tons.

In service, the quad turrets proved to be less reliable than was hoped for. Wartime haste in building, insufficient clearance between the rotating and fixed structure of the turret, insufficient full calibre firing exercises and extensive arrangements to prevent flash from reaching the magazines led to problems during prolonged actions. In order to bring ammunition into the turret at any degree of train, the design included a transfer ring between the magazine and turret; this did not have sufficient clearance to allow for the ship bending and flexing. These defects were addressed, and improved clearances, improved mechanical linkages, and better training led to greater reliability in the quadruple turrets but they remained controversial.

== Performance ==
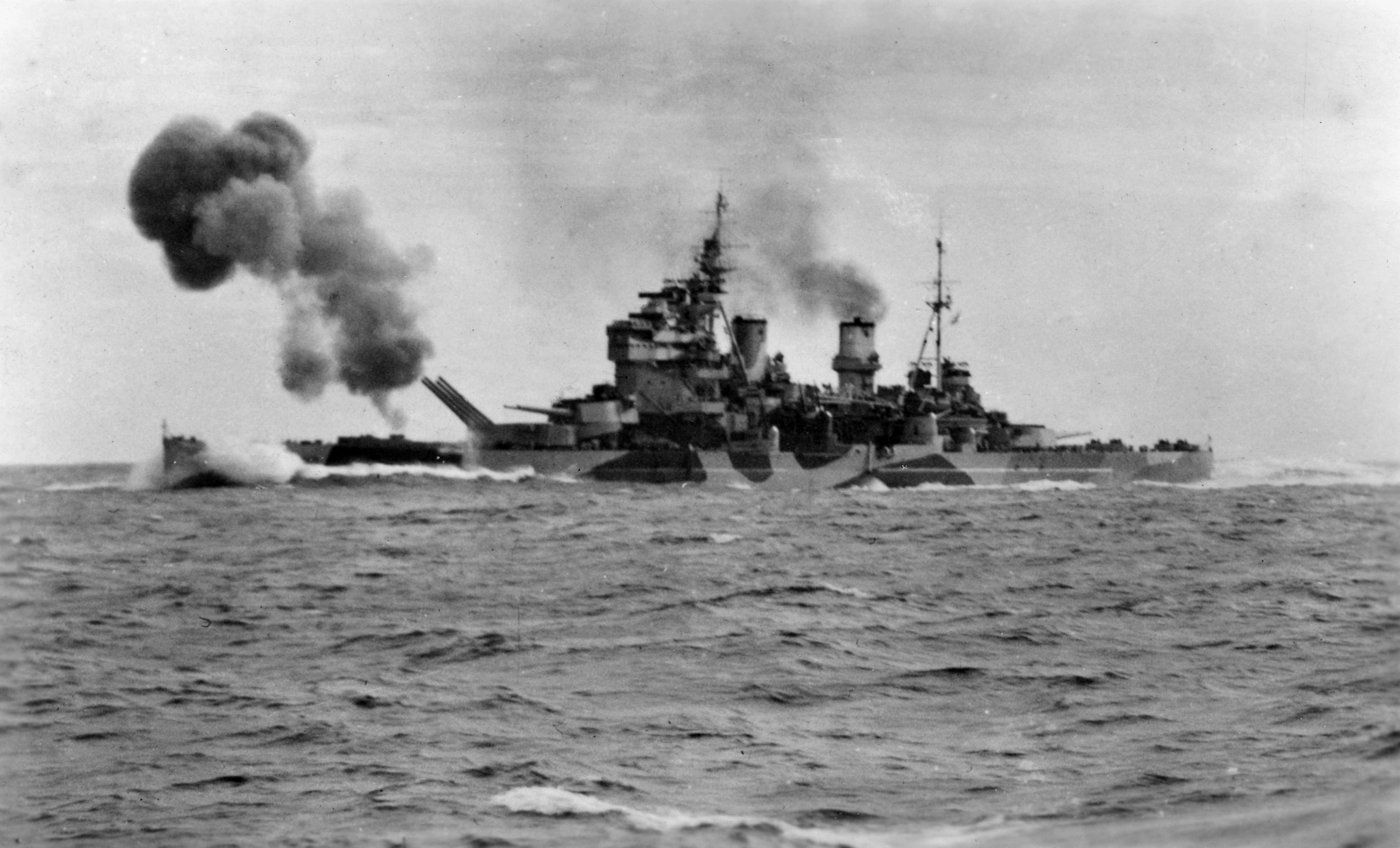
HMS Anson firing guns of 'A' turret at high elevation – c. 1942

On entering operational service the turrets gained an initial reputation for unreliability, with individual guns and entire turrets jamming in action. However, it has been argued that these jams were typically caused by errors in drill, either due to lack of gun crew training, as was the case when the newly commissioned HMS Prince of Wales engaged the Bismarck in the Battle of the Denmark Strait (1941), or due to crew fatigue resulting from the prolonged nature of the engagement, as was the case when HMS King George V engaged Bismarck in 1941 and HMS Duke of York engaged Scharnhorst in the Battle of North Cape (1943).

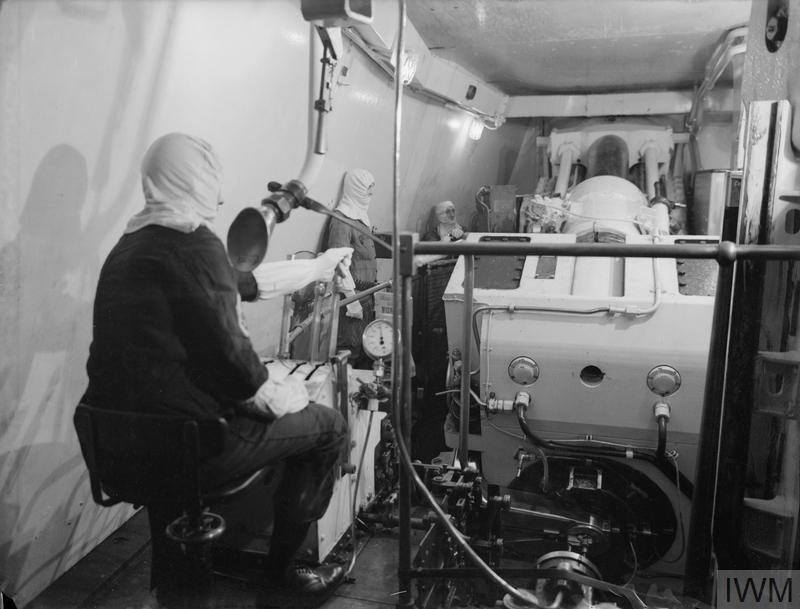
The breech of a 14-inch gun aboard HMS King George V in 1943.

During the battle against Bismarck, a close-range hit from a 14-inch shell fired by King George V, according to the King George V gunnery report, or possibly a 16-inch shell fired by Rodney, penetrated the 340 mm (13 in)-thick armour of the barbette of Bismarck's 'B' turret, causing an internal explosion which blew the rear face of the turret away. Underwater survey also shows that the 350 mm (14 in) vertical armour of Bismarck's conning tower was penetrated by 14-inch shells. In the Battle of North Cape, Duke of York fired 52 broadsides; of these 31 straddled the Scharnhorst, a fast and actively manoeuvring target, and a further 16 fell within 200 yards – an excellent performance, even when radar-control is taken into account. The effects of the 14-inch shellfire on Scharnhorst quickly degraded her fighting abilities: Duke of York's first salvo put 'A' turret out of action; 'B' turret soon followed; a subsequent hit penetrated the German ship's armour, detonating in one of the boiler rooms and reducing the vessel's speed. This reduction in speed meant that the Scharnhorst could not escape pursuit, and was responsible for her eventual destruction.

By being instrumental in the destruction of two modern enemy battleships, the 14-inch Mark VII gun was, arguably, one of the most successful battleship main armaments of World War II.

== Coastal guns ==
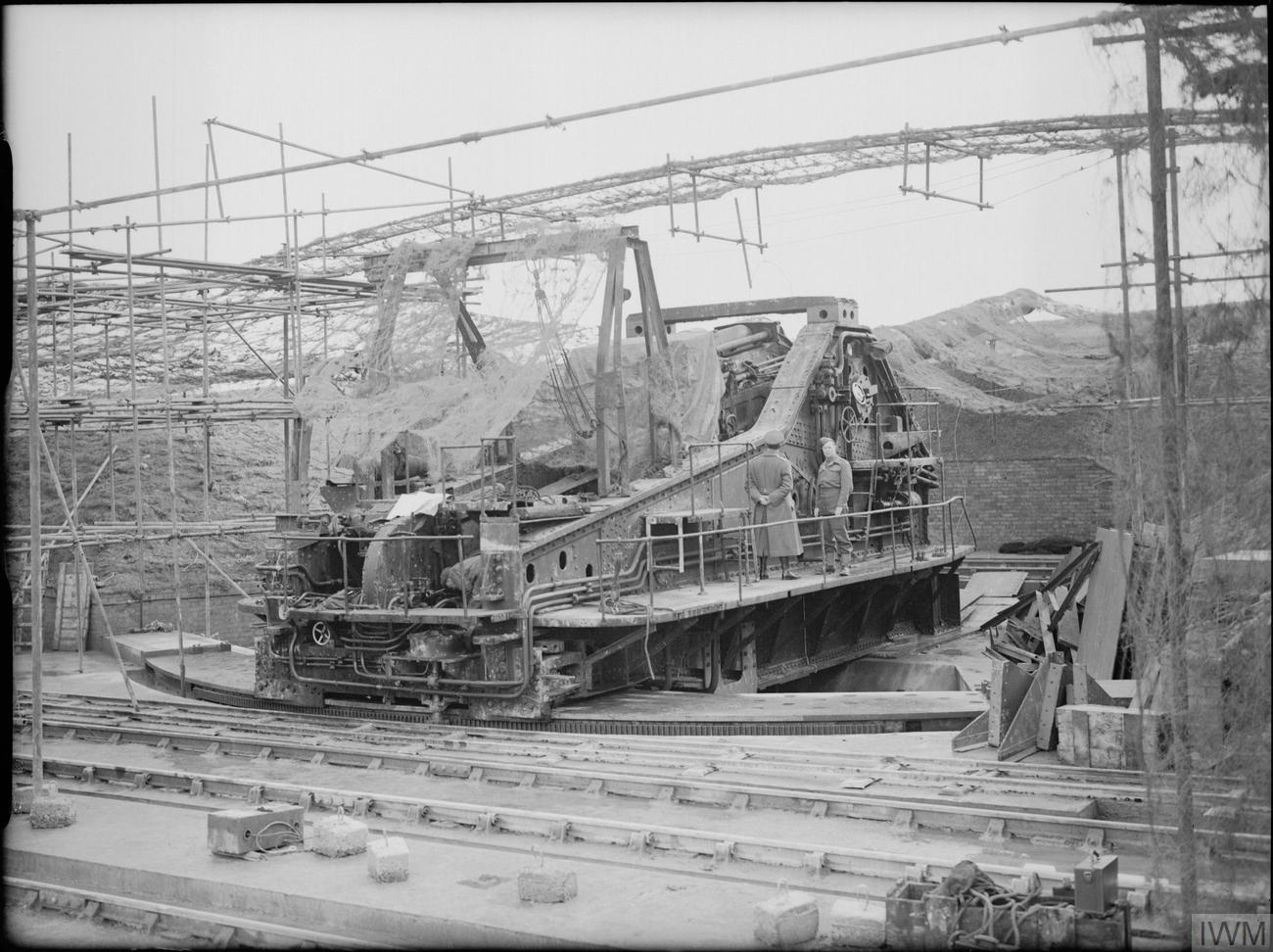
"Pooh" in March 1941

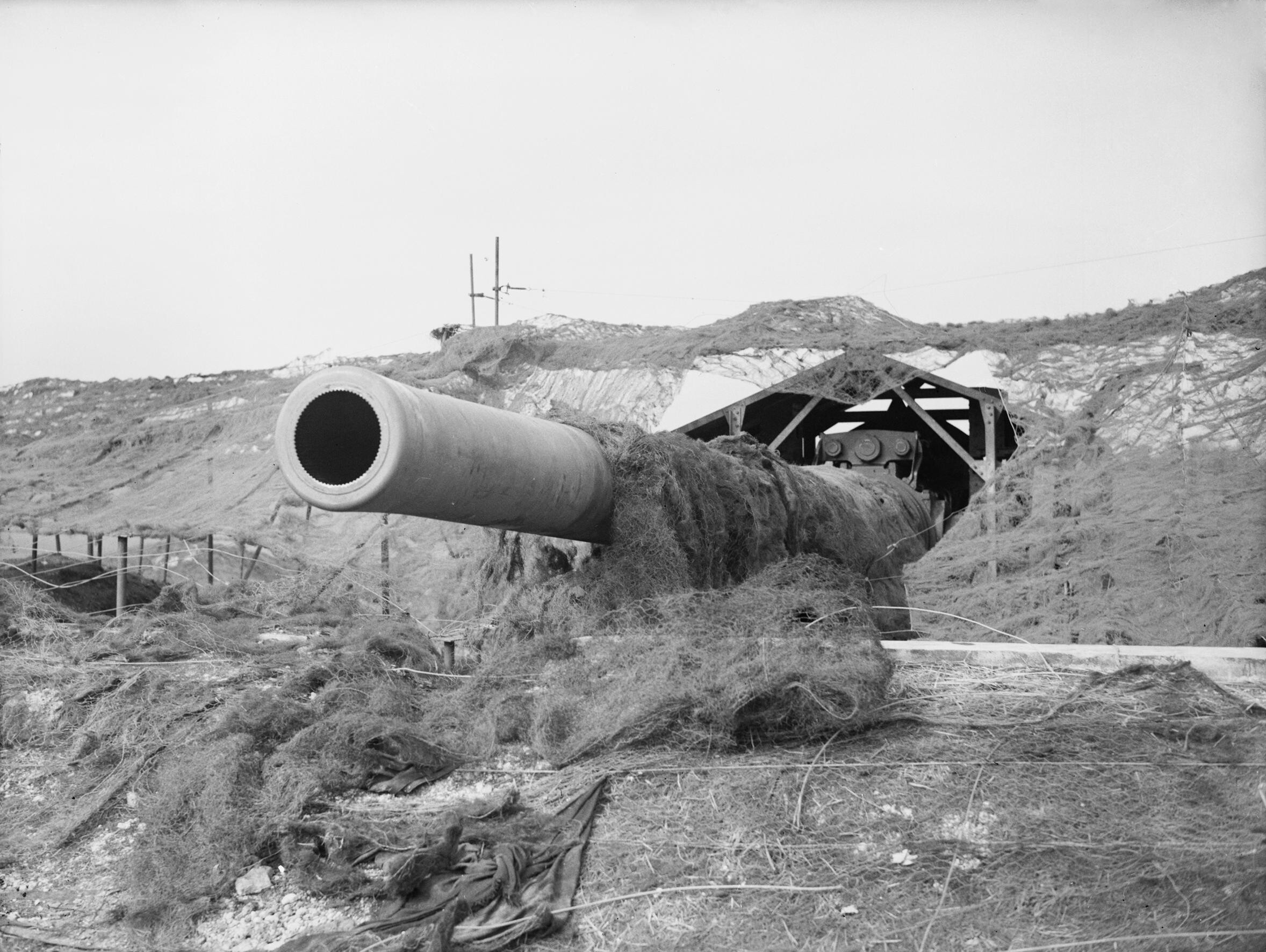
"Winnie", a 14-inch gun at St Margaret's at Cliffe near Dover, March 1941

In World War II two guns, nicknamed Winnie and Pooh, were mounted as coastal artillery near Dover to engage German batteries across the Channel in occupied France.

== Armour penetration ==
- Penetration at a muzzle velocity of 2483 ft/s, guns with new linings or with no significant wear:
- Belt
  - 729 mm (28.7 in) @ 0 m (0yd)
  - 531 mm (20.9 in) @ 9,144 m (10,000 yd)
  - 452 mm (17.8 in) @ 13,716 m (15,000 yd)
  - 389 mm (15.3 in) @ 18,288 m (20,000 yd)
- Decks
  - 33 mm (1.3 in) @ 9,144 m (10,000 yd)
  - 51 mm (2.0 in) @ 13,716 m (15,000 yd)
  - 69 mm (2.7 in) @ 18,288 m (20,000 yd)
  - 89 mm (3.5 in) @ 22,860 m (25,000 yd)
  - 107 mm (4.2 in) @ 25,603 m (28,000 yd)

Reproduced from Nav weapons.com

== Surviving example ==
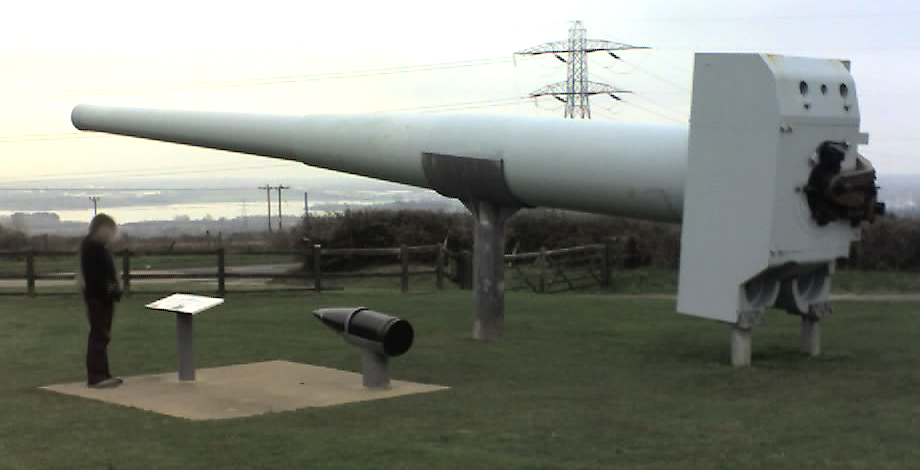
On display at Fort Nelson

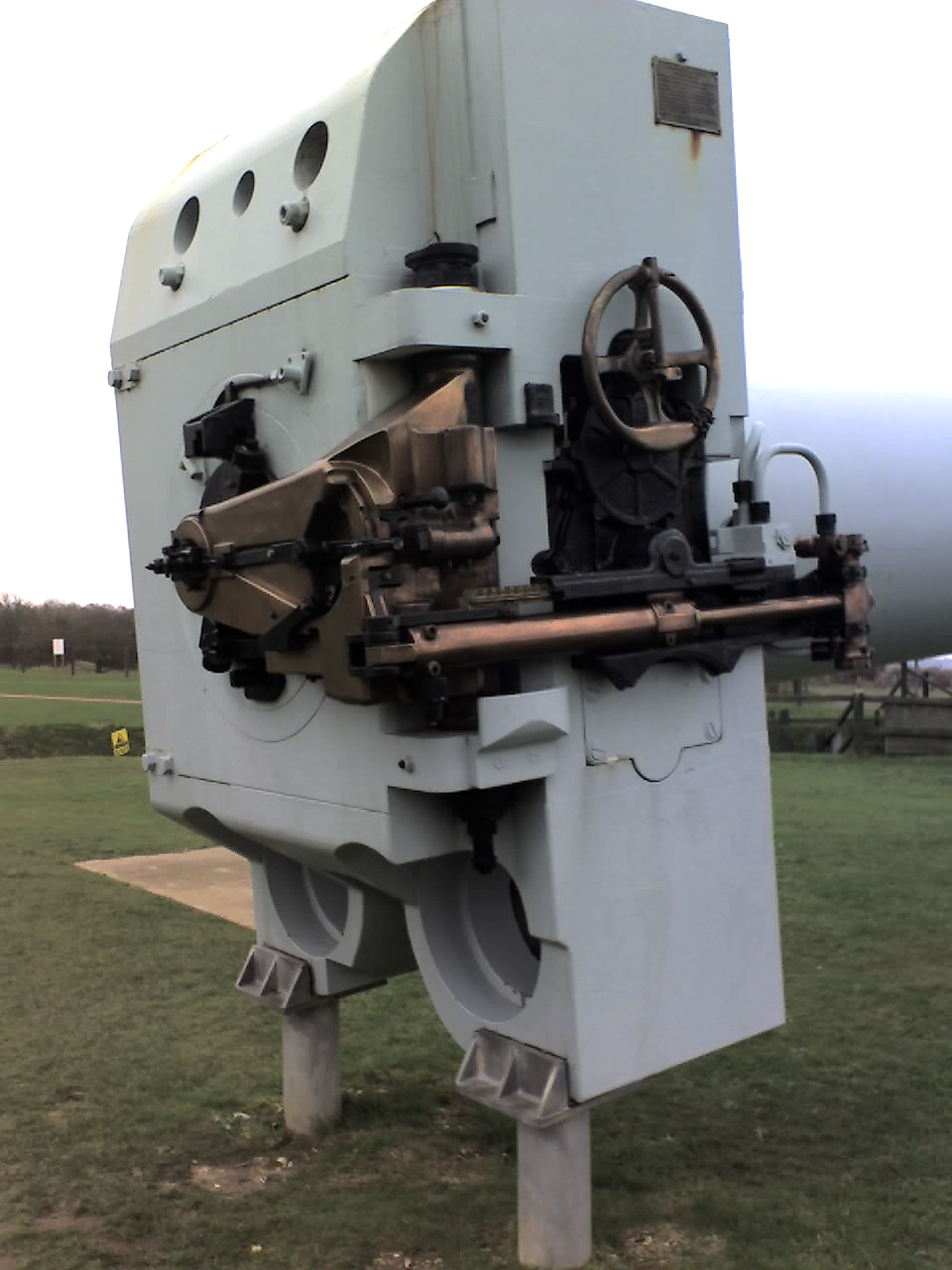
Breech detail

== See also ==
- List of naval guns
