= Operation Leader =

Successful air attack of World War II

- Part of World War II
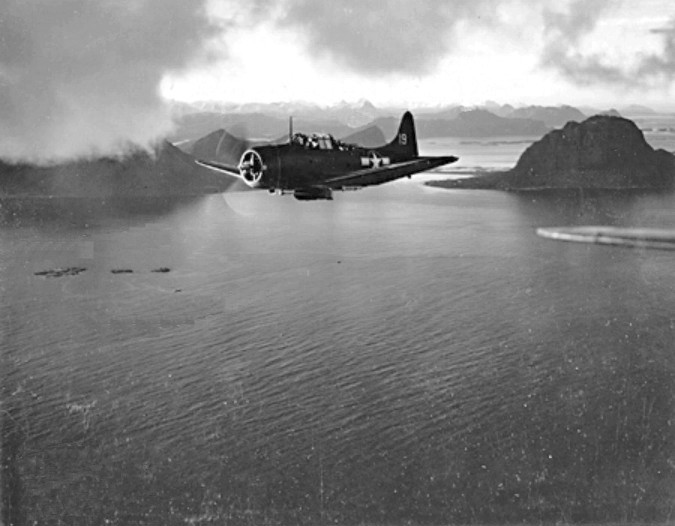
- A US Navy Dauntless dive bomber flying near the Norwegian coast during Operation Leader
Date	4 October 1943
Location	Bodø area of Norway 67°17′03″N 14°22′52″E
Result	Allied victory

Belligerents
United States; United Kingdom; Norway	Germany

Commanders and leaders
(United Kingdom) Bruce Fraser (United States) Olaf M. Hustvedt	

Strength
42 aircraft	

Casualties and losses
4 aircraft	5 ships destroyed 7 ships damaged 2 aircraft
- Bodø, a town and a municipality in Nordland county, Norway.

Operation Leader was an air attack conducted against German shipping in the vicinity of Bodø, Norway, on 4 October 1943, during World War II. Conducted by aircraft from the United States Navy aircraft carrier USS Ranger, which was part of the British Home Fleet, the raid located numerous German and Norwegian ships in the area, destroying five and likely damaging another seven. Two German aircraft searching for the Allied fleet were shot down. Additionally, three American aircraft were destroyed in combat during the operation, and one crashed while landing.

The attack followed a two-year lull in Allied aircraft carrier operations against Norway and took the German occupation forces by surprise. The choice of target was guided by intelligence gained from decoding German radio signals and reports from Norwegian Secret Intelligence Service agents; two Norwegian airmen flew with the attack force to provide advice on the local geography. In addition to sinking ships, Operation Leader damaged the German war effort by considerably disrupting the convoy system in the region and reducing shipments of iron ore.

== Background ==
During mid- to late-1943 the Home Fleet, the Royal Navy's main striking force stationed in the United Kingdom, was augmented by two forces of United States Navy warships to replace British ships dispatched to the Mediterranean and Pacific. These reinforcements were considered necessary to ensure that the fleet remained able to counter the German battle group based in Norway, which was built around the battleships Tirpitz and Scharnhorst, and the heavy cruiser Lützow.

The initial US Navy task force arrived in May, and comprised the battleships USS Alabama and South Dakota, the heavy cruiser USS Tuscaloosa and five destroyers. This force came under the command of Rear Admiral Olaf M. Hustvedt and conducted patrols into the Norwegian Sea with British warships, but did not make contact with German forces. The two battleships and the destroyers were withdrawn in August, and proceeded to the Pacific.

A second task force built around the aircraft carrier USS Ranger replaced the two battleships in September 1943. The other elements of this force were the heavy cruisers USS Augusta and Tuscaloosa, as well as five destroyers; Hustvedt remained in command. Ranger's air wing was made up of three squadrons: VF-4 with 27 Grumman F4F Wildcat fighters, VB-4 with 27 Douglas SBD Dauntless dive bombers, and VT-4 with 18 Grumman TBF Avenger torpedo bombers. Prior to Ranger's arrival the Home Fleet was assigned only a single aircraft carrier, the elderly HMS Furious, which was unavailable for operations at the time as she was undergoing a refit. Ranger had last seen combat against Vichy French forces while supporting the Operation Torch landings in Morocco during November 1942, and had later been used to ferry aircraft to North Africa and train aircrews off the United States east coast. On 8 September 1943 the main body of the Home Fleet, including the American task force, sortied in response to reports that Tirpitz, Scharnhorst and nine destroyers had put to sea. The Allied force returned to the Home Fleet's main base at Scapa Flow the next day after it was learned that the German ships had returned to port after briefly attacking Allied positions on Spitsbergen.

On 22 September the German battle group in Norway was attacked by several British midget submarines. This raid inflicted significant damage on Tirpitz, leaving the battleship unable to proceed to sea until repairs were complete. Once this was known to the Allies, the commander of the Home Fleet, Admiral Bruce Fraser, judged that the changed balance of forces would allow his force to assume a more offensive role by attacking German shipping off Norway and restarting the Arctic Convoys to the Soviet Union.

== Preparations ==
Following the midget submarine operation Fraser decided to dispatch the main body of the Home Fleet to conduct an air attack against ports and German shipping in northern Norway. Ranger was assigned responsibility for attacking the port of Bodø, which was an important rendezvous point for German and German-controlled Norwegian shipping. (Note: By the start of World War II, Norway had the world's fourth largest merchant navy. Following the German conquest of Norway in 1940, some 15 percent of the total tonnage of the Norwegian merchant navy was caught up in German-held territories. Those ships sailed in occupied Norway and between Norway and other German-occupied countries, exporting Norwegian products and bringing supplies back to Norway. On the Norwegian coast the Norwegian merchant ships brought supplies and passengers to coastal communities. Many of the vessels were confiscated by the Germans, and others forced to carry German troops and military supplies, making them targets for Allied attacks. During the war years 237 Norwegian ships in occupied territories were lost, with 1,071 people.) Fraser also initially planned to use the aircraft carrier HMS Formidable to attack shipping in the port of Brønnøysund, to the south of Bodø, but this element of the operation was cancelled due to unfavourable weather. The slow-moving Fairey Albacores on Formidable required cloud cover to operate over hostile territory. While several Luftwaffe (German Air Force) bases were located near Bodø, most of the aircraft previously stationed in northern Norway had been transferred elsewhere and those that remained posed little threat to the Allied fleet. In the case no shipping could be found, the American pilots were given as alternative targets Bodø Air Station, the oil depot in Bodø, and radar installations at Røst.

The Home Fleet's plans were informed by considerable intelligence on German shipping movements and forces in northern Norway. The Royal Navy's Operational Intelligence Centre collated information on these topics, and regularly provided assessments to the Home Fleet and other commands. The decision to attack the Bodø area was made on the basis of Ultra intelligence obtained by decoding German radio signals, from which the Allies learned that the ships in the region included the large oil tanker Schleswig, which was carrying fuel for the German battle group at Altafjord. In addition, at the time of Operation Leader two groups of Norwegian Secret Intelligence Service (SIS) agents operated radio transmitters on the coast of Helgeland: "Crux III" on the island of Renga and "Pisces" on Lurøy. (Note: During World War II, the British Secret Intelligence Service cooperated with exiled Norwegian authorities in dispatching more than 100 radio transmitters with Norwegian operators to German-occupied Norway. The first transmitter became operational on 10 June 1940, the same day regular fighting ceased in Norway. Almost exclusively situated along the coast, the SIS agents primarily reported on shipping movements. In all, some 200 Norwegian SIS agents operated clandestinely in occupied Norway, supported by around 2,000 local helpers. Of the people involved, 26 agents and at least 9 locals lost their lives, either by being killed in action with German troops, being executed, or dying as a consequence of captivity.) Both groups provided reports to the Allies on the weather and shipping movements in the target area in the lead-up to the attack. From 3 October onwards, "Crux III" radioed weather reports every half hour.

== Attack ==
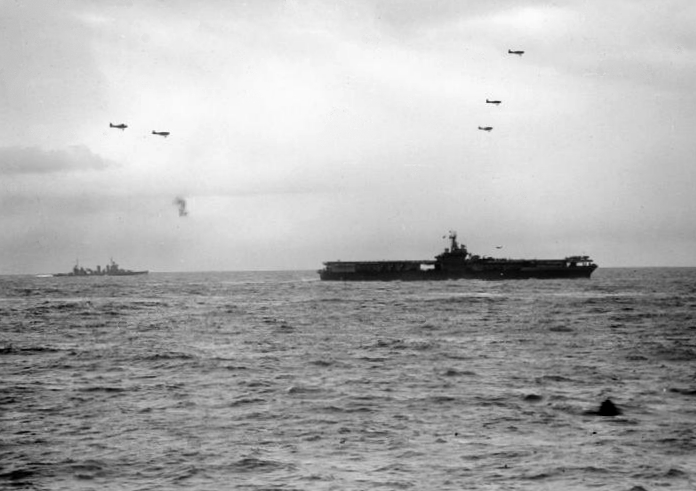
USS Ranger and USS Tuscaloosa underway during the air strike

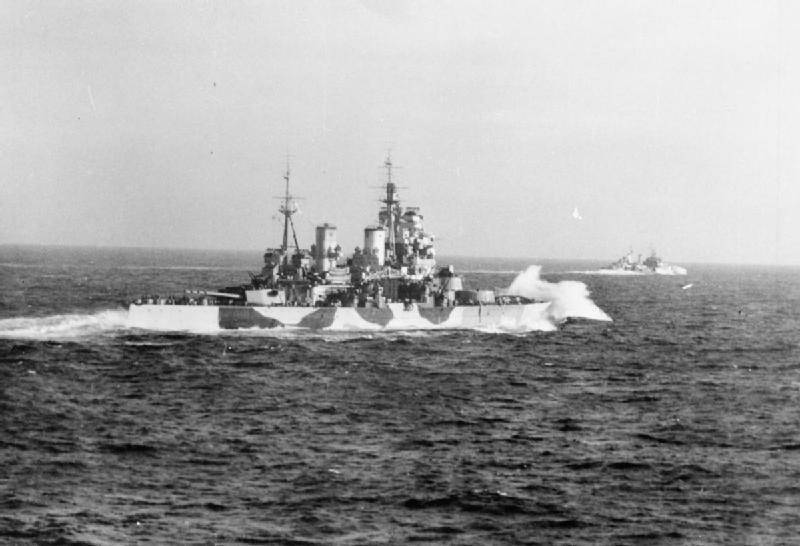
HMS Anson and HMS Belfast underway

The Home Fleet sailed from Scapa Flow on 2 October 1943. The British elements of the force were the battleships HMS Duke of York (Fraser's flagship) and Anson, the light cruiser HMS Belfast and seven destroyers. The US Navy component comprised Ranger, Tuscaloosa and four destroyers. The Allied ships were not detected by German forces during their voyage north, and arrived at the flying-off position for Ranger's air wing approximately 140 miles (230 km) off Bodø shortly before dawn on 4 October.

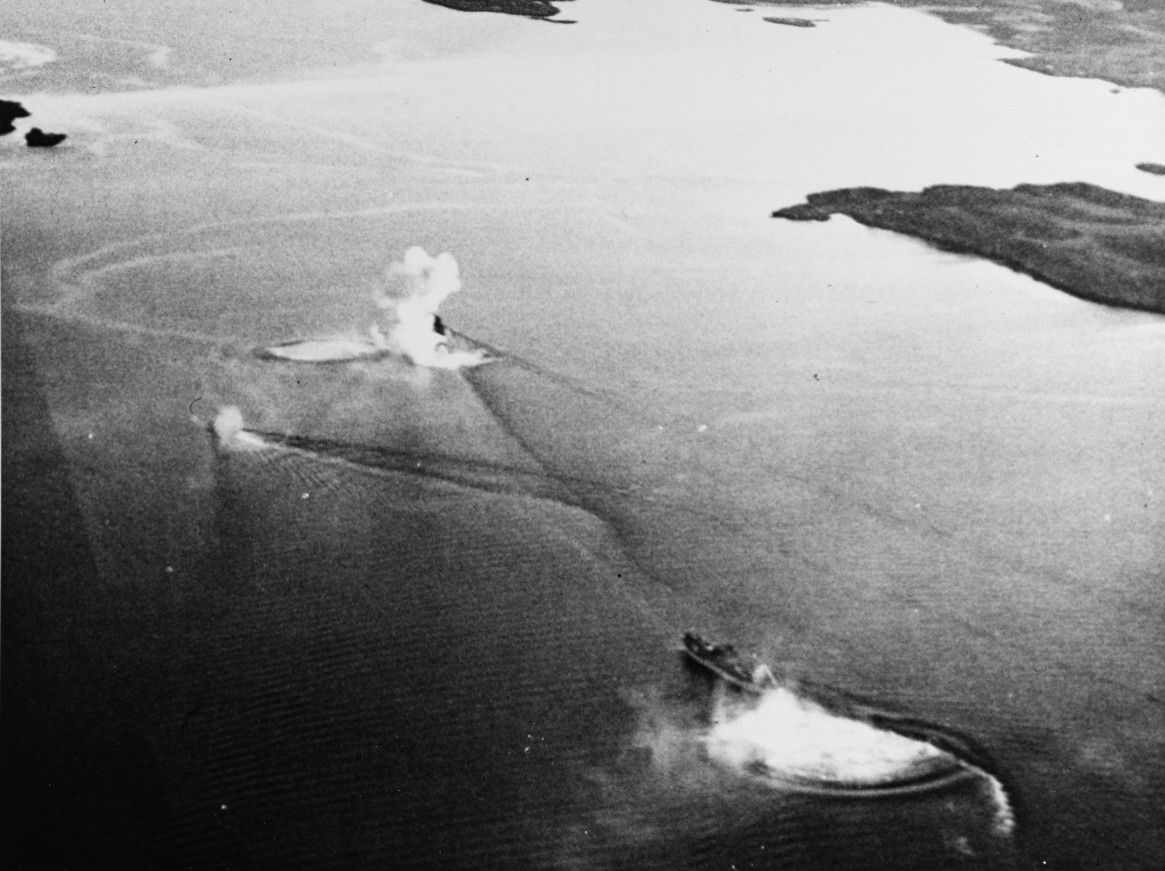
The tanker Schleswig and the minesweeper M 365 under attack

The US Navy attack force was organised into two groups of aircraft: the Northern Attack Group, which was to strike shipping at Bodø, and the Southern Attack Group, which was to target ships near the town of Sandnessjøen nearly 100 miles (160 km) to the south. Both groups had one Norwegian navigator from No. 333 Squadron RAF in the lead aircraft, providing knowledge of the local geography.

The Northern Attack Group, which comprised 20 Dauntless dive bombers escorted by eight Wildcat fighters, began to take off at 6:18 am. These aircraft flew at low altitude towards Bodø until their crews sighted Myken Lighthouse, and then turned to the north and climbed as they neared the target area. Weather conditions were clear, and the air crews had good visibility. Four Dauntlesses and a pair of Wildcats were detached from the force shortly after it passed Myken Lighthouse to search for German shipping near Åmøya island. They soon sighted the 8,000 GRT German freighter La Plata, and two of the dive bombers attacked the ship. The Americans believed that La Plata was badly damaged, and the six aircraft rejoined the main body of the Northern Attack Group.

In the meantime the other American aircraft continued north, sighting but not attacking many small cargo ships and fishing boats. At 7:30 am they located a German convoy comprising the steamer Kerkplein and the tanker Schleswig under the escort of the minesweeper M 365. Eight of the Dauntlesses attacked Schleswig and another pair targeted Kerkplein, inflicting significant damage on both. One of the escorting Wildcats was damaged by gunfire during the attack and returned to Ranger. Schleswig was beached to avoid sinking, and later salvaged and brought to Bodø for repairs. Following this engagement, the eight Dauntlesses which had yet to drop their bombs continued on to Bodø where they attacked four small German cargo ships: the 2,719 GRT ore carrier Rabat was sunk, Cap Guir was badly damaged, Malaga received minor damage from a near miss, and the small steamer Ibis was machine-gunned. Two of the dive bombers were shot down by anti-aircraft guns located on the shore and ships. The crew of one of the aircraft survived and were taken prisoner after ditching into the sea, but both men on the other Dauntless were killed.

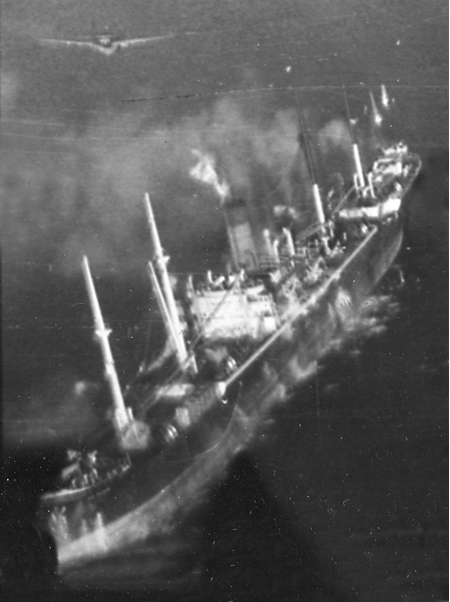
The freighter La Plata being strafed by Wildcat fighters

The Southern Attack Group began launching from Ranger at 7:08 am. It was made up of ten Avenger torpedo bombers and six Wildcats. Two of the Avengers attacked the 4,991 GRT Norwegian cargo ship Topeka off the island of Løkta south of Sandnessjøen; the ship was set on fire and beached to avoid sinking. Three of the Norwegian crew members on Topeka were killed in the attack, along with several German soldiers manning anti-aircraft guns on board the ship. One of the attacking aircraft was shot down by anti-aircraft fire from the shore with only its pilot, Lt(jg) John H. Palmer, surviving. Topeka was carrying a cargo of cement and timber, and had until the previous evening been sailing in an escorted German convoy. Local fishermen made their way to the burning vessel to help rescue those on board.

Following the attack on Topeka the American aircraft continued north, and bombed and sank the 687 GRT Norwegian cargo liner Vaagan off Fagervika without loss of life. The crew of Vaagan had observed the bombing of Topeka and brought their unarmed ship close to shore, lowering the lifeboats in preparation for a possible attack. Vaagan was carrying a cargo mostly of food for civilian consumption, and the sinking led to a margarine shortage in parts of northern Norway. (Note: Following the sinking of several coastal steamers from 1941 onwards, the exiled Norwegian authorities lobbied the Allies to not attack Norwegian coastal shipping. This eventually led to an agreement in 1943 whereby British authorities issued instructions for pilots not to attack unescorted ships smaller than 1,500 GRT on the coast of Norway. In several cases these instructions failed to prevent attacks on small Norwegian coasters. Before striking Vaagan the American aircraft observed and avoided attacking numerous Norwegian fishing vessels.) The force then bombed La Plata, causing her to be beached on the island Rødøya where the ammunition on board exploded, and she burned for several days. The aircraft also bombed the 4,300 GRT Kriegsmarine troop ship Skramstad (a Norwegian cargo ship requisitioned with her crew by the German occupying authorities), which had some 850 German soldiers embarked and was protected by two escorts. Skramstad was severely damaged and beached, burning for days. The number of casualties on board this ship are unclear, with some sources stating that 200 of the troops died while others report that only one Norwegian sailor and a few German soldiers were killed. The Norwegian resistance movement claimed after the attack that around 360 Germans had been killed in the bombing of Skramstad, while the official German reports state that 37 soldiers died. The American aircraft also strafed the German cargo ship Wolsum and attacked the ammunition barge F231, which was hit by a bomb and beached. After all the aircraft had completed their attacks, the force returned to Ranger shortly before 9:00 am. As well as the four American aircraft destroyed, six suffered damage from anti-aircraft artillery.

The German response to the raid was hampered by a shortage of capacity within the local military communication network. Following the attacks, a German report described their channels of communications as "constantly noisy with interruptions" during the attack. This prevented the Germans from sending warnings once the attack had begun.

== Aftermath ==
A memorial (left) for the American pilots killed during Operation Leader, next to a memorial to Norwegian war dead from the area near Nesna Municipality

At about 2 pm on 4 October, as the Home Fleet was sailing westwards, three German reconnaissance aircraft approached Ranger, which was covered by a combat air patrol of two pairs of Wildcats, which were guided to intercept the German aircraft. One pair shot down a Junkers Ju 88 bomber 22 miles (35 km) from the carrier, and the other pair shot down a Heinkel He 115 float plane 13 miles (21 km) from Ranger. The remaining aircraft, a Ju 88, was not sighted, and escaped. These were the first German aircraft to have been shot down by US Navy aircraft. One of the Wildcats crashed during landing; its pilot survived. All of the elements of the Home Fleet dispatched for Operation Leader returned to Scapa Flow by 6 October.

Wartime Allied military commanders and post-war historians deemed Operation Leader a success. Rear Admiral Hustvedt believed that the best result of the attack was that it demonstrated that American and British ships could work together with "effectiveness, mutual understanding and complete cooperation". Admiral Patrick N. L. Bellinger, the air commander of the US Navy's Atlantic Fleet, was also pleased with the performance of the aircrews. Captain Gordon Rowe, commanding officer of Ranger, did however point out that the Dauntless and Wildcat aircraft employed in the operation were outdated and that the US Navy "...should not ask our pilots to fight in obsolete aircraft when better types are available...". Following the operation the commander of the Southern Attack Group, Commander J. A. Ruddy, was decorated with the Distinguished Flying Cross, while other servicemen taking part in the operation were awarded the Air Medal and the Purple Heart. The British official historian Stephen Roskill judged that the attack was an "outstanding success", especially as it was the first combat mission for sixty percent of the aircrews involved.

Historian Robert C. Stern wrote in 2012 that it was difficult to determine how many ships were sunk during Operation Leader as some of the vessels which were run ashore were possibly refloated and repaired. He assessed that five ships, with a total of approximately 19,000 gross register tonnage of carrying capacity: Cap Guir, La Plata, Rabat, Skramstad and Vaagan, were probably destroyed. According to Norwegian sources pre-dating Stern's assessment by decades, two ships, Rabat and Vaagan, were sunk, and three, La Plata, Skramstad and Topeka, were damaged beyond repair. The German naval historian Jürgen Rohwer lists the ships destroyed by aircraft in Operation Leader as La Plata, Rabat, Skramstad, Topeka, and Vaagan. Cap Guir, assessed by Stern as probably destroyed, survived, and was eventually sunk by Soviet torpedo bombers in the Baltic in April 1945. In his 1974 book Deutschlands Handelsschiffe 1939–1945, the German maritime historian Karl-Heinz Schwadtke gives the same list as Rohwer for German ships destroyed in Operation Leader. Schwadtke states that La Plata and Rabat were the German vessels lost off the Bodø area on 4 October 1943, and lists Cap Guir as sunk in 1945.

While German and Norwegian sources mostly give the same number and names of ships destroyed in Operation Leader, English-language authors are more split in their estimates. While writers like British aviation author Christopher Chant, American military historian Eric M. Hammel, American historian James P. Levy, British military historian Chris Mann, and American aviation author Barrett Tillman, list five ships as destroyed, others like American military historians Kermit Bonner and Spencer C. Tucker write that six ships were sunk. Stern has also written that the disruption to the convoys off Norway caused by Operation Leader would have caused even greater damage to the German war effort than the shipping losses. This is in line with a wartime assessment by the British Ministry of Economic Warfare, which estimated that the raid was the main factor responsible for a 58 percent decrease in the amount of iron ore shipped from the important northern Norwegian port of Narvik during October 1943.

Operation Leader was both the only offensive operation undertaken by the US Navy in northern European waters during World War II, and the last major American operation in this theatre of the war. Ranger remained with the Home Fleet until being replaced by British aircraft carriers in late November 1943, during which time she took part in a patrol of the Norwegian Sea. The carrier departed Scapa Flow on 26 November, and arrived in Boston on 6 December. Ranger was used to train aircrews and transport aircraft for the remainder of the war, with no further combat.

The German forces in Norway were taken by surprise during Operation Leader. The area had not been raided by carrier-borne aircraft for two years, and preparations for such an attack were inadequate. Precautions against further raids were put in place, and the British carrier forces which repeatedly attacked Norway until the end of the war did not encounter any concentrations of shipping like that located by Ranger's airmen off Bodø. Operation Leader revealed a serious weakness in the composition of the German armed forces in occupied Norway, which were lacking sufficient numbers of combat aircraft to respond effectively to Allied attacks. Following the attack, the Germans searched the area for radio transmitters, arresting several local Norwegians and narrowly missing the agents of the "Pisces" group. The two members of the "Pisces" team were evacuated to the United Kingdom by Consolidated PBY Catalina flying boat on 24 November 1943. The last SIS agents of the "Crux" group were evacuated from Renga by a No. 330 Squadron RAF Catalina on 6 June 1944, but the transmitter on the island continued sending reports to the United Kingdom for the duration of the war, manned by a local volunteer who had been trained by the agents.

The wreck of the Avenger torpedo bomber shot down in the operation was located off Fagervika with the help of local Norwegians in 1987, and partially salvaged by the Royal Norwegian Navy. The remains of two of the airmen killed in the operation were recovered from the sea. A memorial honouring the airmen killed in the operation was erected at the former site of a German coastal artillery position at Fagervika. The memorial was dedicated on 4 October 1987 in the presence of US dignitaries and relatives of one of the airmen killed in Operation Leader. Included in the memorial is one of the three propeller blades recovered from the Avenger wreck, the other two blades being displayed at the National Naval Aviation Museum in Pensacola, Florida and at the Norwegian Home Guard base in Søvik, near Sandnessjøen. The memorial at Fagervika has been used as the site of remembrance ceremonies organized by the Norwegian Reserve Officers' Federation and with the participation of American veterans of Operation Leader.

One of the two Douglas SBD Dauntless dive bombers shot down in the operation was located in 1990 and partially salvaged in 1993, with its engine put on display at the Norwegian Aviation Museum in Bodø. The remains of the Dauntless' two crew members, Lt(jg) Clyde A. Tucker, Jr., and his turret gunner, ARM2c Stephen D. Bakran, were recovered from the wreck and identified at the Nordland Central Hospital in Bodø. The 50th anniversary of Operation Leader on 4 October 1993 was commemorated in Norway by the issuing of a first-day postal cover and the unveiling of a sculpture at Bodø Airport.
