= HMS Duke of York (17) =

King George V-class battleship of the Royal Navy

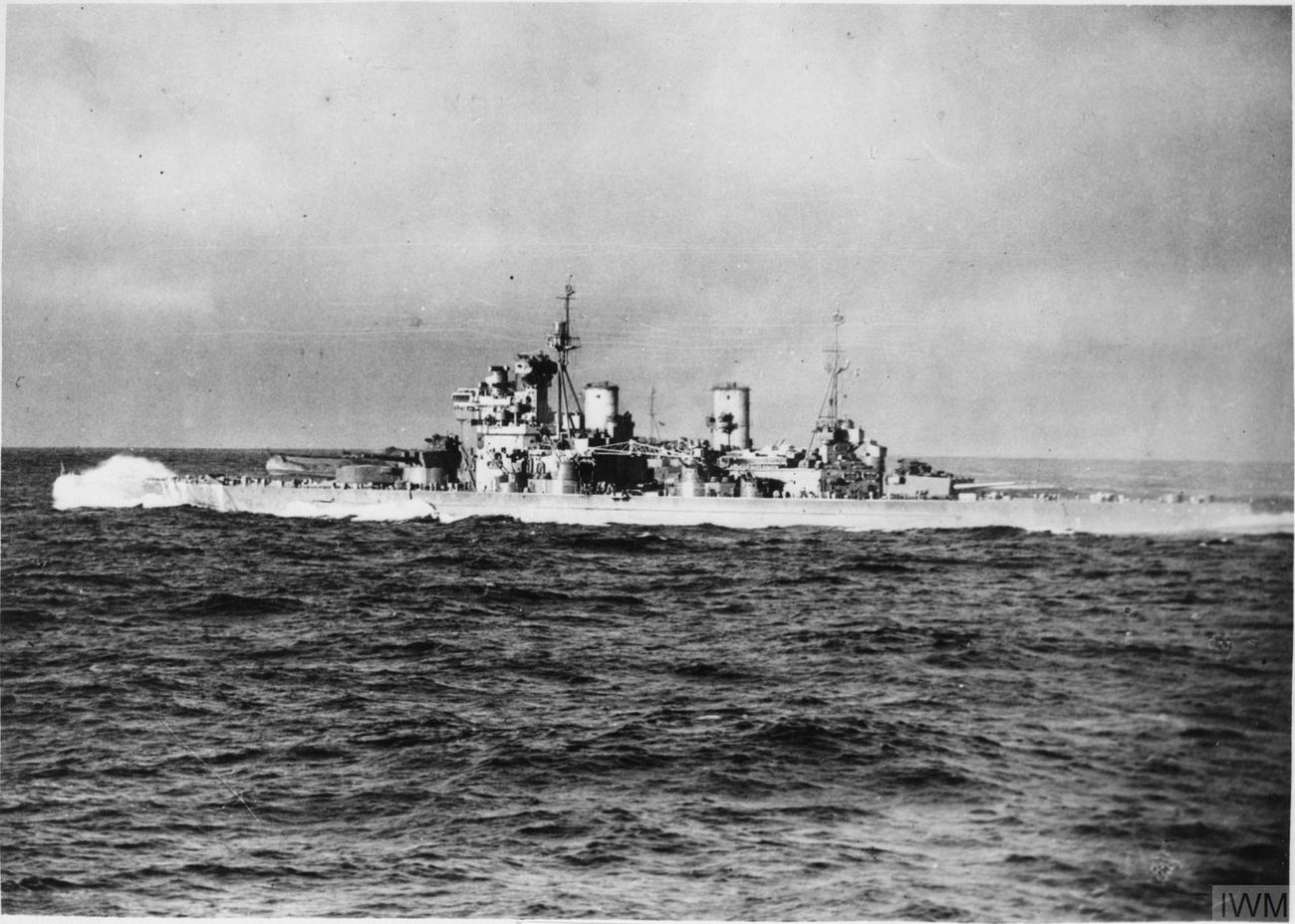
- Duke of York in March 1942, while escorting Convoy PQ 12

History

United Kingdom
- Name: Duke of York
- Namesake: George VI (previously the Duke of York)
- Ordered: 16 November 1936
- Builder: John Brown and Company, Clydebank
- Laid down: 5 May 1937
- Launched: 28 February 1940
- Completed: 4 November 1941
- Commissioned: 20 August 1941
- Decommissioned: November 1951
- Stricken: 18 May 1957
- Identification: Pennant number: 17
- Fate: Ordered to be scrapped, 8 May 1957

General characteristics (as built)
- Class & type: King George V-class battleship
- Displacement: 42,046 long tons (42,721 t) (deep load)
- Length: 745 ft (227.1 m) (o/a)
- Beam: 103 ft 2 in (31.4 m)
- Draught: 33 ft 3 in (10.1 m)
- Installed power: 8 × Admiralty 3-drum boilers; 110,000 shp (82,000 kW)
- Propulsion: 4 geared steam turbine sets
- Speed: 28.6 knots (53.0 km/h; 32.9 mph) (trials)
- Range: 5,600 nmi (10,400 km; 6,400 mi) at 10 knots (19 km/h; 12 mph)
- Complement: 84 officers and 1,530 ratings as flagship
- Sensors & processing systems: 1 × Type 281 early-warning radar; 1 × Type 273 surface-search radar; 1 × Type 284 gunnery radar; 4 × Type 285 gunnery radars; 4 × Type 282 gunnery radars
- Armament: 2 × quadruple, 1 × twin 14 in (356 mm) guns; 8 × twin 5.25 in (133 mm) DP guns; 6 × octuple 2 pdr 40 mm (1.6 in) AA guns; 6 × single 20 mm (0.8 in) AA guns
- Armour: Main Belt: 14.7 in (370 mm); Deck: 5–6 in (127–152 mm); Main turrets: 12.75 in (324 mm); Bulkheads: 10–12 in (254–305 mm); Conning tower: 3–4 in (76–102 mm)
- Aircraft carried: 2 × Supermarine Walrus amphibious flying boats
- Aviation facilities: 1 × double-ended catapult

HMS Duke of York was one of five King George V-class battleships built for the Royal Navy (RN) during the late 1930s. Completed in November 1941, during the Second World War, the ship transported the Prime Minister, Winston Churchill, to the United States to meet President Franklin D. Roosevelt the following month. Between March and September 1942 she was assigned to convoy escort duties in the Arctic as the flagship of the Second Battle Squadron, but in October she was transferred to Gibraltar where she became the flagship of Force H. The following month, Duke of York played a minor role in the Allied invasion of North Africa. After the invasion, the ship became the flagship of the Home Fleet, participating in diversionary operations designed to draw the Germans' attention away from Operation Husky, the invasion of Sicily in July 1943. In October, Duke of York covered a force of Allied ships that attacked German shipping off Norway (Operation Leader).

In December 1943 the ship was part of a task force that encountered the German battleship Scharnhorst off the North Cape of Norway. During the engagement that followed, Scharnhorst hit Duke of York twice with little effect, but was herself hit by 10 shells from Duke of York's guns. One of these hits slowed the German ship, allowing her to be torpedoed and sunk by the accompanying destroyers. In 1945, the ship was assigned to the British Pacific Fleet (BPF) as its flagship, but arrived too late to see any action before Japan surrendered. After the war, she resumed her role as the flagship of Home Fleet until she became the flagship of the Reserve Fleet in 1949. Two years later she was mothballed. She was placed on the disposal list in 1957 and scrapped the following year.

== Background ==
In the aftermath of the First World War, the Washington Naval Treaty was signed in 1922 in an effort to stop an arms race developing between Britain, Japan, France, Italy and the United States. This treaty limited the number of ships each nation was allowed to build and capped the displacement of capital ships at 35,000 long tons (36,000 t). These restrictions were extended in 1930 by the London Naval Treaty, although France and Italy refused to sign it. Both nations laid down a pair of battleships armed with 15-inch (380 mm) gun by 1934, although these nominally complied with the tonnage limit of the naval treaties. The Admiralty had already made plans to build a new class of battleships compliant with all of the treaty restrictions once the RN could legally begin construction after the London Naval Treaty expired on 1 January 1937.

A clause in the Second London Naval Treaty of March 1936 further limited the maximum calibre of the guns which battleships could carry to 14 inches (356 mm), although the treaty contained an "escalator" clause that permitted the calibre to be increased to 16 inches (406 mm) if any of the nations that signed the original Washington Treaty failed to sign it by 1 April 1937. The Admiralty was anxious to get the King George V-class ships into service as quickly as possible and declined to wait until the deadline passed since design work with the smaller guns had been completed and the first two ships had already been ordered with construction to commence on 1 January 1937.

== Description ==
Duke of York had a length overall of 745 feet (227.1 m), a beam of 103 feet 2 inches (31.4 m) and a deep draught of 33 feet 3 inches (10.1 m). She displaced 37,754 long tons (38,360 t) at light load and 42,046 long tons (42,721 t) at deep load as completed. By 1945 her deep displacement had increased to 44,794 long tons (45,513 t) with the installation of additional weapons, equipment and the manpower needed to operate them. Her metacentric height was 8.14 feet (2.5 m) at deep load as built. By 1945, it had decreased to 7.19 feet (2.2 m). Her crew numbered 84 officers and 1,530 ratings as a squadron flagship and 104 officers and 1,578 ratings as a fleet flagship.

The King George V class was powered by four Parsons geared steam turbine sets, each driving one propeller shaft using steam provided by eight Admiralty 3-drum water-tube boilers. The propulsion machinery was configured in a staggered unit system with each pair of boilers normally feeding one turbine, but they could be cross-connected with each other to minimise the effects of any damage. The turbines were rated at 100,000 shp (75,000 kW), but could deliver 110,000 shp (82,000 kW) at emergency overload. (Note: The King George V-class battleships had their steam plant specifications revised during the building phase, and as built the ships actually produced 110,000 shp (82,000 kW) at 230 rpm, and were designed for an overload power of 125,000 shp (93,000 kW) which was exceeded in service when Prince of Wales developed 134,000 shp (100,000 kW).) During Duke of York's speed trials on 1 November 1941, she reached 28.6 knots (53.0 km/h; 32.9 mph) from 111,200 shp (82,900 kW) at deep load. The ship carried 3,588 long tons (3,646 t) of fuel oil which was later increased to 3,879 long tons (3,941 t) in 1945. Duke of York had a range of 5,600 nmi (10,400 km; 6,400 mi) at 10 knots (19 km/h; 12 mph) in 1944.

=== Armament, fire-control equipment and aviation ===
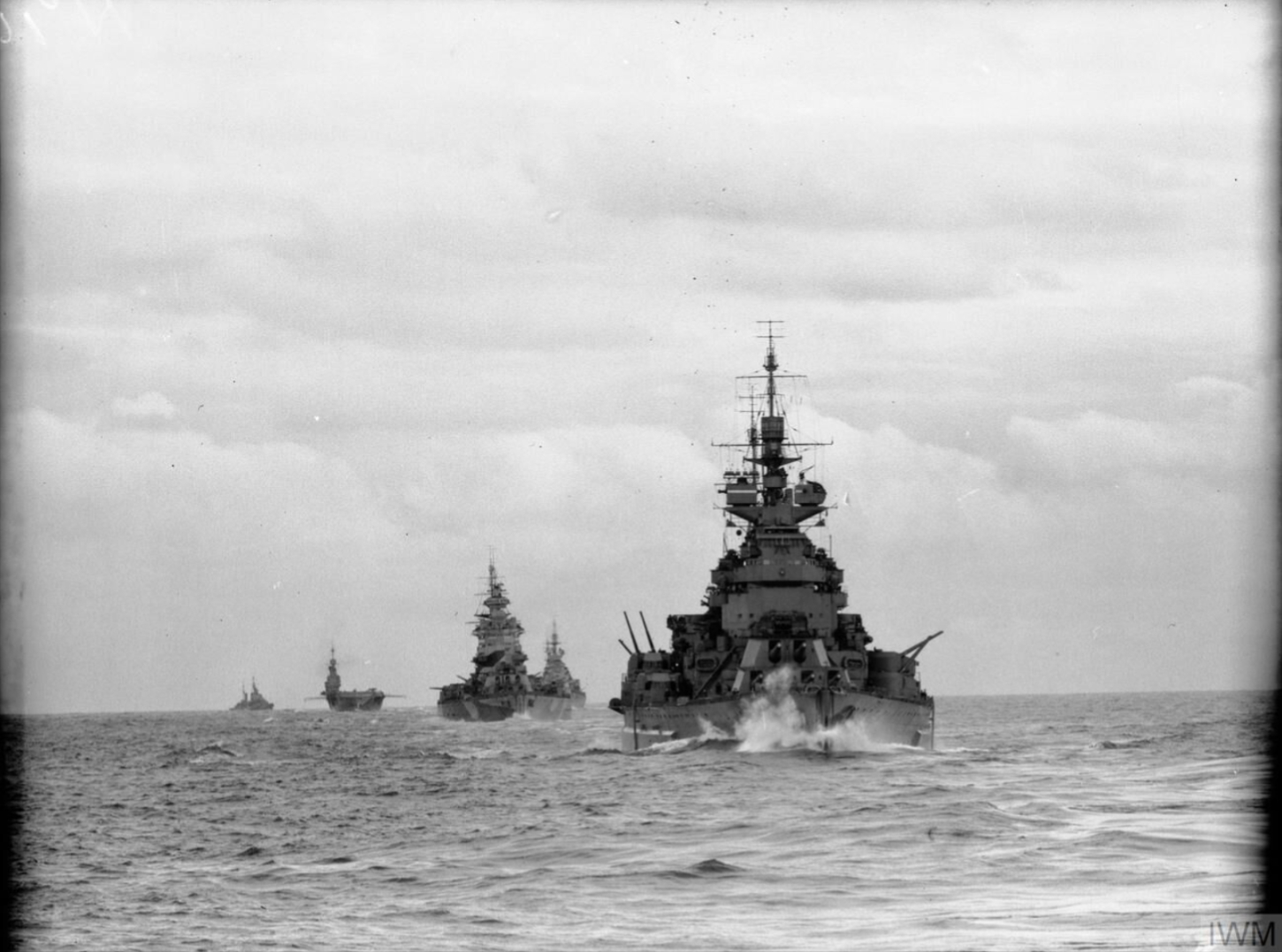
Duke of York leads Nelson, Renown, Formidable, and Argonaut during Operation Torch.

The main battery of the King-George V-class ships consisted of 10 BL 14 in (356 mm) Mk VII guns, two quadruple-gun turrets, one forward and one aft of the superstructure with one twin turret superfiring over the forward quadruple turret. From front to rear the turrets were designated "A", "B" and "Y". The secondary armament consisted of 16 QF 5.25 in (133 mm) Mk I dual-purpose guns which were mounted in eight twin-gun turrets amidships. Duke of York's light anti-aircraft suite consisted of six octuple QF 2-pounder (40 mm (1.6 in)) Mk VIII "pom-pom" guns in power-driven mountings. One mounting each was located on the roof of "B" and "Y" turrets. The remaining mounts were located on the forward superstructure, two on each broadside. These were supplemented by six 20 mm (0.8 in) Oerlikon AA guns in single, hand-worked, mounts. Two of these were positioned on the quarterdeck on the centreline while the other were in the superstructure.

The King George Vs were equipped with two director-control towers (DCT), one was located above the bridge (nautical) and the other on the aft superstructure. These controlled the main guns; The forward DCT was fitted with a 22-foot (6.7 m) rangefinder while the rear one had one 15 feet (4.6 m) wide. "B" turret could also control all of the main guns and was fitted with a 30-foot (9.1 m) duplex rangefinder. The other turrets had 41-foot (12.5 m) rangefinders for use in local control. Four Mark V HACS directors with 15-foot rangefinders were positioned aboard Duke of York near the DCTs to control the secondary battery. Each "pom-pom" mount had an associated Mark IV director.

The ship was initially equipped with a Type 281 early-warning radar with separate transmission and receiver antennas, and a Type 273 surface-search radar. A Type 284 gunnery radar was mounted on the forward DCT while each HACS director was fitted with a Type 285 gunnery radar. The "pom-pom" directors were equipped with Type 282 radars.

Duke of York was equipped with a fixed catapult amidships for two Supermarine Walrus flying boats. Each amphibian was provided with a hangar in the forward superstructure.

==== Late-war refit ====
In preparation for service against the Japanese, Duke of York's radars and anti-aircraft suite were upgraded and increased in number from September 1944 to April 1945. The Type 281 radar was replaced by an upgraded Type 281B model with a single antenna on the mainmast. A pair of Type 274 gunnery radars, one each on the forward and aft DCTs, replaced the existing Type 284 set. The Type 273 equipment was exchanged for Type 293 and Type 277 radars; in addition to surface-search modes, the latter set had a height-finding capability. Two additional Type 282 sets were added for the additional "pom-pom" directors installed.

To make room for the additional anti-aircraft weapons and relieve overcrowding, the aircraft were removed as were most of their equipment. The hangars and catapult area were converted into mess decks, recreational spaces and boat stowage. A pair of quadruple mounts for 40 mm (1.6 in) guns added on the rear superstructure as were a pair of octuple mounts for 2-pounder "pom-pom"s. Four quadruple mounts for 2-pounder guns were installed on the forward superstructure and another pair on the quarterdeck. All of the single Oerlikon mounts abaft the breakwater were removed and redistributed across the ship. Duke of York had a total of 38 single Oerlikon mounts and eight twin-gun mounts when the refit was completed.

=== Protection ===
The waterline belt of the King George V-class ships was composed of Krupp cemented armour (KCA) and protected 414 feet (126.2 m) of the hull between the leading edges of the main gun barbettes to form the sides of the armoured citadel in three strakes. The main deck served as the belt's upper edge and it extended downwards 23 feet 6 inches (7.2 m) of which 8 feet 6 inches (2.6 m) was below the normal waterline. The two upper strakes of armour were 14 inches thick covering the propulsion machinery spaces, but increased to 15 inches (381 mm) abreast the main magazines. The upper edges of the plates of the lowest strake were equally as thick, but tapered down to thicknesses of 4.5–5.5 inches (110–140 mm) abreast the propulsion machinery and magazines, respectively. The lowest strake continued forward towards the bow 40 feet (12.2 m) and gradually reduced to a thickness of 11 inches (280 mm) the closer it got to the bow. The bottom edges of the plates tapered down from 5.5 inches to 5 inches (127 mm). The strake continued towards the stern 36 feet (11 m) and were configured identically to the forward extension. The front and rear ends of the citadel were closed off by KCA transverse bulkheads fore and aft of the main-gun barbettes. Extending from the main deck down to the lower deck, the plates ranged in thickness from 12 to 10 inches (300 to 250 mm) in thickness with the thicker plates being closer to the sides of the ship.

The KCA faceplates of the main-gun turrets were 13 inches thick and the KCA forward side plate was 9 inches (230 mm) in thickness. The rest of the turret armour consisted of non-cemented armour plates. Those of the rear sides and rear were 7 inches (180 mm) thick while the roof plates were 6 inches (150 mm) thick. The KCA armour of the barbettes for the 14-inch gun turrets were 13 inches thick on the sides but tapered to 11–12 inches (279–305 mm) closer to the centreline of the ship. The side and roof armour of the 5.25-inch turrets was 1 to 1.5 inches (25 to 38 mm) thick. Protecting the conning tower were 4-inch plates fore and aft while the side plates were 3 inches thick. Its roof was 1.5 inches thick. After the Battle of the Denmark Strait in May 1941, 1.5-inch bulkheads of Ducol steel were added to the ships still under construction on the sides of the main and secondary magazines to protect them from splinters from any hits from plunging shells that might have penetrated the ship's side beneath her belt.

Like the belt armour, the main deck of the armoured citadel varied over what it protected. It was five inches thick over the propulsion machinery and six inches thick over the magazines. The rear lower deck stretched almost to the stern and varied in thickness between five-inch plates closest to the citadel while the rest of the deck consisted of three-inch plates. The lower deck forward armour continued almost to the bow, varying between three and five inches in thickness with the thicker plates closer to the citadel.

The torpedo-defence system of the King George V-class consisted of a three-layer system of voids and liquid-filled compartments meant to absorb the energy of an underwater explosion. It was bounded on the inside by the 1.75-inch (44 mm) torpedo bulkhead. The side protection system had a maximum depth of 13 feet (4 m), but this decreased significantly as the ship narrowed at its ends. Over the length of the citadel, this system was found during full-scale trials to be proof against 1,000 pounds (450 kg) of TNT.

== Construction and career ==
Named for King George VI's title of Duke of York before his brother's abdication on 10 December 1936, Duke of York was the third ship in the King George V class, and was laid down at John Brown & Company's shipyard in Clydebank on 5 May 1937. The battleship was launched and christened by Queen Elizabeth on 28 February 1940. She was commissioned on 20 August 1941 by Captain Cecil Harcourt and completed on 4 November. She became the flagship of Vice-Admiral Alban Curteis, commander of the Second Battle Squadron two days later. The ship reverted to a private ship on 9 December in preparation for embarking Churchill a few days later for a trip to the United States to negotiate the Atlantic Charter with Roosevelt. She arrived at Annapolis, Maryland, on 22 December, made a shakedown cruise to Bermuda in January 1942, and departed for Scapa Flow on 17 January with Churchill returning home by air.

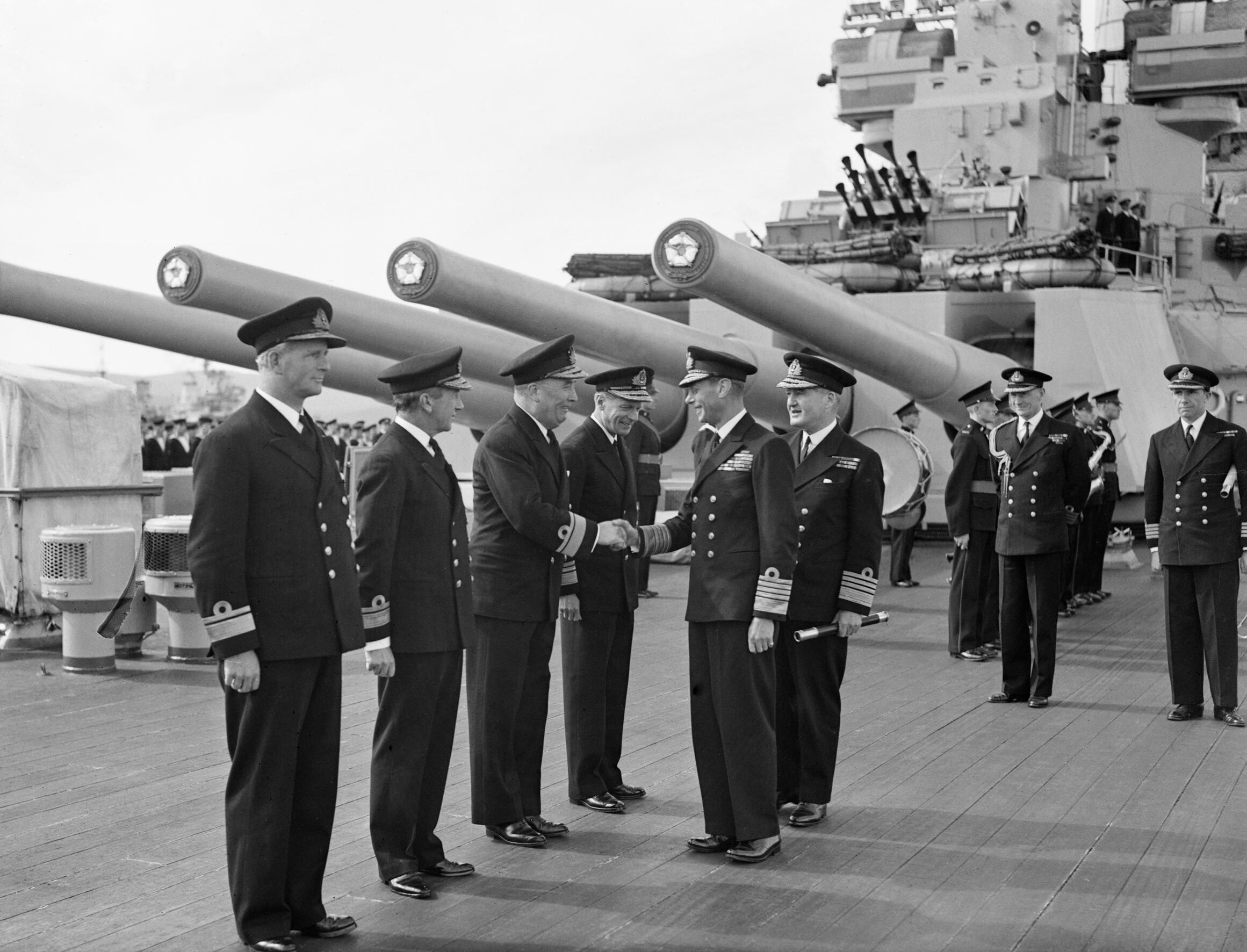
King George VI and Admiral Bruce Fraser aboard Duke of York at Scapa Flow, August 1943

On 1 March, she provided cover for Convoy PQ 12, bound for the Soviet Union, in company with the battlecruiser Renown, the light cruiser Kenya, and six destroyers. Five days later, that force was reinforced with one of Duke of York's sister ships, King George V, and the aircraft carrier Victorious, the heavy cruiser Berwick, and six destroyers as a result of Admiral John Tovey's concerns that the German battleship Tirpitz might attempt to intercept the convoy. That same day, the German battleship put to sea and was sighted by a British submarine later that evening; no contact was made, however, except for an unsuccessful aerial torpedo attack by aircraft from Victorious.

Later that month, Convoy PQ 13 was constituted and Duke of York formed part of the cover force. In late March, Duke of York, King George V, and Victorious formed the core of a support force that patrolled between Iceland and Norway to cover several convoys to the Soviet Union. On 3 April, the ship again became the flagship of the Second Battle Squadron. Around this time, her anti-aircraft armament was augmented by eight additional 20 mm Oerlikon guns: five on the bow abaft the breakwater and three more on the quarterdeck. In late April, when King George V accidentally rammed and sank the destroyer Punjabi in dense fog, sustaining significant bow damage, Duke of York was sent to relieve her and became the Home Fleet flagship while her sister was under repair. She continued in these operations through May, when she was joined by the American battleship USS Washington. King George VI visited Scapa Flow and was hosted aboard the Duke of York on 6 June. The two battleships formed the core of the Heavy Covering Force for Convoys PQ 17 and QP 13 in late June and early July. Duke of York reverted to a private ship upon her return on 8 July. In mid-September, the ship and her sister Anson formed part of the escort for Convoys PQ 18 and QP 14.

On 30 October, Duke of York was sent to Gibraltar as the new flagship of Vice-Admiral Neville Syfret, commander of Force H, and supported the Allied landings in North Africa the following month. During this time the ship came under air attack by Italian aircraft on several occasions, but the raids were relatively small scale and were swiftly dealt with by the "umbrella" provided by the aircraft from the accompanying carriers Victorious, Formidable and Furious. After this action, she returned to Britain for a refit at Rosyth that lasted from 8 December to 14 March 1943.

With her refit completed, Duke of York resumed her status as flagship of the Home Fleet when Tovey transferred his flag to her on 14 May before the departure of King George V and Howe for Operation Husky, the Allied invasion of Sicily. Admiral Sir Bruce Fraser, relieved him on 8 June. Operation Gearbox in June 1943 involved a sweep by Duke of York and Anson, in company with the US battleships USS Alabama and South Dakota, to provide distant cover for minor operations in Spitsbergen and the Kola Inlet, while the following month unsuccessful diversionary operations, code-named "Camera" and "Governor," were carried out to draw the Germans' attention away from Operation Husky. The King again visited the Fleet in Scapa Flow from 11 to 14 August, staying aboard the battleship. On 4 October, Duke of York and Anson covered a force of Allied cruisers and destroyers and the American carrier USS Ranger under Operation Leader, which successfully raided German shipping off Norway.

=== Action against Scharnhorst ===
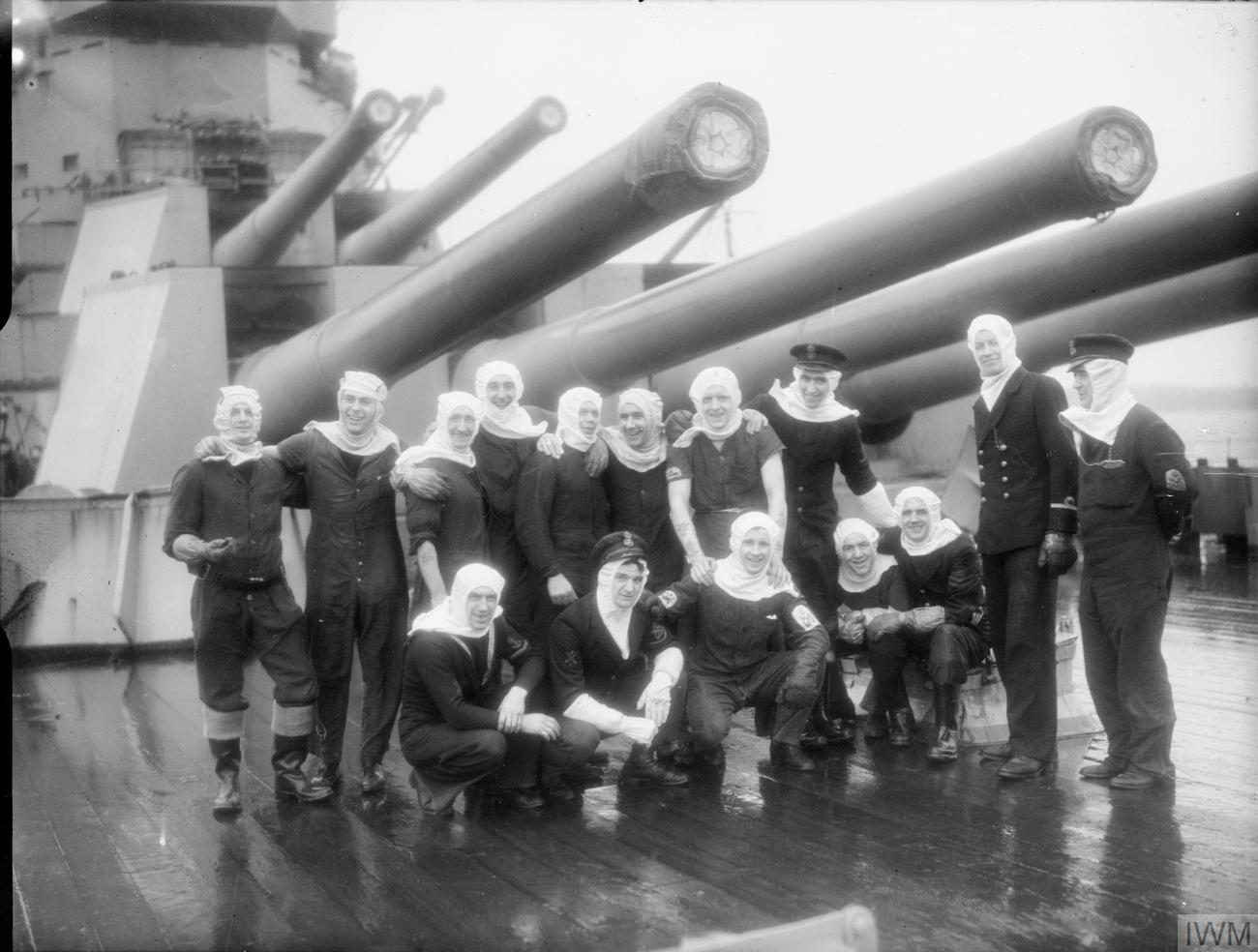
Members of Duke of York's gun crews at Scapa Flow after the Battle of the North Cape

In 1943 the German battleship Scharnhorst moved to Norway, a position whence she could threaten the Arctic convoys to Russia. With Tirpitz and a heavy cruiser also in Norwegian fjords, it was necessary for the Royal Navy to use capital ships to cover convoys between Britain and Russia. One of these convoys was sighted by the Germans in early December 1943, and Allied intelligence concluded that the following Convoy JW 55B, would be attacked by the German surface ships. Two surface forces were assigned to provide distant cover to the convoy, which had left Loch Ewe on 22 December. On 25 December 1943, Scharnhorst was reported at sea. The Force 1 cruisers Belfast, Norfolk and Sheffield, with four destroyers, made contact shortly after 09:00 on 26 December. A brief engagement occurred around 09:30, but Scharnhorst outdistanced her pursuers, and again outran them after a brief skirmish around noon.

Force 2, including Duke of York, the light cruiser HMS Jamaica and four destroyers, was closing, and it was estimated that a night action with Scharnhorst would commence around 17:15. Scharnhorst altered course, and contact was made at 16:17, at a distance of 45,500 yards (41,600 m) using Duke of York's Type 273 radar. Force 2 manoeuvred for broadside fire. Belfast, with Force 1, fired star shells at 16:47 to illuminate Scharnhorst. This failed, so Duke of York fired a star shell from one of her 5.25-inch guns, taking Scharnhorst by surprise with her main battery trained fore and aft. By 16:50 Duke of York had closed to 12,000 yards (11,000 m) and opened fire with a full ten-gun broadside, scoring one hit. Although under heavy fire, Scharnhorst straddled Duke of York a number of times and hit her twice. A 28.3-centimetre (11.1 in) shell passed through the main mast and its port leg without detonating, but fragments from the hit destroyed the cable for the main search radar. A 15-centimetre (5.9 in) shell also pierced the port strut of the foremast without exploding. At 16:55 a 14-inch (356 mm) shell silenced Scharnhorst's two forward main-gun turrets, but she maintained speed so that by 18:24 the range had opened to 21,400 yards (19,600 m), when Duke of York ceased fire after firing fifty-two broadsides. A shell from the final salvos hit and exploded in one of Scharnhorst's boiler rooms, slowing the ship and allowing the pursuing destroyers to overtake her.

Force 2's destroyers then attacked with torpedoes, firing 28, of which 3 or 4 hit. This slowed Scharnhorst, and at 19:01 Duke of York again opened fire, at a range of 10,400 yards (9,500 m), but ceased fire at 19:30 to allow the cruisers to close on the German battleship. Ten 14-inch shells had hit her, causing fires and explosions, and silencing almost all of the secondary battery. By 19:16 all of the main turrets aboard the German ship had ceased firing and her speed had been cut to 10 knots (19 km/h; 12 mph). In the final stages of the battle the destroyers fired 19 torpedoes at Scharnhorst, causing her to list badly to port, and at 19:45 she sank, taking with her over 1,700 men, after a running action that had lasted ten-and-a-half hours. After refuelling and making temporary repairs in Murmansk, Duke of York ferried the 36 survivors from the Scharnhorst back to Britain. Despite Scharnhorst's sinking, and the retreat of most of the other German heavy units from Norway, the need to maintain powerful forces in British home waters was scarcely diminished as Tirpitz remained a significant threat.

=== Subsequent operations ===
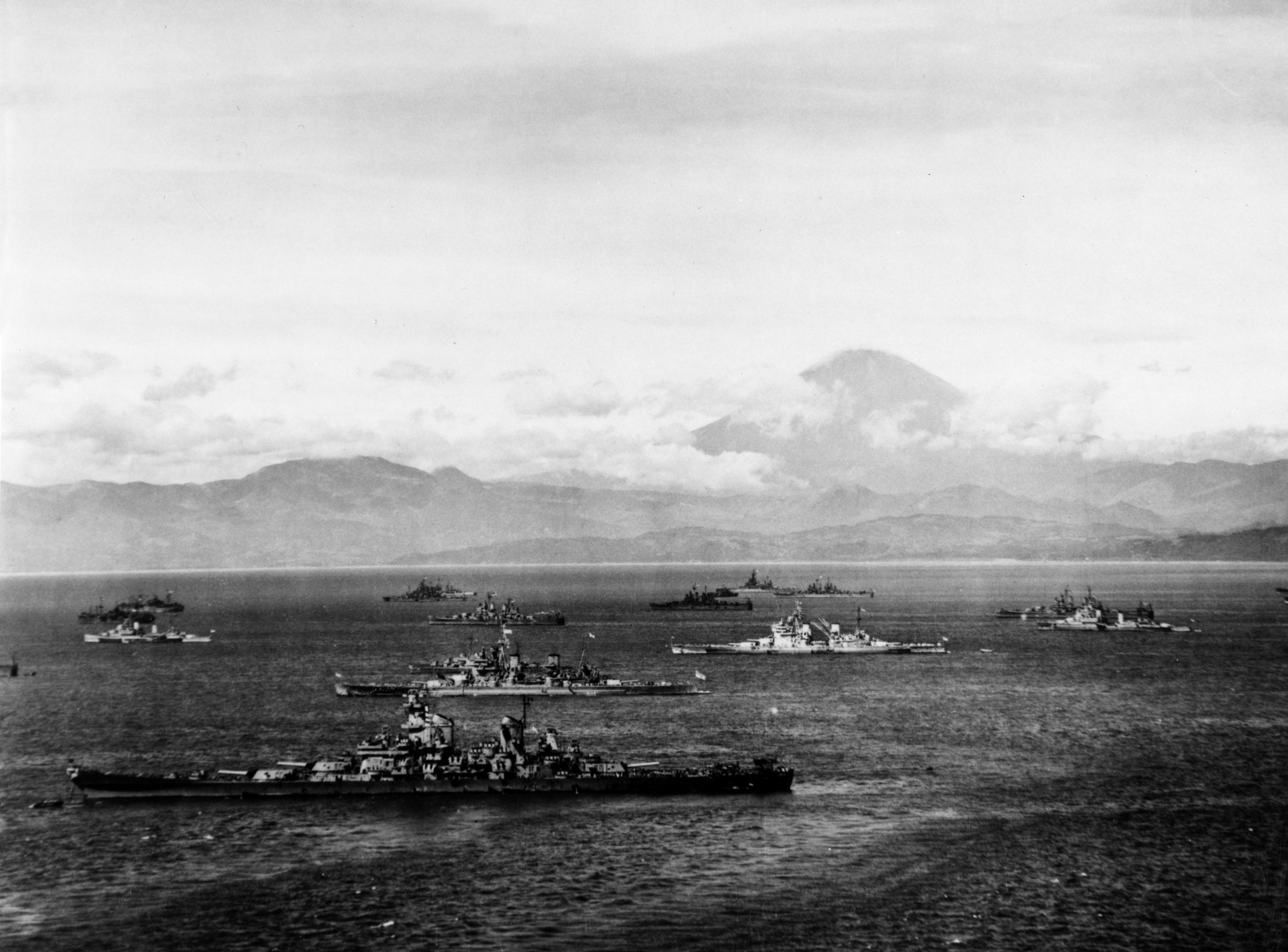
Warships of the U.S. Third Fleet and the British Pacific Fleet in Tokyo Bay, 28 August 1945, preparing for the formal Japanese surrender. Duke of York lies just beyond USS Missouri in the fore. Mount Fuji is in the background.

The ship's own guns had caused more damage than the German shells, especially the muzzle blast from "Y" turret, and she entered Rosyth Dockyard for repairs on 11 January 1944 which were completed on 24 January. A pair of single 20 mm mounts on the forward superstructure are known to have been replaced by an equal number of twin-gun mounts in early 1944, possibly during this refit. On 29 March, Duke of York, Anson and the bulk of the Home Fleet left Scapa Flow to provide distant cover for Convoy JW 58. General Sir Bernard Montgomery visited her in May and was followed a week later by the King. Admiral Sir Henry Moore relieved Fraser as Commander-in-Chief of Home Fleet on 16 June. The following month, Duke of York provided cover for carriers unsuccessfully attacking Tirpitz on 17 July (Operation Mascot) and again in mid- to late August (the Goodwood series) of air strikes on Tirpitz.

After Tirpitz was crippled by the Royal Air Force on 15 September (Operation Paravane), the Admiralty judged that Duke of York could be withdrawn from the Home Fleet and prepared for service with the British Pacific Fleet. She therefore began a lengthy refit at Liverpool on 26 September that saw her equipped with the latest radar sets and her anti-aircraft armament was heavily augmented to meet the threat posed by Japanese aircraft. In addition her sister Prince of Wales's brief sojourn in tropical waters in late 1941 had proven that the King George V-class ships' ventilation arrangements were inadequate for that environment. Steam-driven fans added to the propulsion-machinery spaces and increasing the thickness of the insulation on the machinery and piping were some of the measures taken. The King and Queen visited the ship on 27 March 1945 after the refit was completed. After working up, she sailed in company with Anson on 25 April. A problem with the ship's electrical circuitry delayed her while she was at Malta so that she did not reach Sydney, Australia, until 20 July and Guam on 9 August, too late for significant action against the Japanese Empire before its surrender. Fraser hoisted his flag as commander-in-chief of the BPF aboard her on 31 July.

Duke of York was assigned to Task Force 37 on 9 August, although she was still a week away from joining the rest of the BPF. The British task force and three American carrier task forces conducted a series of air raids on Japan, which continued until 15 August when a surrender came into effect. After the conclusion of hostilities, Duke of York and King George V participated in the surrender ceremonies that took place in Tokyo Bay on 2 September. Later that month the ship sailed for Hong Kong, to join the fleet that assembled there to accept the surrender of the Japanese garrison.

=== Post-war ===
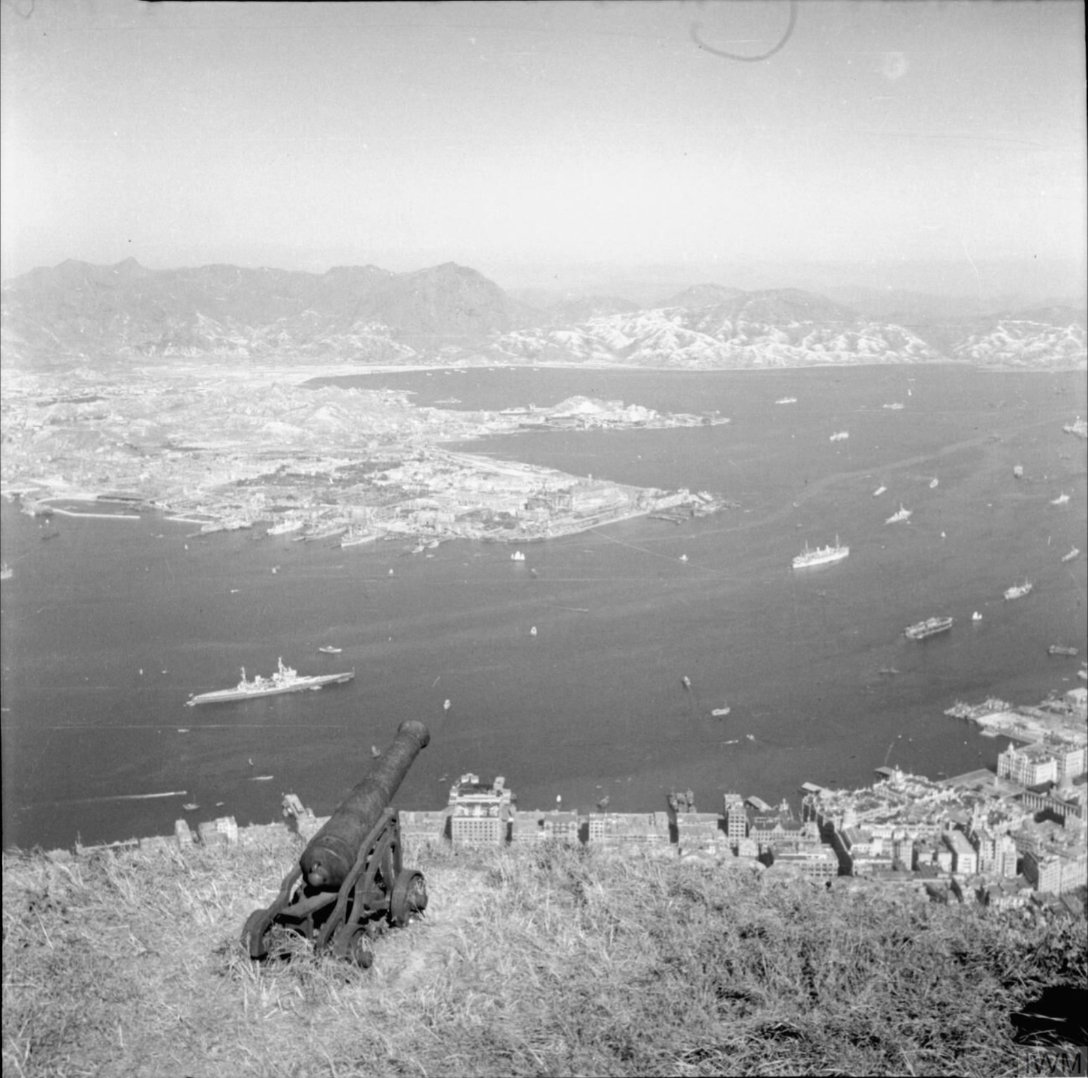
Duke of York (left) at anchor in Hong Kong Harbour, late 1945–early 1946

She visited Amoy, (now Xiamen), China, on 18–20 January 1946 and then toured Japanese ports from 15 to 27 March, before departing for Sydney for a refit at the Garden Island Dockyard that lasted from 15 April to 13 May. Duke of York departed for home on 6 June, but made a stop at Singapore where Fraser turned over the BPF to Admiral Sir Denis Boyd five days later. The ship arrived at HM Dockyard, Devenport on 11 July. She was refitted from 26 September to 23 November; it was probably during this refit that all four of the quadruple 2-pounder gun mounts were removed, as were 25 single Oerlikons.

Duke of York became the flagship of Home Fleet the following month. The ship was refitted at HM Dockyard, Portsmouth, from 3 November 1947 to 23 January 1948. She made a visit to Bermuda and the West Indies from September to November 1948. Duke of York was relieved as flagship by the aircraft carrier Implacable in April 1949. She was reduced to reserve and became flagship of the Reserve Fleet in July. The battleship was refitted at Portsmouth from 10 May to 24 February 1950. Duke of York was relieved as the flagship on 2 September 1951. The ship was mothballed by Cammell Laird at Birkenhead from September to November and was then towed to Gareloch on 6 November. All of the King George V-class ships were placed on the disposal list on 30 April 1958 and approved to be scrapped on 8 May. Duke of York was subsequently transferred to the British Iron & Steel Corporation for disposal. The ship was allocated to Shipbreaking Industries, Ltd. and arrived at the company's facility in Faslane on 18 February 1958; demolition began shortly afterwards.

The ship's bell was donated to the Duke of York School (now the Lenana School) in Nairobi, Kenya, by the RN after the battleship was demolished.

== Bibliography ==
- Burt, R. A. (2012). British Battleships, 1919–1939 (2nd ed.). Naval Institute Press. ISBN 978-1-59114-052-8.
- Buxton, Ian & Johnston, Ian (2021). Battleship Duke of York: An Anatomy from Building to Breaking. Seaforth Publishing. ISBN 978-1-5267-7729-4.
- Chesneau, Roger (2004). King George V Battleships. ShipCraft. Vol. 2. Chatham Publishing. ISBN 1-86176-211-9.
- Garzke, William H. Jr. & Dulin, Robert O. Jr. (1980). British, Soviet, French, and Dutch Battleships of World War II. Jane's. ISBN 978-0-71060-078-3.
- Lenton, H. T. (1998). British and Empire Warships of the Second World War. Naval Institute Press. ISBN 1-55750-048-7.
- Raven, Alan & Roberts, John (1976). British Battleships of World War Two: The Development and Technical History of the Royal Navy's Battleship and Battlecruisers from 1911 to 1946. Naval Institute Press. ISBN 0-87021-817-4.
- Rohwer, Jürgen (2005). Chronology of the War at Sea 1939–1945: The Naval History of World War Two (Third Revised ed.). Naval Institute Press. ISBN 1-59114-119-2.
- Silverstone, Paul H. (1984). Directory of the World's Capital Ships. Hippocrene Books. ISBN 0-88254-979-0.
- Stephen, Martin (1988). Sea Battles in Close-Up: World War 2. Naval Institute Press. ISBN 0-87021-556-6.
- Tarrant, V. E. (1991). King George V Class Battleships. Arms and Armour. ISBN 1-85409-026-7.
