= HMS Anson (79) =

King George V-class battleship of the Royal Navy

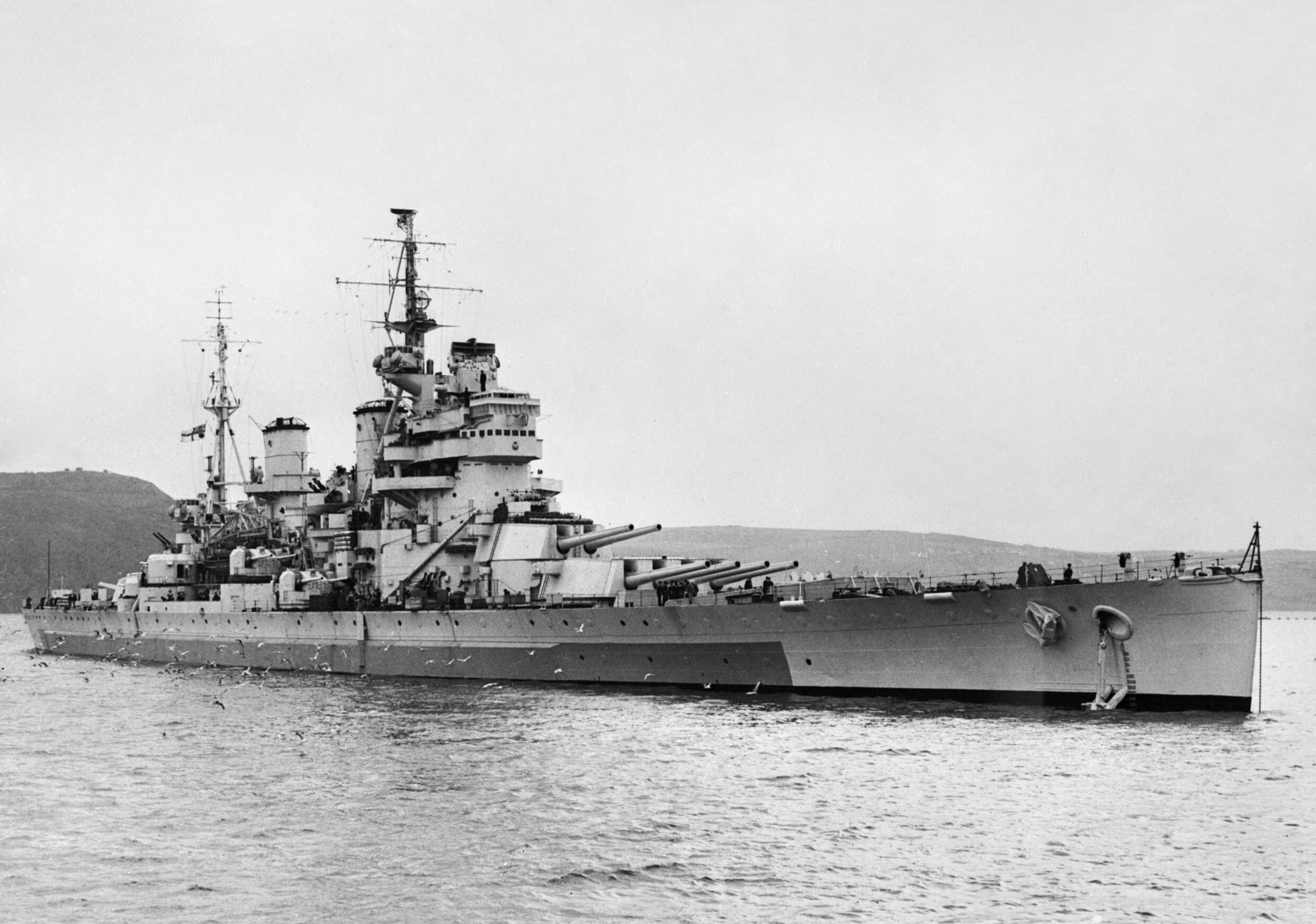
- HMS Anson at Devonport, March 1945

History

United Kingdom
- Name: Anson
- Builder: Swan Hunter, Tyne and Wear
- Laid down: 20 July 1937
- Launched: 24 February 1940
- Commissioned: 14 April 1942
- Decommissioned: November 1951
- Stricken: 18 May 1957
- Motto: Nil desperandum; ("Never Despair")
- Fate: Scrapped, 17 December 1957
- Notes: Pennant number 79

General characteristics
- Class & type: King George V-class battleship
- Displacement: 42,600 long tons (43,300 t) Trials; 45,360 long tons (46,090 t) Deep load
- Length: 744 ft 11.50 in (227.1 m) Overall; 740 ft 0 in (225.6 m) Waterline
- Beam: 103 ft 0.62 in (31.4 m)
- Draught: 34 ft 2.25 in (10.4 m)
- Installed power: 110,300 shp (82,300 kW) (trials)
- Propulsion: 4 shafts, 4 sets Parsons geared turbines; 8 Admiralty 3-drum small-tube boilers
- Speed: 29.25 knots (54.17 km/h; 33.66 mph)
- Range: 6,100 nmi (11,300 km; 7,000 mi) at 10 knots (19 km/h; 12 mph)
- Complement: 1,553–1,558 peacetime 1,900 war
- Armament: 10 × BL 14-inch (356 mm) Mark VII; 16 × QF 5.25-inch (133 mm) Mk. I; 6 × 8-barrelled QF 2-pounder 1.575-inch (40.0 mm) Mk. VIII; 18 × 20-millimetre (0.8 in) Oerlikon.
- Armour: Main Belt: 14.7 inches (370 mm); Lower belt: 5.4 inches (140 mm); Deck: 5–6 inches (127–152 mm); Main turrets: 12.75 inches (324 mm); Barbettes: 12.75 inches (324 mm); Bulkheads: 10–12 inches (254–305 mm); Conning tower: 3–4 inches (76–102 mm).
- Aircraft carried: Two Supermarine Walrus seaplanes, one double-ended catapult (removed early 1944)

HMS Anson was a King George V-class battleship of the Royal Navy, named after Admiral George Anson. She was built by Swan Hunter and Wigham Richardson Shipyard on the River Tyne and launched on 24 February 1940, being completed on 22 June 1942. Her completion was delayed to allow the fitting of fire-control radar and additional antiaircraft weapons. She was originally to have been named Jellicoe, but was renamed Anson in February 1940.

Anson saw service in the Second World War, escorting nine Russian convoys in the Arctic by December 1943. She took part in moves to draw attention away from Operation Husky in July 1943. In October the same year, she took part in Operation Leader. In February 1944, she provided cover for Operation Tungsten, the successful air strike against the German battleship Tirpitz. Rear Admiral Cecil Harcourt accepted the surrender of Japanese forces occupying Hong Kong on board Anson in August 1945, and after the end of the war, the vessel became the flagship of the 1st Battle Squadron of the British Pacific Fleet.

Anson arrived back in British waters on 29 July 1946, spending the next three years in active service with the postwar navy. She was finally placed in reserve and "mothballed" in 1949, spending eight years in this condition. On 17 December 1957, she was purchased for scrap by Shipbreaking Industries, Faslane.

== Construction ==
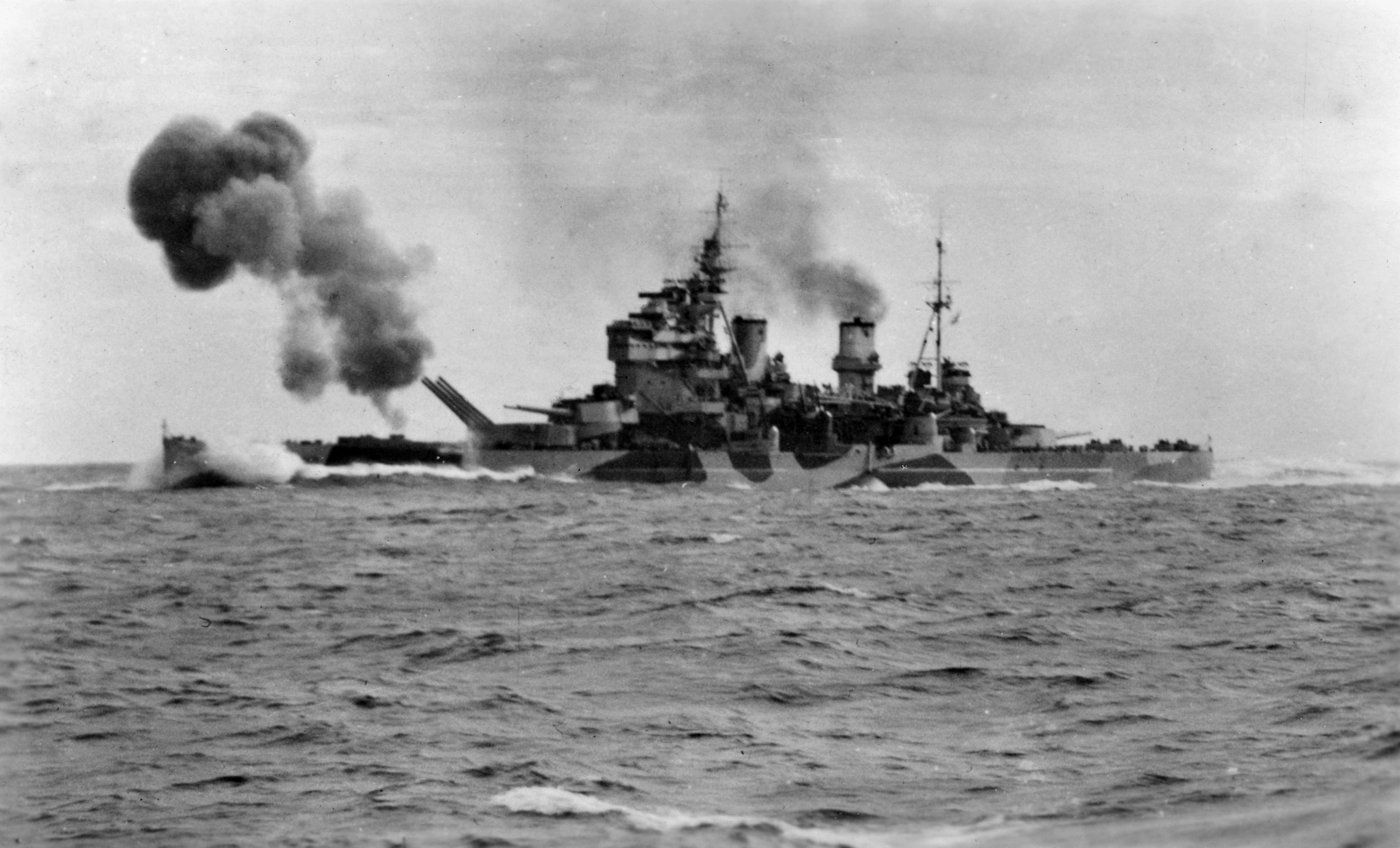
Anson is firing her guns during target practice in the North Sea.

In the aftermath of the First World War, the Washington Naval Treaty was drawn up in 1922 in an effort to stop an arms race developing between Britain, Japan, France, Italy, and the United States. This treaty limited the number of ships each nation was allowed to build and capped the displacement of all capital ships at 35,000 long tons. These restrictions were extended in 1930 through the London Naval Treaty, but in 1935, Japan and Italy would not agree to the Second London Naval Treaty for further armament control.

Concerned by a lack of modern battleships within their navy, the Admiralty ordered the construction of a new battleship class, the King George V class. The calibre limitation clause introduced in the Second Treaty meant that the main armament of the King George V class was limited to 14-inch (356 mm) and the unusual arrangement of the guns in the three turrets was an attempt to maximise firepower. Due to the pressing need for the ships, the British, unlike the US, could not delay to take advantage of an escalator clause that would allow 16-inch guns. The ships were the only ones to be built at the time to adhere to the treaty, and even though it soon became apparent to the British that the other signatories to the treaty were ignoring its requirements, it was too late to change the design of the class before they were laid down in 1937.

The keel of the fourth ship of the class was laid at the Swan Hunter and Wigham Richardson Shipyard on the River Tyne on 20 July 1937. She was originally to have been named Jellicoe, after Admiral Sir John Jellicoe, the commander of the Grand Fleet at the Battle of Jutland in 1916, but she was renamed Anson in February 1940. Anson was launched on 24 February 1940 and completed on 22 June 1942. Completion was delayed largely because of the inclusion of fire-control radar, and additional antiaircraft (AA) weapons.

== Description ==
Anson displaced 42,600 long tons (43,300 t) on trials in 1942 and 45,360 long tons (46,090 t) fully loaded in 1945. The ship had an overall length of 745 feet (227.1 m), a beam of 103 feet (31.4 m), and a draught of 31 feet 3 inches (9.5 m). Her designed metacentric height was 6 feet 1 inch (1.85 m) at normal load and 8 feet 1 inch (2.46 m) at deep load.

She was powered by Parsons geared steam turbines driving four propeller shafts. Steam was provided by eight Admiralty three-drum water-tube boilers, which normally delivered 100,000 shaft horsepower (75,000 kW), but could deliver 110,000 shp (82,000 kW) at emergency overload. (Note: The King George V-class battleships had their steam plant specifications revised during the building phase, and as built, the ships actually produced 110,000 shp (82,000 kW) at 230 rpm and were designed for an overload power of 125,000 shp (93,000 kW), which was exceeded in service.) This gave Anson a top speed of 27.62 knots (51.15 km/h; 31.78 mph). The ship carried 4,210 long tons (4,300 t) of fuel oil. At full speed, Anson had a range of 3,150 nautical miles (5,830 km; 3,620 mi) at 27 knots (50 km/h; 31 mph) while burning 36 long tons (37 t) of fuel per hour.

=== Armament ===
Anson's main armament was 10 BL 14-inch (356 mm) Mk VII guns. The 14-inch guns were mounted in three turrets; one Mark III quadruple turret forward and one aft, and one Mark II twin turret forward firing over the quadruple turret. The guns could be elevated 40° and depressed 3°. A full gun broadside weighed 15,950 pounds (7.23 t), and a salvo could be fired every 40 seconds. Her secondary armament consisted of 16 QF 5.25-inch (133 mm) Mk I guns, which were mounted in eight twin mounts. The maximum range of the Mk I guns was 24,070 yards (22,009.6 m) at a 45° elevation, the AA ceiling was 49,000 feet (14,935.2 m). The guns could be elevated to 70° and depressed to 5°. The normal rate of fire was 10 to 12 rounds per minute, but in practice, the guns could only fire seven to eight rounds per minute. Along with her main and secondary batteries, Anson carried six eight-barrelled QF 2-pounder Mk. VIII (40 mm) "pom-pom" AA guns. These were supplemented by 18 20-millimetre (0.8 in) Oerlikon light AA guns.

== Operational history ==
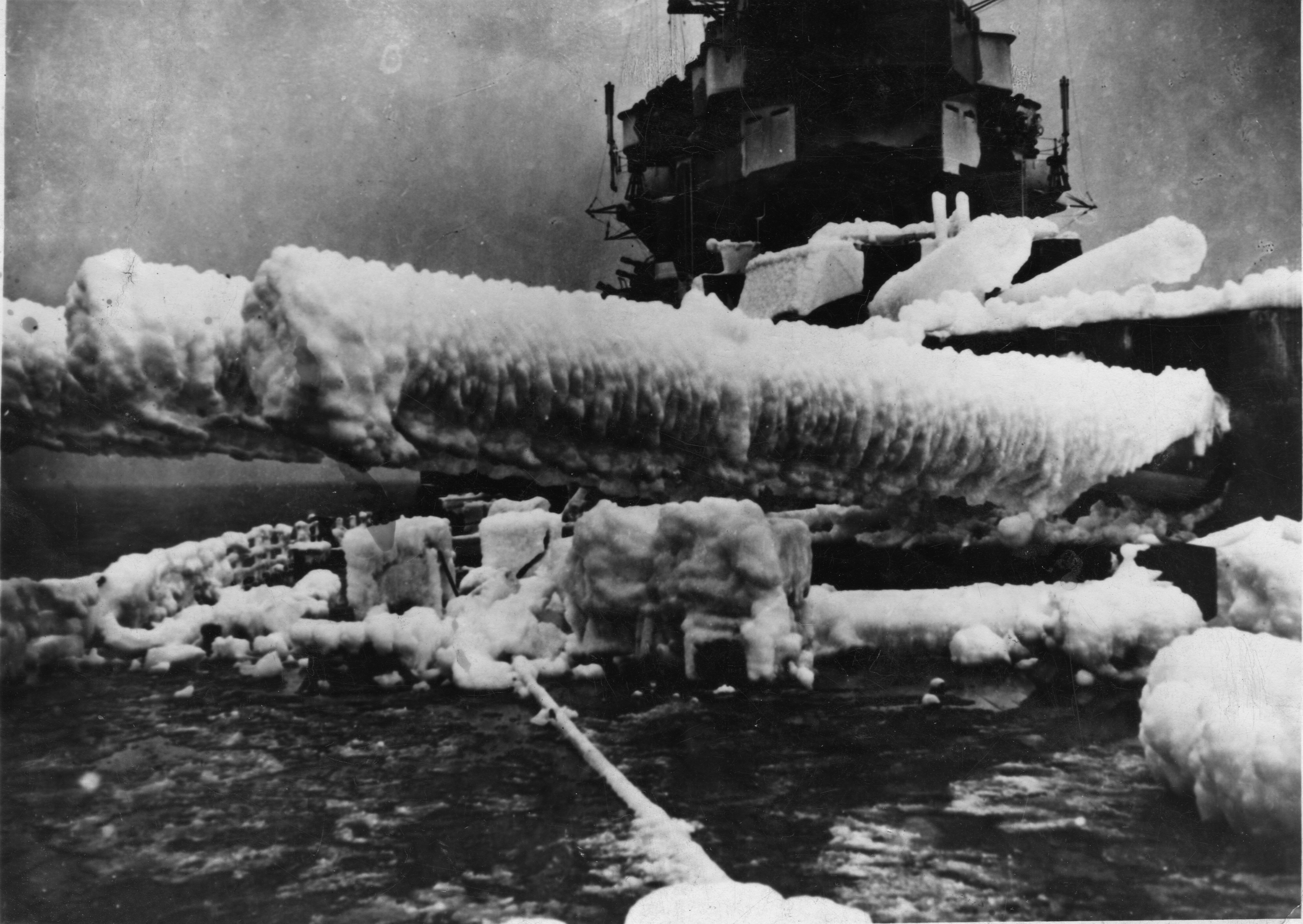
HMS Anson while on Russian convoy duty

After her commissioning in 1942, Anson was sent to the Arctic Sea with most of the Home Fleet as an escort ship for Russian convoys. On 12 September 1942, Anson was part of the distant covering force for Convoy QP 14, along with her sister ship HMS Duke of York, the light cruiser HMS Jamaica, and the destroyers HMS Keppel, Mackay, Montrose and Bramham. On 29 December Anson provided distant cover for Convoy JW 51B along with the cruiser HMS Cumberland and the destroyers HMS Forester, Icarus, and Impulsive. On 23 and 24 January 1943, Anson provided distant cover for Convoy JW 52 along with the cruiser HMS Sheffield and the destroyers HMS Echo, Eclipse, Faulknor, Inglefield, Montrose, Queenborough and Raider, and the Polish destroyer Orkan. On 29 January, Convoy RA 52 departed from the Kola inlet, with distant cover provided by Anson, the cruiser Sheffield, and the destroyers Inglefield, Oribi, and Obedient, and the Polish destroyer Orkan from 30 January.

In June 1942, the pre-First World War battleship HMS Centurion was disguised as Anson in the Mediterranean Sea, acting as a decoy during Operation Vigorous. In July 1943, Anson took part in moves designed to draw attention away from the preparations for Operation Husky, and in October that year, with Duke of York and the US cruiser Tuscaloosa, provided cover for Operation Leader, in which the US aircraft carrier Ranger mounted air strikes against German shipping off Norway. In February 1944, in company with the French battleship Richelieu and a force of cruisers and destroyers, Anson stood by in the same capacity while aircraft from the aircraft carrier HMS Furious carried out air strikes against German targets in Norway during Operation Bayleaf, and on 3 April, she provided cover for Operation Tungsten, a successful air strike against the German battleship Tirpitz, during which she served as flagship for Vice Admiral Sir Henry Moore.

Anson was decommissioned for a refit in June 1944 and did not return to the fleet until March 1945, when she sailed with Duke of York to join the British Pacific Fleet. By the time she arrived in the theatre, hostilities were all but over. She left Sydney on 15 August for Hong Kong with Duke of York, and along with a task force of other ships from Britain and the Commonwealth, accepted the surrender of the Japanese forces occupying Hong Kong. She was also present in Tokyo Bay during the official Japanese surrender aboard USS Missouri.

Anson is reported to have never once fired her main armament in anger.

=== Postwar era ===
Following the war, Anson was the flagship of the 1st Battle Squadron of the British Pacific Fleet and helped to liberate Hong Kong. After a brief refit, Anson sailed from Sydney to Hobart in February 1946 to collect the Duke and Duchess of Gloucester (the duke was then governor-general of Australia) and return them to Sydney.

Anson arrived back in British waters on 29 July 1946, and after a short refit, was returned to peacetime duties. In July 1949, she took part in Exercise Verity. In November 1949, Anson was placed in reserve, and in 1951, she was towed to Gare Loch. On 17 December 1957, she was purchased for scrap by Shipbreaking Industries, Faslane. A selection of her timbers were reused to make souvenirs of different types.

== Refits ==
During her career, Anson was refitted on several occasions to update her equipment. The following are the dates and details of the refits undertaken:

Dates	Location	Description of Work
Early 1943		22 × 20mm added.
July 1944 – March 1945	Devonport	2 × 8-barrelled 2-pounder, 4 × 4-barrelled 40mm Bofors guns, 8 × 2-barrelled 20mm, 13 × 20mm added. Type 273 radar deleted, Type 281 radar replaced by Type 281B, Type 282 replaced by Type 252 and two more Type 262 added, Type 284 replaced by 2 × Type 274, Type 285 replaced by Type 275; Type 277 and 293 added. RH2 VHF/DF, Type 651 jammer added; HA/LA Mk V directors replaced by HA/La Mk VI; aircraft and catapult equipment removed and ship's boats relocated.
Mid-1945		2 × twin 20mm replaced by 2 × 4-barrelled 2-pounder.
1946		4 × 2-barrelled, 2 × 8-barrelled 2-pounder removed.
