= Convoy SL 138/MKS 28 =

Convoys during naval battles of the Second World War

- Part of World War II
Date	27–31 October 1943
Location	Mid Atlantic
Result	British operational victory

Belligerents
United Kingdom	Germany

Commanders and leaders
Convoy Comm AM Hekking; Escort:Lt Cdr. F Ardern	Admiral Karl Dönitz

Strength
60 ships 14 escorts	8 U-boats

Casualties and losses
1 ship sunk	1 U-boat destroyed

Convoys SL 138/MKS 28 were two Allied convoys which ran during the Battle of the Atlantic in World War II. SL 138 was one of the SL convoys from the South Atlantic to Britain, and MKS 28 one of the MKS convoys between Britain and the Mediterranean. They were sailing together on the Gibraltar homeward route, having made a rendezvous off Gibraltar in order to cross the Bay of Biscay with the maximum possible escort. They were the subject of a major U-boat attack in October 1943, the first battle in the Kriegsmarine's renewed Autumn offensive.

== Background ==
Following the defeats of May 1943, and the devastating losses incurred by the U-boat Arm (U-Bootwaffe) (UBW) Adm Dönitz had withdrawn from attacks on the North Atlantic route while awaiting tactical and technical improvements. By September 1943 these were ready, and U-boat Control (Befehlshaber der Unterseeboote)(BdU) had re-opened the offensive in the North Atlantic. After several disastrous convoy battles, which had cost the U-boat Arm 32 U-boats destroyed for little gain (three escorts and two merchant ships sunk, and several others damaged) BdU had again withdrawn from the North Atlantic battleground. As had happened after Black May he again switched the focus of the campaign to the Mid-Atlantic and South Atlantic routes, reasoning these would be softer targets. To this end he established the "wolfpack" Schill off the coast of Portugal, to intercept convoys sailing to and from Gibraltar, Mediterranean and South Atlantic.

For the Allies, the success of Operation Torch and the re-opening of the Mediterranean to Allied traffic had led to the Allied convoy system in this area being re-organized. The previous OG/HG series to Gibraltar had been discontinued, to be replaced by the MKS/KMS series of ships to and from the Mediterranean. The OS/SL series to Freetown and the South Atlantic continued, but now the two routes were combined from Gibraltar; SL convoys from Freetown now making a rendezvous with MKS convoys from North African ports for the final leg of the journey to Britain. Similarly the OS and KMS convoys travelled together across the Bay of Biscay, before parting off Gibraltar.

== Protagonists ==
SL 138 left Freetown on 13 October 1943, arriving off Gibraltar on 24 October. It comprised 44 ships and was escorted by 39 Escort Group, of seven warships led by the frigate Tavy (Lt.Cdr. F Ardern). MKS 28 sailed from Alexandria on 14 October; and after losing SS Tivives torpedoed by German aircraft off Cape Ténès on 21 October, arrived off Gibraltar on 24 October to meet SL 138. The combined body of 60 ships escorted by a combined force of 12 warships then sailed for Britain.

The Schill patrol group initially comprised eight U-boats, but one of these, U-441 was attacked by Allied aircraft and forced to return. The seven boats that remained on station deployed in a patrol line west of Portugal, while aircraft of the Luftwaffe searched the ocean for any sign of the approaching convoys.

On 27 October 1943 a German reconnaissance aircraft sighted SL 138 and MKS 28 and reported their position.

== Action ==
SL 138/MKS 28 was sighted three days out from the Strait of Gibraltar by a German BV 222 reconnaissance aircraft, on 27 October 1943, in the ocean to the west of Lisbon, and following this the Schill boats began to gather for an attack.

On 29 October Francke in U-262 made contact and began to shadow the convoy; by evening he had been joined by two others, U-333 and U-306 and they commenced the attack. One ship was hit, the Norwegian freighter Hallfried, but all other attacks were driven off.

On 30 October the escort was joined by the destroyers Whitehall and Wrestler, which had been sent as reinforcement; during that day and the following night the Schill boats had no success.

On 31 October, as the convoy came within range of air cover from Britain, Whitehall and Geranium were able to catch U-306, which was destroyed by depth charges. With no further success after two days and nights of trying, and now with the loss of one of the Schill boats, the attack was called off and the wolf pack withdrew.

SL 138 and MKS 28 continued with no further incident and arrived at Liverpool on 5 November 1943.

== Aftermath ==
With just one ship sunk, for the loss of one U-boat and another damaged, the attack on SL 138/MKS 28 was hardly an auspicious start to BdU's renewed offensive. The Royal Navy, meanwhile, could take heart that the success they had achieved in the North Atlantic, with convoy after convoy making its "safe and timely arrival" could also be achieved on the Biscay route.
