= HMS Wanderer (D74) =

Destroyer of the Royal Navy

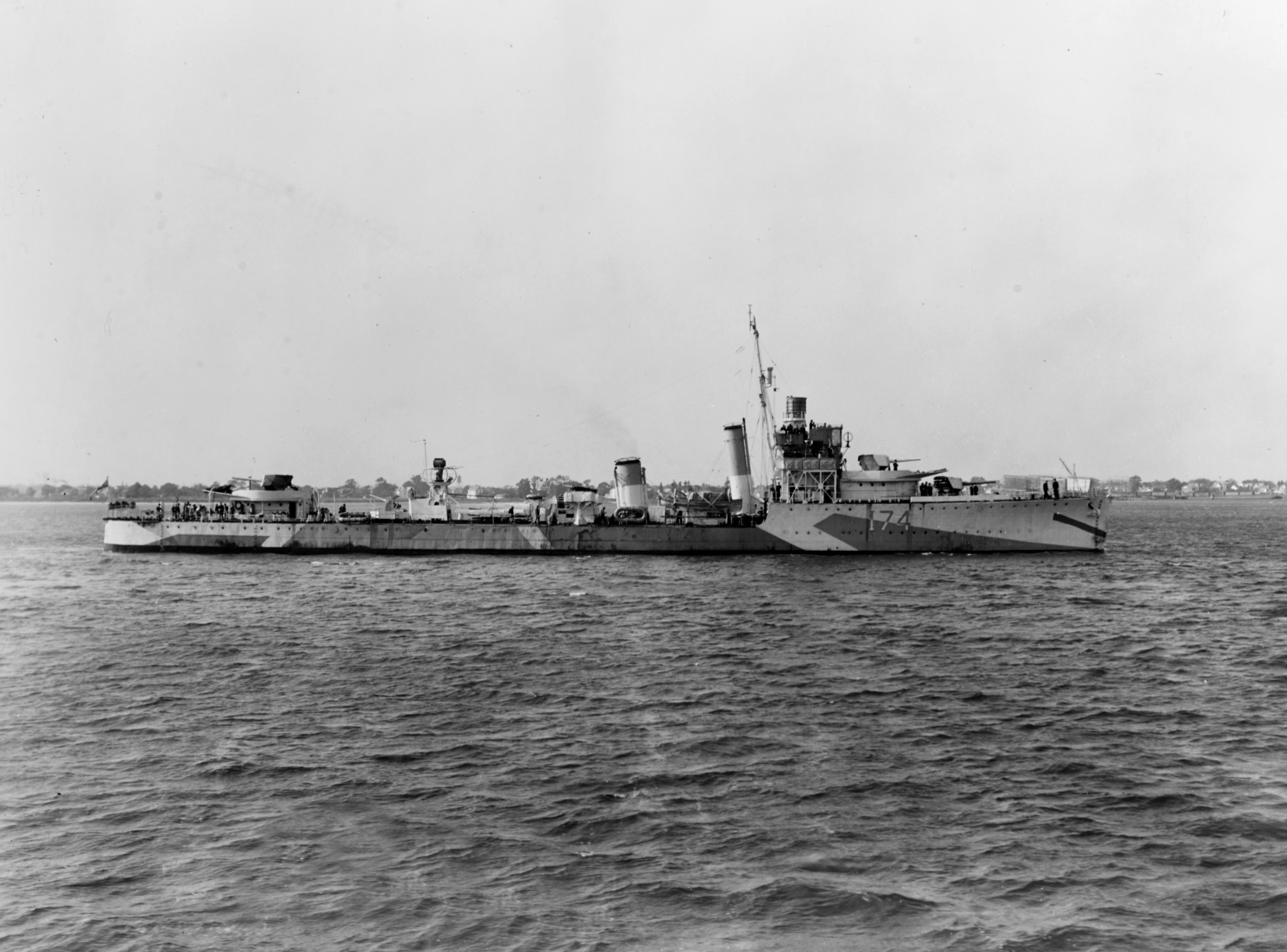
- HMS Wanderer in October 1942

History

United Kingdom
- Name: HMS Wanderer
- Ordered: January 1918
- Builder: Fairfield's of Glasgow
- Laid down: 7 August 1918
- Launched: 1 May 1919
- Commissioned: 18 September 1919
- Recommissioned: 1939
- In service: 1919-1945
- Out of service: 1945-1946
- Reclassified: 1943 Long Range Escort
- Motto: Vagantes numquam erramus; 'Wandering we never stray'
- Honours and awards: Atlantic (1939-45); Norway 1940; Sicily 1943; Normandy 1944; Arctic 1944; English Channel 1944
- Fate: Sold to be broken up for scrap on 31 January 1946
- Badge: Gold Bee on a Blue Field

General characteristics
- Class & type: Admiralty modified W class destroyer
- Displacement: 1,112 tons standard
- Length: 300 feet (91 m) o/a, 312 feet (95 m) p/p
- Beam: 29.6 feet (9.0 m)
- Draught: 11.7 feet (3.6 m) under full load
- Depth: 18.3 feet (5.6 m)
- Propulsion: As built 1919: 3 × Yarrow type Water-tube boilers, Brown-Curtis geared steam turbines, 2 shafts, 27,120 shp, 260 rpm; LRE conversion 1943; 2 × Yarrow type Water-tube boilers, Brown-Curtis geared steam turbines, 2 shafts, 18,000 shp
- Speed: 1919: 32 knots (59 km/h; 37 mph); 1943: 27.5 knots (50.9 km/h; 31.6 mph)
- Range: 320-370 tons oil; 3,500 nmi at 15 kn; 900 nmi at 32 kn
- Complement: 1919: 134; 1943: 193
- Sensors & processing systems: 1943 LRE conversion; Type 271 target indication radar; Type 291 air warning radar
- Armament: As built 1919: 4 × BL 4.7in (120mm) Mk.I guns on CP VI mounting; 2 × QF 2 pounder (40 mm) Mk.II guns; 1 × .303 inch Maxim gun; 4 × .303 inch Lewis Guns; 6 × 21-inch Torpedo Tubes (in 2 × triple mountings); 1 × Single Depth charge chute; 1943 LRE conversion: 2 × BL 4.7 in (120mm) Mk.I guns; 1 × .303 inch Lewis Gun; 4 × Twin Oerlikon 20 mm cannon's; 1 × Single Oerlikon 20 mm cannon; 2 × Double Depth charge throwers; 2 × Double Depth charge chutes; 1 × Hedgehog anti-submarine mortar (firing 24 × 32 pound spigot mounted bombs); March 1944: + 1 QF 2 pounder gun; + 1 single Oerlikon 20 mm cannon

HMS Wanderer (D74/I74) was an Admiralty modified W class destroyer built for the Royal Navy. She was the seventh RN ship to carry the name Wanderer. She was ordered in January 1918 to be built at the Fairfield Shipbuilding and Engineering Company, Govan in Glasgow, being launched in May 1919. She served through World War II where she was jointly credited with five kills on German U-boats, more than any other ship of her class. In December 1941 the community of Sutton Coldfield in Warwickshire officially adopted her. In 1943 she was one of twenty one V&W class destroyers to be converted as Long Range Escorts. She was decommissioned after the war and sold for scrap in 1946.

== Construction ==
HMS Wanderer's keel was laid down on 7 August 1918 at Fairfield's shipyard in Govan, Scotland. She was launched on 1 May 1919 and the build was completed on 18 August. The average cost for this class of ship was £262,478 which could be divided into hull cost of £104,726 (weighing 548 tons) and machinery cost of £109,308 (weighing 417 tons).

She was 312 feet overall in length with a beam of 29.5 feet. Her mean draught was 9 feet, and would reach 11.7 feet under full load. She had a displacement of 1,112 tons as standard.

She was propelled by three Yarrow type 250 pound per square inch water tube boilers, powering Brown-Curtis geared independent oil fuelled steam turbines developing 27,120 SHP and driving two screws at 260 RPM for a maximum designed speed of 34 knots. She was oil-fired and had a bunkerage of 320 to 350 tons. This gave a range of between 3500 nautical miles at 15 knots to 900 nautical miles at 32 knots.

She shipped four BL 4.7 in (120-mm) Mk.I guns on CP VI mountings in four single centre-line turrets. The turrets were disposed as two forward and two aft in super imposed firing positions. She also carried two QF 2 pounder Mk.II (40 mm L/39) ("Pom poms") mounted abeam between funnels and five Light machine guns (4 were Lewis guns and 1 was a Maxim). Abaft of the 2nd funnel, she carried six 21-inch Torpedo Tubes in two triple mountings on the centre-line.

== Inter war service ==
She was initially commissioned to the 3rd Flotilla, Atlantic Fleet on 18 September 1919 and later moved to the Mediterranean Fleet. Then in 1931 she was deployed at Chatham Naval Base as a training vessel. Shortly before the war broke out she was deployed with the 15th Destroyer Flotilla at Rosyth.

== Second World War service ==
=== 1939 ===
At the outbreak of WWII in September 1939 Wanderer was sent to Plymouth Navy Base to join the Western Approaches Command along with her flotilla (Vanity, Vansittart, Volunteer, Whitehall, Witch, Witherington and Wolverine), then on the 13th she was sent with HMS Whirlwind to escort convoy OB4 on its initial outward journey.

=== 1940 ===
On 7 January 1940 she arrived at Gibraltar together with HMS Aberdeen as escorts to convoy OG 13F (23 ships).

Convoy duties continued until 27 April 1940 when she was transferred to the Home Fleet to support the evacuation of Allied troops from Norway in Operation Alphabet. On 29 April along with five other destroyers (Somali, Mashona, Sikh, Walker and Westcott) and the light cruisers Sheffield, Arethusa and Galatea she took passage to Åndalsnes. During the operation Wanderer rescued 150 troops but became grounded and had to be towed free by HMS Sikh.

On 3 May her pendant number was changed to I74 as the Royal Navy were changing identities for all their ships in order to hopefully confuse the enemy.

Took part in Operation Cycle, the evacuation of Allied troops from Le Havre, France, on 6–7 June 1940.

In August with HMS Anthony rescued 55 survivors (between them) of the British merchantman Jamaica Pioneer.

=== 1941 ===
Whilst escorting to convoy OB 239 on 2 June 1941 along with the corvette HMS Periwinkle she attacked and sank the first of her five confirmed U-boat kills, U-147 to the west of Skerryvore at 56°38′N 10°24′W.

She was involved in the initial stages of Operation Substance in July 1941, escorting the convoy WS9C through the North West Approaches and in August she was escorting convoy SL 81 when it was spotted by the German submarine U-204 who called for support. When U-401 on her maiden patrol arrived they attacked together but Wanderer along with HNoMS St Albans and HMS Hydrangea managed to destroy U-401 at 50°27′N 19°50′W South-West of Ireland. SL 81 was harried for the next two days by submarine and air attacks with the loss of five ships, until it reached safer waters with RAF support.

On the evening of 18 August Wanderer was signalled by the C-in-C Western Approaches "Proceed OG 71 and carry out sweep astern of convoy for two hours before returning. Convoy is being shadowed by U boats". OG 71 was an outbound convoy to Gibraltar that was destined to have a hard time and in fact by the time Wanderer arrived the Norwegian destroyer HNoMS Bath had already been sunk by torpedoes, so Wanderer joined Hydrangea in rescuing 42 survivors (of which 2 later died aboard Hydrangea).

=== 1942 ===
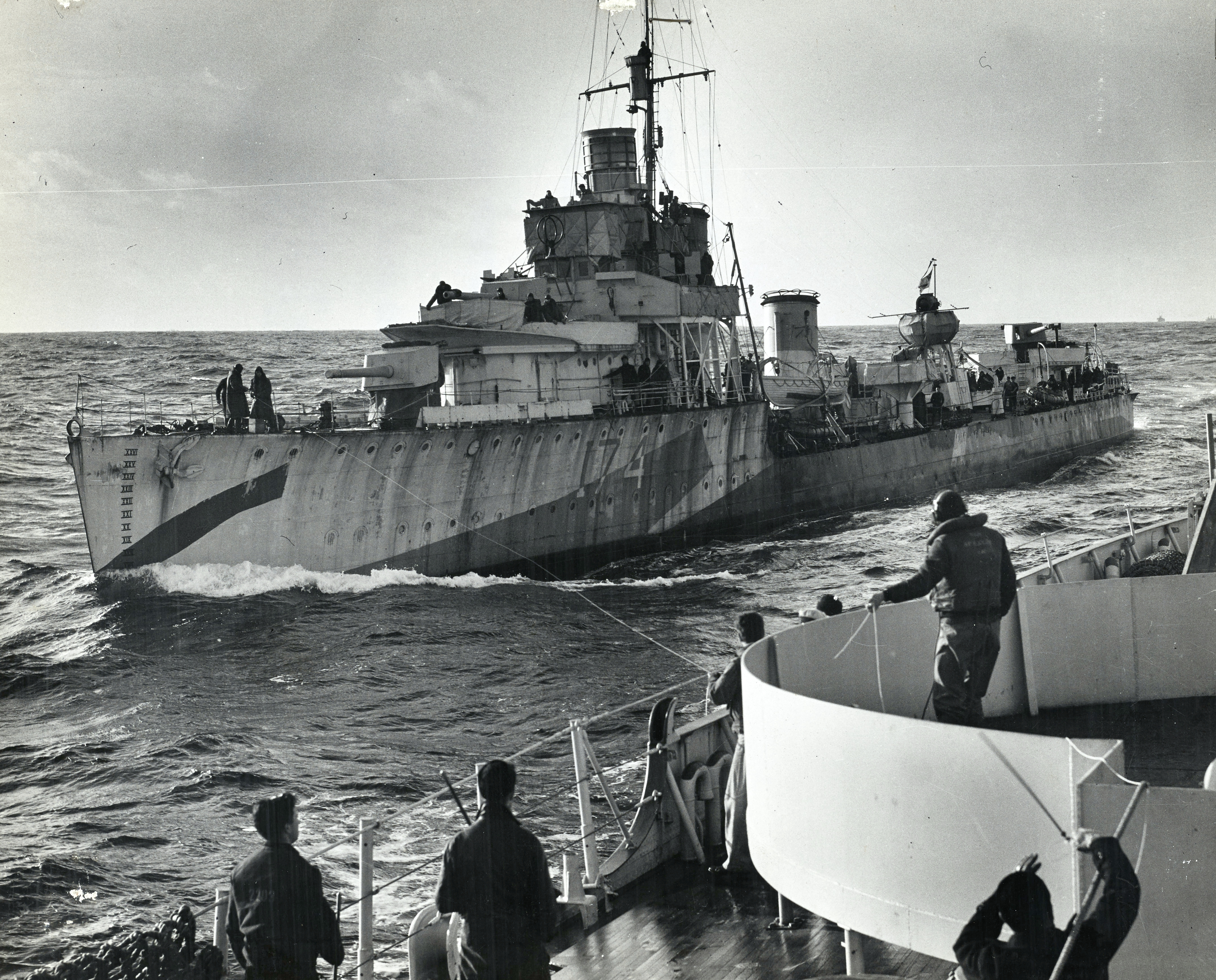
HMS Wanderer in the North Atlantic, before her 1943 refit

Escort duties continued in the Atlantic theatre and in September Wanderer entered the US Navy's Brooklyn shipyard for repairs or refit.

=== 1943 ===
==== LRE conversion ====
January to May 1943 was spent at HMNB Devonport under refit and conversion as a long range escort; the No.1 boiler (and her forward funnel) was removed to provide space for more fuel tanks and crew quarters; two of her main guns (A and Y) were landed and replaced with a Hedgehog ahead-throwing weapon forward and depth charge stowage and launchers aft; the torpedo tubes were replaced with depth charge stowage and a pair of Oerlikon 20 mm cannon amidships, with a further pair in the bridge wings; the 2-pounders were removed; her gunnery director tower and torpedo control were removed from the bridge to be replaced by an ASDICS control cabinet; she was fitted with Type 144 ASDICS (Sonar), Type 271 target indication radar and Type 291 air warning radar; the latest Wireless telegraphy (W/T), Radio transmitter (R/T) and High-frequency direction finding (H/F D/F) equipment was installed; and Carley rafts were fitted throughout.

The effect of removing the boiler was to reduce maximum speed to 27.5 knots, but the increase in fuel increased her range, and her crew complement was raised to 193.

==== Back in service ====
In July she began by escorting a convoy of troop ships for the Allied invasion of Sicily, known as Operation Husky. On 25 August, during a convoy from Britain to Gibraltar she came into radar contact with a surfaced U-523 at about 4.30am. When they closed to within 2,800 yards the U-boat submerged and they had to pick her up on sonar. They lost contact temporarily as the submarine headed underneath the convoy ships but they eventually picked her up again and with corvette HMS Wallflower began Hedgehog and depth charge runs. U-523 was forced to surface and the Allied ships turned their main armaments on them, forcing the Germans to abandon the submarine; 17 were lost but the other 37 were rescued and U-523 sank at 42°03′N 18°02′W. The following day Wanderer landed an advance Royal Air Force party in Portugal as part of Operation Alacrity, the occupation of leased air bases in the Azores.

Wanderer was deployed to the close escort group for Convoy JW 55B which was a part of the Russian convoys, sailing from Loch Ewe on 20 December when she had to rescue a young seaman that fell overboard; although they had him inboard with the doctor within seven minutes the cold killed him. The close escort group remained with the convoy well up into the Arctic Circle before they turned for home to refuel. A few days afterwards warships from JW 55B were involved in the Battle of the North Cape.

=== 1944 ===
On 17 January Wanderer was searching for a German blockade runner along with frigate Glenarm and the corvette Geranium when they detected a weak sonar contact to the south west of Cape Clear which turned out to be a U-boat. Together they carried out several Hedgehog attacks, with little effect, before Wanderer made a fast depth-charge barrage attack which sank the U-boat at 49°39′N 20°10′W. The U-boat was identified as U-305 but recent research suggests she may have been U-377.

During 22 to 27 February Wanderer accompanied aircraft carrier HMS Chaser on the Russian Convoy JW 57 which was attacked by U-boats with the loss of one destroyer. Wanderer then took passage with the rest of her Escort Group to the Faroe Islands to refuel but they were caught in a gale which three ships in the group registered as Force 12 on the Beaufort scale; as fuel was running low they were forced to continue and returned safely but with heavy weather damage.

Further modifications came in late March as she was fitted rather mysteriously with a single mounted 2 pounder gun on the Forecastle and another Oerlikon 20 mm cannon on the Quarterdeck.

In April she was transferred to the English Channel with Escort Group 105 in support of Operation Neptune, the landing operations in Normandy. On 28 May she escorted Motor Launch 10 on a mine laying operation off Brittany. Also that May she attacked a German E-boat in the channel, setting it on fire.

Between 4 and 6 June Escort Group 105 (Wanderer, HMS Tavy, HMS Dianella and HMS Geranium) and the Royal Canadian Navy corvettes Summerside, Woodstock and Regina escorted Convoy EBM2, composed of 30 motor transport ships and five others, from the Bristol Channel to the Western Task Force unloading area off Omaha Beach, arriving on D-day plus one.

On 5 July whilst escorting a convoy north off Pointe de Barfleur Wanderer detected U-390 and along with HMS Tavy began a Hedgehog attack which would lead to her fifth and final U-boat kill at 49°52′N 00°48′W. They rescued only one survivor, U-390's Engineer Officer, and were directed to land the prisoner at Portland.

== Fate ==
Whilst at Portland Wanderer's Engineering officer reported that the ship had "one hundred leaks from the sea and two hundred and fifty internal" and that due to steam the engineers couldn't see their way around the engine room while at sea. The ship's captain, Lt.Cdr. Reginald Whinney having questioned the engineer further then signaled the flag officer at Portland that he would not take the ship to sea again except for action against the enemy.

Whinney was then reassigned and his First Lieutenant was given command to sail Wanderer to Chatham Dockyard for assessment where it was confirmed that the twenty-five-year-old vessel was no longer seaworthy or even repairable.

In September 1945 Wanderer was put on the disposal list and was sold by 3 January 1946 to be demolished by ship breakers Hughes Bolckow.

== Battle honours ==
During her service Wanderer was awarded six battle honours

- Atlantic 1939-44
- Norway 1940
- Sicily 1943
- Normandy 1944
- Arctic 1944
- English Channel 1944

== Successes ==
During her service Wanderer was credited with the destruction of five U-boats

Date	U-boat	Type	Location	Notes
2 June 1941	U-147	IID	Atlantic, W of Skerryvore; 56°38′N 10°24′W	Depth-charged (d/c) and sunk by Wanderer, Periwinkle (OB 329)
3 August 1941	U-401	VIIC	Atlantic, SW of Ireland; 50°27′N 19°50′W	d/c and sunk by Wanderer, St Albans, and Hydrangea (SL 81)
25 August 1943	U-523	IXC	N Atlantic W of Vigo; 42°03′N 18°02′W	d/c, Hedgehog, and sunk by Wanderer (KMS 24)
17 January 1944	U-305	VIIC	N Atlantic SW of Cape Clear; 49°39′N 20°10′W	d/c and sunk by Wanderer and Geranium
5 July 1944	U-390	VIIC	English Channel, Seine Bay; 49°52′N 00°48′W	Hedgehog attack sunk by Wanderer, Tavy

== Bibliography ==
- Campbell, John (1985). Naval Weapons of World War II. Annapolis, Maryland: Naval Institute Press. ISBN 0-87021-459-4.
- Chesneau, Roger, ed. (1980). Conway's All the World's Fighting Ships 1922–1946. Greenwich, UK: Conway Maritime Press. ISBN 0-85177-146-7.
- Colledge, J. J.; Warlow, Ben (2006) [1969]. Ships of the Royal Navy: The Complete Record of All Fighting Ships of the Royal Navy from the 15th Century to the Present (3rd Rev ed.). London: Chatham Publishing. ISBN 978-1-86176-281-8. OCLC 67375475.
- Cocker, Maurice. Destroyers of the Royal Navy, 1893–1981. Ian Allan. ISBN 0-7110-1075-7.
- Edwards, Bernard (2009). The Cruel Sea Retold. South Yorkshire: Pen & Sword Military. ISBN 978-1-84415-863-8.
- Friedman, Norman (2009). British Destroyers From Earliest Days to the Second World War. Annapolis, Maryland: Naval Institute Press. ISBN 978-1-59114-081-8.
- Gardiner, Robert & Gray, Randal, eds. (1985). Conway's All the World's Fighting Ships 1906–1921. Annapolis, Maryland: Naval Institute Press. ISBN 0-85177-245-5.
- Lenton, H. T. (1998). British & Empire Warships of the Second World War. Annapolis, Maryland: Naval Institute Press. ISBN 1-55750-048-7.
- March, Edgar J. (1966). British Destroyers: A History of Development, 1892–1953; Drawn by Admiralty Permission From Official Records & Returns, Ships' Covers & Building Plans. London: Seeley Service. OCLC 164893555.
- Preston, Antony (1971). 'V & W' Class Destroyers 1917–1945. London: Macdonald. OCLC 464542895.
- Raven, Alan & Roberts, John (1979). 'V' and 'W' Class Destroyers. Man o'War. Vol. 2. London: Arms & Armour. ISBN 0-85368-233-X.
- Rohwer, Jürgen (2005). Chronology of the War at Sea 1939–1945: The Naval History of World War Two (Third Revised ed.). Annapolis, Maryland: Naval Institute Press. ISBN 1-59114-119-2.
- Whinney, Bob (2000). The U-boat Peril: A Fight for Survival. Cassell. ISBN 0-304-35132-6.
- Whitley, M. J. (1988). Destroyers of World War 2. Annapolis, Maryland: Naval Institute Press. ISBN 0-87021-326-1.
- Winser, John de D. (1999). B.E.F. Ships Before, At and After Dunkirk. Gravesend, Kent: World Ship Society. ISBN 0-905617-91-6.
