= Convoy RA 55B =

Arctic convoy in World War II

- Part of the Arctic Convoys of the Second World War
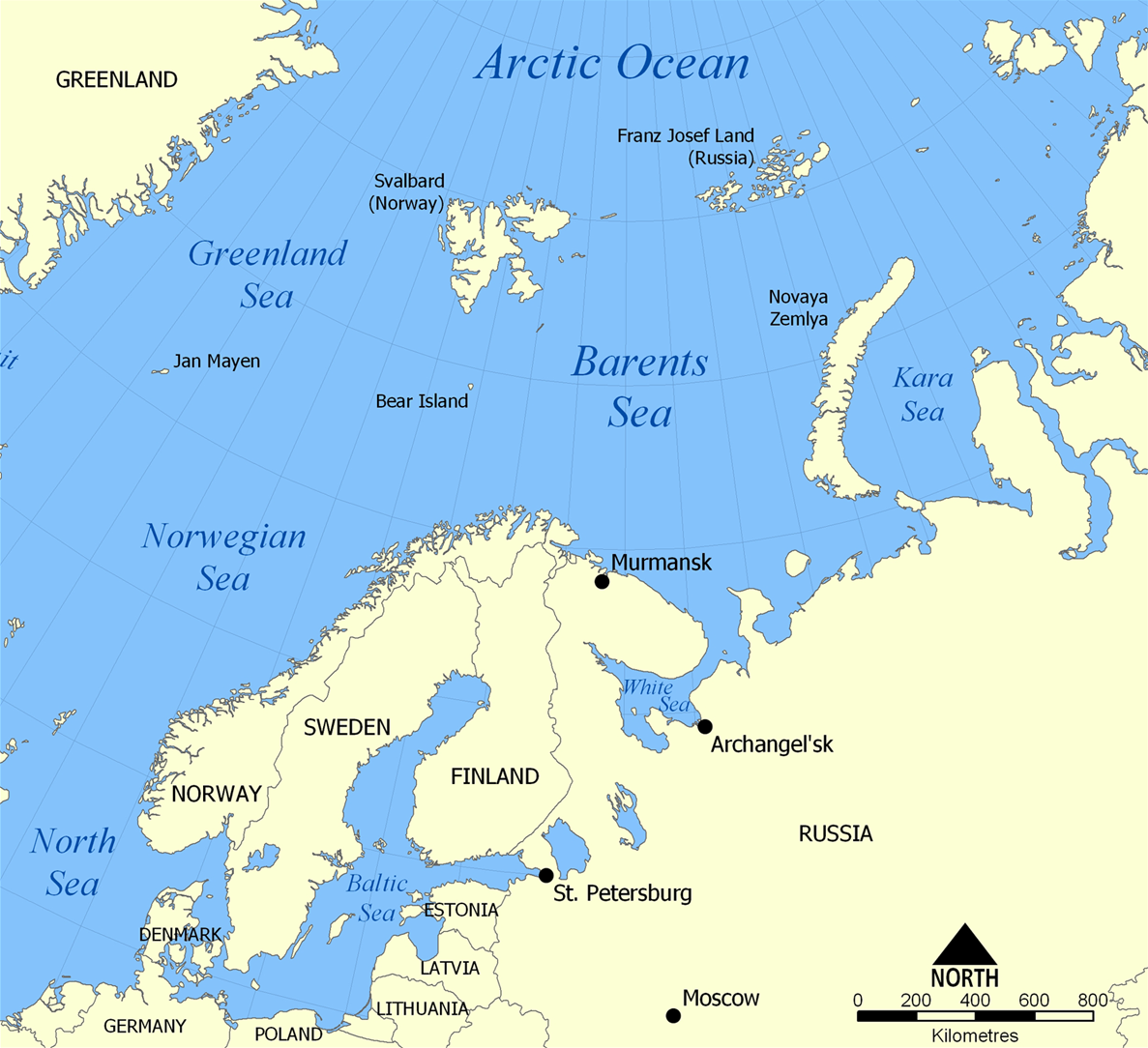
- The Barents and Norwegian and seas, site of the Arctic convoys
Date
Location
31 December 1943 − 8 January 1944
- Barents Sea
- Norwegian Sea

Convoy RA 55B (31 December 1943 − 8 January 1944) was an Arctic convoy during the Second World War. It was one of a series of convoys run to return Allied ships from Soviet northern ports to ports in Britain, the ships arrived safely.

== Forces ==
Convoy RA 55B consisted of eight merchant ships which departed from Kola Inlet on 31 December 1943. Close escort was provided by the two destroyers, Whitehall and Wrestler, and three corvettes. These were supported by an Ocean escort of eight Home Fleet destroyers led by HMS Onslow (Captain James McCoy commanding). Following the Battle of the North Cape on 26 December and the sinking of Scharnhorst, the threat from German surface units was, for the time being, eliminated and Convoy RA 55B dispensed with the usual distant cover by heavy units of the Home Fleet. RA 55A was threatened by a U-boat force of some thirteen boats, in gruppe Eisenbart, in the Norwegian Sea, which had operated against all the December convoys.

== Action ==
RA 55A sailed from Kola with its escort on 31 December 1943, accompanied by an eastern local escort of three minesweepers. On 1 January 1944 the local escort returned to Murmansk, leaving RA 55B to continue. German air reconnaissance was unable to find RA 55B in the gloom of the polar night, and although several Eisenbart boats made contact, their attacks were ineffectual. RA 55B was able to shake off pursuit and on 7 January met the western local escort of two minesweepers, which brought the convoy into Loch Ewe on the following day, 8 January 1944.

== Aftermath ==
The eight ships of RA 55B arrived in Britain without loss, the German attempts to attack the convoy having failed.

== Allied order of battle ==
=== Merchant ships ===
Ships convoyed (Note: Convoys had a standard formation of short columns, number 1 to port in the direction of travel. Each position in the column was numbered; position number 11 was the first ship in column 1, 12 was the second ship in the column; position number 21 was the first ship in column 2.)
Name	Year	Flag	GRT	No.	Notes
SS Daldorch	1930	Merchant Navy	5,571	41	Rear-commodore
SS Empire Stalwart	1943	Merchant Navy	7,050	11	
SS Fort Columbia	1942	Merchant Navy	7,181	12	
SS Fort Poplar	1942	Merchant Navy	7,134	21	Vice-commodore
SS James Gordon Bennet	1942	United States	7,176	42	
MV Lucerna	1930	Merchant Navy	6,556	22	Tanker
MV San Ambrosio	1935	Merchant Navy	7,410	32	Tanker
SS Thomas Kearns	1943	United States	7,184	31	Convoy commodore

=== Escorts ===
Escort (in relays)
Ship	Flag	Class	Notes
Eastern local escort
HMS Halcyon	Royal Navy	Halcyon-class minesweeper	31 December − 1 January 1944
HMS Hussar	Royal Navy	Halcyon-class minesweeper	31 December − 1 January 1944
HMS Speedwell	Royal Navy	Halcyon-class minesweeper	31 December − 1 January 1944
Ocean escort
HMCS Haida	Royal Navy	Tribal-class destroyer	1−7 January 1944
HMCS Huron	Royal Navy	Tribal-class destroyer	1−7 January 1944
HMCS Iroquois	Royal Navy	Tribal-class destroyer	1−7 January 1944
HMS Impulsive	Royal Navy	I-class destroyer	1−7 January 1944
HMS Onslow	Royal Navy	O-class destroyer	1−7 January 1944
HMS Onslaught	Royal Navy	O-class destroyer	1−7 January 1944
HMS Orwell	Royal Navy	O-class destroyer	1−7 January 1944
HMS Whitehall	Royal Navy	W-class destroyer	31 December − 8 January 1944
HMS Wrestler	Royal Navy	W-class destroyer	31 December − 8 January 1944
HMS Honeysuckle	Royal Navy	Flower-class corvette	31 December − 8 January 1944
HMS Oxlip	Royal Navy	Flower-class corvette	31 December − 8 January 1944
HMS Rhodedendron	Royal Navy	Flower-class corvette	31 December − 8 January 1944
HMS Gleaner	Royal Navy	Halcyon-class minesweeper	31 December − 8 January 1944
Western local escort
HMS Orestes	Royal Navy	Algerine-class minesweeper	7–8 January
HMS Ready	Royal Navy	Algerine-class minesweeper	7–8 January

== German order of battle ==
=== Kriegsmarine ===
U-boats
Name	Flag	Class	Notes
gruppe Eisenbart
U-277	Kriegsmarine	Type VIIC submarine	
U-314	Kriegsmarine	Type VIIC submarine	
U-354	Kriegsmarine	Type VIIC submarine	
U-387	Kriegsmarine	Type VIIC submarine	
U-601	Kriegsmarine	Type VIIC submarine	
U-716	Kriegsmarine	Type VIIC submarine	
U-957	Kriegsmarine	Type VIIC submarine	

== Bibliography ==
- Rohwer, Jürgen; Hümmelchen, Gerhard (2005) [1972]. Chronology of the War at Sea, 1939–1945: The Naval History of World War Two (3rd rev. ed.). London: Chatham. ISBN 978-1-86176-257-3.
- Ruegg, R.; Hague, A. (1993) [1992]. Convoys to Russia: Allied Convoys and Naval Surface Operations in Arctic Waters 1941–1945 (2nd rev. enl. ed.). Kendal: World Ship Society. ISBN 0-905617-66-5.
