= Whinnery =

Whinnery is a surname. Notable people with the surname include:

- Barbara Whinnery (born 1953), American actress
- John Roy Whinnery (1916–2009), American electrical engineer and educator

== See also ==
- Whinney
