= Whinney =

Whinney is a surname. Notable people with the surname include:

- Bob Whinney (1909–1992), Royal Navy officer
- Margaret Whinney (1897–1975), English art historian
- Michael Whinney (1930–2017), Church of England bishop
- Thomas Bostock Whinney (1860–1926), English architect
