= HMS Whitehall =

Destroyer of the Royal Navy

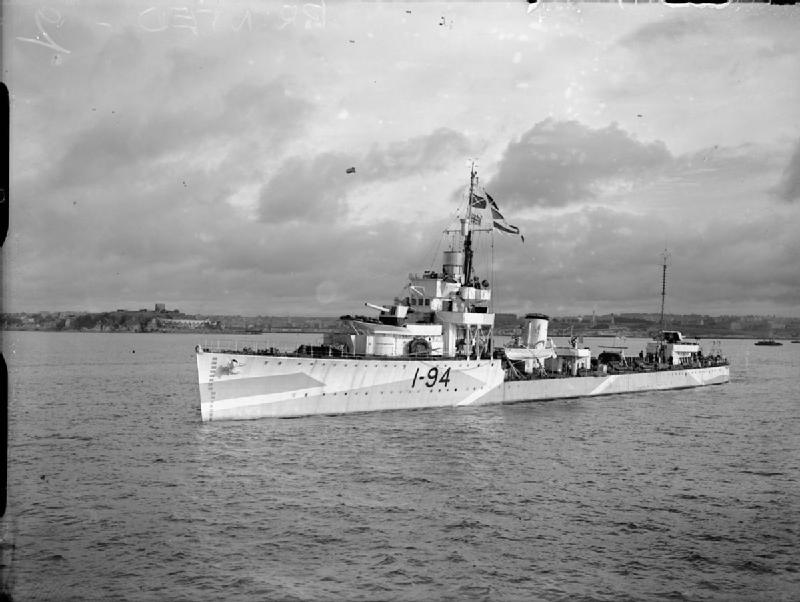
- HMS Whitehall underway in coastal waters during the Second World War sometime after her pennant number was changed from D94 to I94 in May 1940.

History

United Kingdom
- Name: HMS Whitehall
- Namesake: Whitehall
- Ordered: January 1918
- Builder: Swan Hunter, Wallsend, Newcastle upon Tyne, and Chatham Dockyard
- Laid down: June 1918
- Launched: 11 September 1919
- Completed: July 1924
- Commissioned: 9 July 1924
- Decommissioned: 1920s/1930s
- Recommissioned: August 1939
- Decommissioned: May 1945
- Motto: Nisi Dominici frustra ("Without my Lords [of the Admiralty] in vain")
- Honours and awards: Battle honours for: Atlantic 1939–1943; Dunkirk 1940; Arctic 1943–1945; Normandy 1944; English Channel 1944
- Fate: Sold for scrapping October 1945
- Badge: A gold fouled anchor on an escutcheon held by a silver winged seahorse, all on a blue field

General characteristics
- Class & type: Admiralty Modified W-class destroyer
- Displacement: 1,140 tons standard, 1,550 tons full
- Length: 300 ft (91 m) o/a, 312 ft (95 m) p/p
- Beam: 29 ft 6 in (8.99 m)
- Draught: 9 ft (2.7 m), 11 ft 3 in (3.43 m) under full load
- Propulsion: Yarrow type Water-tube boilers, Brown-Curtis geared steam turbines, 2 shafts, 27,000 shp
- Speed: 34 kn (63 km/h)
- Range: 320–370 tons oil; 3,500 nmi (6,500 km) at 15 kn (28 km/h); 900 nmi (1,700 km) at 32 kn (59 km/h)
- Complement: 127
- Sensors & processing systems: Type 286M Air Warning Radar fitted 1940; Type 271 Surface Warning Radar fitted 1940
- Armament: As built 1920: 4 × BL 4.7 in (120-mm) Mk.I guns, mount P Mk.I; 2 × QF 2 pdr Mk.II "pom-pom" (40 mm L/39); 6 × 21-inch (530 mm) torpedo tubes; 1940 SRE conversion: 3 × BL 4.7 in (120 mm) Mk.I L/45 guns; 1 × 3 in (76 mm) AA gun; 2 × QF 2 pdr Mk.II "pom-pom" (40 mm L/39); 3 × 21-inch Torpedo Tubes (one triple mount); 2 × depth charge racks; twin 6-pounder (57-mm) gun (1942 – replaced ‘A’ gun)

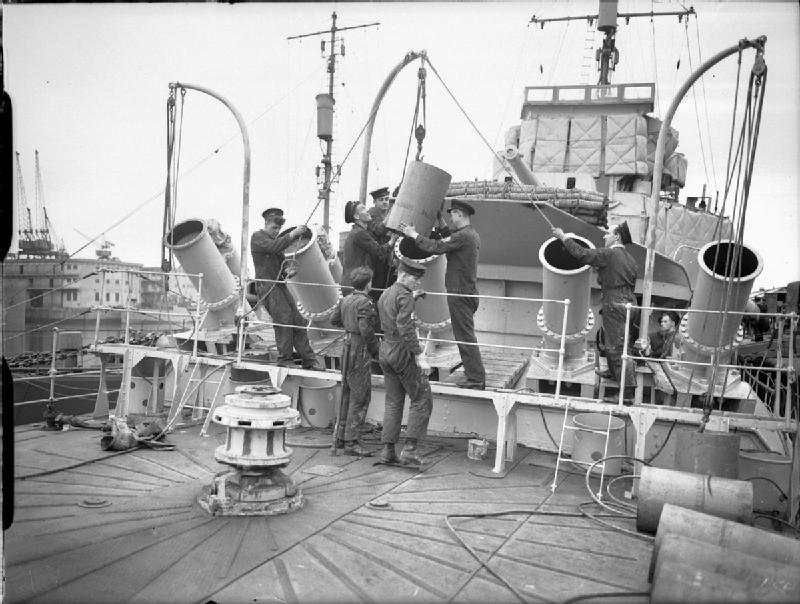
The unsuccessful Thornycroft five-barreled long-range depth charge projector during trials in July 1941 installed on the forecastle of HMS Whitehall.

HMS Whitehall, pennant number D94, later I94, was a Modified W-class destroyer of the British Royal Navy that saw service in the Second World War.

== Construction and commissioning ==
Whitehall, the first Royal Navy ship of the name, was ordered in January 1918 as part of the 13th Order of the 1918–1919 Naval Programme. She was laid down in June 1918 by Swan Hunter at Wallsend, Newcastle upon Tyne, and launched on 11 September 1919. Work was then suspended and she was towed to Chatham Dockyard, where her fitting-out finally was completed in July 1924. She was commissioned into service on 9 July 1924 with the pennant number D94.

== Service history ==
=== Before the Second World War ===
After entering service with the fleet in 1924, Whitehall saw limited operational use before being decommissioned for economic reasons, transferred to the Reserve Fleet, and placed in reserve.

In August 1939, Whitehall was recommissioned with a reserve crew for the Royal Review of the Reserve Fleet in Weymouth Bay by King George VI. She then remained in commission as the fleet mobilised because of deteriorating diplomatic relations between the United Kingdom and Nazi Germany, and received orders to proceed to Rosyth, Scotland, in the event of war and report for duty there with the 15th Destroyer Flotilla.

=== Second World War ===
==== 1939 ====
After the United Kingdom entered the Second World War on 3 September 1939, Whitehall took aboard stores and her wartime complement and proceeded to Rosyth for her assignment with the 15th Destroyer Flotilla. Upon arrival, she took up convoy escort and patrol duties in the North Sea, which she continued through November 1939. In December 1939 she was transferred to Western Approaches Command for convoy defence operations in the Southwestern Approaches. On 28 December 1939, she joined the destroyers Vanoc, Whirlwind, and Wivern as the escort for the Gibraltar-bound Convoy OG 21 as it formed in the Southwestern Approaches; the British destroyers remained with the convoy during the initial leg of its voyage, detaching on 29 December to return to base after being relieved by two French Navy warships.

==== 1940 ====
In January 1940, Whitehall proceeded to Gibraltar where on 21 January she set out for the United Kingdom as the escort for Liverpool-bound Convoy HG 16F along with Vanoc and the destroyer Active, reinforced the following day by the sloop Aberdeen. The three destroyers detached from the convoy on 28 January and returned to base in the United Kingdom. On 23 March, Whitehall joined the destroyers Wakeful and Winchelsea in relieving two French warships in the Southwestern Approaches as the escort of the Gibraltar-to-Liverpool Convoy HG 23F, remaining with the convoy until its arrival at Liverpool on 26 March. On 5 May 1940, Whitehall, the sloop Rochester, and two French warships joined Convoy OG 28 as it formed in the Southwestern Approaches for its passage to Gibraltar; she and Rochester detached from the convoy later in the day to return to base. Whitehall's pennant number was changed to I94 during May 1940.

The highly successful German invasion of France, Luxembourg, Belgium, and the Netherlands began on 10 May 1940, and on 20 May Whitehall was assigned to the support of operations ashore as Allied forces retreated before the German offensive and required evacuation to the United Kingdom. On 26 May, she was assigned to Operation Dynamo, the evacuation of Allied troops from Dunkirk, France. She made two evacuation trips on 30 May, carrying 655 troops from Dunkirk to Dover on the first voyage and another 593 on the second. On 31 May, she joined Winchelsea and the destroyer Venomous in an evacuation run to Dunkirk and carried another 943 troops to Dover. On 1 June, after German aircraft sank the destroyer Basilisk in shallow water at La Panne, Belgium, Whitehall joined the fishing trawler Jolie Mascotte in rescuing 131 members of Basilisk's crew, destroyed the wreck of Basilisk with gunfire, and then, after suffering damage in a German air attack, landed 571 personnel – a mix of evacuated troops and Basilisk survivors – at Dover, bringing to 2,762 the number of personnel she evacuated during Dynamo. The ship was depicted in the Dover scene of the 1958 movie 'Dunkirk', starring John Mills.

After Dynamo, Whitehall was under repair at Plymouth until 26 August 1940. With her repairs complete, she transferred to Harwich to conduct patrols and convoy defence operations in the North Sea. In September 1940, she was transferred to Western Approaches Command for convoy escort duties in the Western Approaches as a part of the 8th Escort Group based at Liverpool. She joined the destroyer Sturdy, the minesweeper Jason, the corvettes Arabis, Coreopsis, Heliotrope, and Hibiscus, and three naval trawlers as the escort of Convoy HX 79 on 18 October 1940; the convoy came under sustained attack by five German submarines, which sank 12 of its merchant ships and damaged another without loss to themselves.

Whitehall continued on convoy escort duty in the North Atlantic for the rest of 1940 without major incident.

==== 1941 ====
After spending the first half of 1941 on North Atlantic convoy duty without any significant incidents, Whitehall was selected in June 1941 to carry out trials of a new weapon, the Five Wide Virgins, a mortar designed by John I. Thornycroft & Company to fire depth charges ahead of a ship attacking an enemy submarine. Whitehall conducted the trials during July 1941, and the weapon was unsuccessful, although a later antisubmarine mortar designed by the Admiralty, Hedgehog, would become an important Allied antisubmarine weapon.

After completion of the antisubmarine mortar trials, Whitehall returned to North Atlantic convoy duty. On 2 August 1941, she deployed with Winchelsea, Witch, the heavy cruiser London, the destroyers Broadway, Gurkha, Lance, and Legion, the Polish Navy destroyer ORP Piorun, and the Royal Netherlands Navy destroyer HNLMS Isaac Sweers from the River Clyde in Scotland as escort for Convoy WS 9C, all but London detaching from the convoy on 5 August to return to the Clyde. On 9 August she escorted the military convoy WS 8C from the Clyde to Scapa Flow as part of the build-up for a planned occupation of the Azores that later was cancelled, returning to the Clyde on 10 August. She joined Witch and the Royal Netherlands Navy light cruiser HNLMS Jacob van Heemskerck in escorting Convoy WS 10X from Liverpool to the Clyde on 15 August 1941.

From 17 to 24 September 1941, Whitehall, Witch, Isaac Sweers, Piorun, the destroyers Laforey, Lightning, and Oribi, the Polish Navy destroyer ORP Garland, and the escort destroyer Blankney escorted WS 11X from the Clyde during its passage of the Northwestern Approaches bound for Gibraltar and Operation Halberd, a major effort to relieve Malta, then under siege by Axis forces; the destroyers detached to return to the Clyde while the battleship Prince of Wales and light cruisers Euryalus and Kenya covered the convoy during its Atlantic passage. From 1 to 4 October 1941, Whitehall, Witch, the light cruiser Cairo, and the destroyer Verity escorted military convoy WS 12 during its passage of the Northwestern Approaches, detaching along with the other escorts to return to the Clyde. From 13 to 18 November 1941, she joined Witch, the destroyers Maori and Vanquisher, and the escort destroyers Badsworth and Exmoor as local escort of the military convoy as it departed the Clyde and transited the Northwestern Approaches, detaching to return to the Clyde; the battleship Royal Sovereign provided the ocean escort for the convoy.

==== 1942 ====
Whitehall remained on North Atlantic convoy duty until February 1942, when she was transferred to the Mediterranean. She arrived at Gibraltar on 27 February to take part in Operation Spotter I, an aircraft delivery run to Malta that was cancelled due to aircraft fuel problems. On 6 March 1942, Whitehall, Laforey, Lightning, Blankney, the destroyers Active Anthony, and Wishart, and the escort destroyers Croome and Duncan set out from Gibraltar as the escort of the aircraft carriers Argus and Eagle and the battleship Malaya for Operation Spotter II, another aircraft delivery to Malta. On 20 March, Whitehall, Active, Anthony, Blankney, Croome, Duncan, Exmoor, Laforey, and Wishart again departed Gibraltar as escort for Argus and Eagle as the two carriers again delivered aircraft to Malta in Operation Picket I. On 27 March, the same ships began Operation Picket II to deliver aircraft to Malta yet again.

In April 1942, Whitehall returned to the United Kingdom to rejoin her escort group, and was selected for conversion into a Long-Range Escort. In May 1942, she entered the Royal Navy Dockyard at Sheerness to undergo a refit and begin the conversion, which included the installation of a Type 271 surface warning radar and a Type 286P air warning radar. After the completion of her post-conversion acceptance trials and pre-deployment work-ups, she rejoined her escort group in August 1942. On 30 September 1942, she was detached from the group to escort the 1st Minelaying Squadron while it laid mines in the Northern Barrage, and in October 1942 she transferred to the 2nd Escort Group to continue North Atlantic convoy defence operations. Later that month, she joined the destroyers Hesperus and Vanessa in escorting Convoy ONS 138 on a transatlantic voyage from Liverpool to Halifax, Nova Scotia, Canada; the convoy avoided attack by German submarines by exploiting radio direction-finding information to alter course around them. In November 1942, Whitehall returned to the United Kingdom as part of the escort for a convoy making the reverse trip.

During 1942, Whitehall was "adopted" by the civil community of Cheltenham, Gloucestershire, in a Warship Week national savings campaign.

==== 1943 ====
===== Atlantic Convoys =====
Whitehall continued on Atlantic convoy duty without major incident until April 1943, when she joined Hesperus, Vanessa, corvettes of her escort group, and the 5th Support Group – consisting of the escort aircraft carrier Biter and four destroyers – in escorting Convoy ONS 4. The convoy came under attack by German submarines of Wolfpack Meise. Hesperus sank the submarine U-191, and the escorts damaged other submarines; Whitehall and the corvette Campanula pursued a radio direction-finding fix on U-732 on 23 April, but were unable to attack because U-732 dived to avoid attack by aircraft from Biter before their arrival on the scene. In May 1943, Whitehall, Hesperus, and ships of the 2nd Escort Group were among eight escorts of the 25-ship Convoy SC 129, which came under attack by 21 German submarines of Wolfpack Elbe on 11 May. The submarines sank two of the convoy's merchant ships that day, and Whitehall, Hesperus, and the corvette Clematis joined forces to drive off U-359 and U-383. Hesperus damaged U-223 and sank U-186 on 11–12 May, while Whitehall pursued two radio direction-finding contacts on the afternoon of 12 May, attacking one submarine with depth charges and another with gunfire and depth charges without sinking them. German attacks ceased on 13 May after Biter arrived to provide air cover.

In October 1943, Whitehall participated in Operation Alacrity, the establishment of air and refuelling bases in the Azores, escorting convoys carrying men, equipment, and supplies to the islands. Later in the month, she returned to convoy escort duty, taking part in the escort of the combined convoys MKS 28 and SL 138. On 31 October, while the convoys were under attack by German submarines of Wolfpack Schill, a radio direction-finding fix on U-306 allowed Whitehall and the corvette Geranium to depth-charge U-306 and sink her in the North Atlantic northeast of the Azores at 46°19′00″N 020°44′00″W with the loss of her entire crew of 51.

===== Arctic Convoys =====
In November 1943, Whitehall was reassigned to the escort of Arctic convoys between the United Kingdom and the Soviet Union. On 15 November, Whitehall, the destroyer Inconstant, the corvette Heather, and the minesweeper Hussar set out from Loch Ewe, Scotland, as the escort of Convoy JW 54A during its passage to the Kola Inlet in North Russia, where it arrived without incident on 24 November. She and the same ships escorted Convoy RA 54B from the Kola Inlet to Loch Ewe between 27 November and 9 December 1943 in another uneventful passage. On 20 December 1943, she set out from Loch Ewe with the destroyer HMS Wrestler, the corvettes Honeysuckle and Oxlip, and the minesweeper Gleaner as the escort for Convoy JW 55B; after the German battleship Scharnhorst put to sea to threaten the convoy, destroyers of the Home Fleet joined the escort on 25 December. Heavy units of the Home Fleet sank Scharnhorst in the Battle of the North Cape on 26 December 1943, and JW 55B arrived at the Kola Inlet on 30 December without losing any ships. On 31 December, Whitehall, Wrestler, Honeysuckle, Oxlip, and the corvette Rhododendron departed the Kola Inlet as the escort for Convoy RA 55B.

==== 1944 ====
U-boats of Wolfpack Eisenbart detected Convoy RA 55B and attacked it in early January 1944. All of the attacks were ineffective; Whitehall and her fellow escorts delivered the eight merchant ships of the convoy to Loch Ewe without loss on 8 January 1944.

On 22 January 1944, Whitehall, Oxlip, the destroyer Westcott, the sloop Cygnet, and the minesweeper Seagull departed Loch Ewe escorting Convoy JW 56B to the Soviet Union. Six U-boats of Wolfpack Werewolf attacked on 30 January, sinking the destroyer Hardy but failing to press home attacks against the convoy. Whitehall and the destroyer Meteor depth-charged and sank U-314 that day in the Barents Sea south-east of Bear Island at 73°41′00″N 024°30′00″E with the loss of all the crew of 49. Whitehall detached from the convoy upon arrival at the Kola Inlet on 1 February 1944. On 3 February, she departed the Kola Inlet with Cygnet, Hussar, Oxlip, Rhododendron and Westcott, the corvettes HMS Dianella and Poppy, and the minesweepers HMS Halcyon and Speedwell as the escort for Convoy RA 56, which made an uneventful passage to Loch Ewe, arriving on 11 February 1944.

After arriving at Loch Ewe, Whitehall was transferred to North Atlantic convoys but in March 1944 she once again was selected for Arctic convoy work. On 27 March 1944, she joined Honeysuckle, Westcott, Wrestler, and the corvettes HMS Bluebell and Lotus as the escort for Convoy JW 58, departing Loch Ewe that day. The escort later was reinforced by two escort aircraft carriers, the light cruiser Diadem, and destroyers of the Home Fleet and the escort carrier HMS Trackersurface ships combined to sink four German submarines after they began attempts to attack the convoy on 29 March. Convoy JW 58 arrived at the Kola Inlet on 4 April 1944. On 7 April, Whitehall departed the Kola Inlet with Inconstant, Westcott, Wrestler, the escort aircraft carrier HMS Activity, and the destroyers Beagle, Boadicea, Keppel, Venus, and Walker as the escort of Convoy RA 58, detaching at sea on 12 April before the convoy arrived at Loch Ewe.

On 20 April 1944, Whitehall got underway for the Kola Inlet to take aboard Soviet Navy personnel slated to man warships in Britan scheduled for transfer to the Soviet Union and to escort empty Allied ships to Britain. During the passage, she was part of a force of 15 destroyers and Royal Canadian Navy frigates screening Activity, Diadem, and the escort aircraft carrier HMS Fencer. The ships arrived at the Kola Inlet on 23 April, and Whitehall embarked 14 passengers before the force got underway again as the escort for Convoy RA 59 on 28 April. On 3 May, Whitehall, Boadicea, Diadem, Fencer, Walker, and the destroyers HMS Ulysses, Verulam and Virago detached from the force and proceeded independently to Britain.

Upon arrival in the United Kingdom, Whitehall was transferred to North Atlantic convoy escort but later in May 1944 was selected to participate in Operation Neptune, the assault phase of the Allied Invasion of Normandy, scheduled for early June 1944. She joined Rhododendron and the naval trawlers HMS Scoma and Ulva at Milford Haven, Wales, to form Escort Group 139. The escort group escorted Convoy EBC 1, made up of loaded stores coasters, from Milford Haven to the Isle of Wight on 3 June, then to the Solent on 5 June. On 7 June, the second day of the invasion, EBC 1 and its escort group proceeded to the invasion beaches. On 9 June, Whitehall's escort group was back at Milford Haven, and then began a cycle of escorting convoys carrying reinforcements and supplies to the beachheads until released from Operation Neptune on 27 June 1944.

Upon her release from Neptune, Whitehall was sent back to the Arctic. On 15 August 1944, she departed Britain as part of the close escort for Convoy JW 59 with Bluebell, Cygnet, Honeysuckle, Oxlip, the frigate HMS Loch Dunvegan and the corvettes HMS Camellia and Charlock. The passage was marred by the loss of the sloop Kite, which sank in one minute on 21 August after suffering two torpedo hits but the convoy arrived at the Kola Inlet on 24 August. On 28 August, Whitehall, Keppel, Loch Dunvegan, and the sloops HMS Mermaid and Peacock departed the Kola Inlet as the close escort for Convoy RA 59A; on 30 August, Whitehall rescued the survivors of the American merchant ship SS William S. Thayer, that had been sunk by U-771. On 2 September 1944, she shared credit with Keppel, Mermaid, Peacock, and a Fairey Swordfish aircraft of Fleet Air Arm 825 Naval Air Squadron from the escort aircraft carrier HMS Vindex for the sinking of U-394 in the Norwegian Sea south-east of Jan Mayen at 69°47′00″N 004°10′00″E with the loss of her crew of 50. Whitehall detached from the convoy upon its arrival at Loch Ewe without the loss of a merchant ship on 5 September 1944.

From 15 to 23 September 1944, Whitehall, Cygnet, Keppel, the destroyer HMS Bulldog, and the corvettes HMS Allington Castle and Bamborough Castle escorted Convoy JW 60 from the United Kingdom to the Kola Inlet without interference by German forces. The same ships escorted Convoy RA 60 on its voyage from the Kola Inlet to Loch Ewe between 28 September and 5 October 1944, losing two merchant ships to a German submarine attack on 29 September. Whitehall was transferred to North Atlantic convoys on 7 October 1944. She carried out these duties through the end of 1944 and into early 1945 without major incident.

==== 1945 ====
After beginning 1945 on North Atlantic convoy duty, Whitehall was selected later in January 1945 to return to the Arctic convoy run. On 2 February 1945, she got underway from the Clyde with Bamborough Castle, Bluebell, Cygnet, Rhododendron, the sloop Lark, and the corvette Alnwick Castle as the close escort for Convoy JW 64. She and Lark repelled a torpedo attack by German aircraft on 10 February, and the convoy arrived at the Kola Inlet on 15 February. On 16 February, Whitehall took part in antisubmarine operations off the Kola Inlet to clear the way for the next departing convoy, Convoy RA 64, then joined the same ships that had escorted JW 64 to escort RA 64 to the United Kingdom. The convoy departed the Kola Inlet on 17 February, and that morning a German acoustic torpedo badly damaged Lark and forced her to return under tow to the Kola Inlet, but the other ships pressed on for the United Kingdom. Whitehall was forced to leave the convoy on 21 February because of boiler problems and proceed independently.

After the completion of repairs in March 1945, Whitehall was assigned to escort duty in the waters around Great Britain, which she continued until the surrender of Germany in early May 1945.

== Decommissioning and disposal ==
Whitehall was decommissioned and placed in reserve in May 1945, and by July 1945 she no longer appeared on the Royal Navy's active list. Placed on the disposal list after the 15 August 1945 surrender of Japan, she was sold in October 1945 to the British Iron & Steel Corporation (BISCO), which allocated her for scrapping to Thos. W. Ward. She arrived at Ward's yard at Barrow-in-Furness on 27 October 1945.

== Bibliography ==
- Campbell, John (1985). Naval Weapons of World War II. Annapolis, Maryland: Naval Institute Press. ISBN 0-87021-459-4.
- Chesneau, Roger, ed. (1980). Conway's All the World's Fighting Ships 1922–1946. Greenwich, UK: Conway Maritime Press. ISBN 0-85177-146-7.
- Colledge, J. J.; Warlow, Ben (2006) [1969]. Ships of the Royal Navy: The Complete Record of All Fighting Ships of the Royal Navy from the 15th Century to the Present (3rd Rev ed.). London: Chatham Publishing. ISBN 978-1-86176-281-8. OCLC 67375475.
- Cocker, Maurice. Destroyers of the Royal Navy, 1893–1981. Ian Allan. ISBN 0-7110-1075-7.
- Friedman, Norman (2009). British Destroyers From Earliest Days to the Second World War. Annapolis, Maryland: Naval Institute Press. ISBN 978-1-59114-081-8.
- Gardiner, Robert & Gray, Randal, eds. (1985). Conway's All the World's Fighting Ships 1906–1921. Annapolis, Maryland: Naval Institute Press. ISBN 0-85177-245-5.
- Lenton, H. T. (1998). British & Empire Warships of the Second World War. Annapolis, Maryland: Naval Institute Press. ISBN 1-55750-048-7.
- March, Edgar J. (1966). British Destroyers: A History of Development, 1892–1953; Drawn by Admiralty Permission From Official Records & Returns, Ships' Covers & Building Plans. London: Seeley Service. OCLC 164893555.
- Preston, Antony (1971). 'V & W' Class Destroyers 1917–1945. London: Macdonald. OCLC 464542895.
- Raven, Alan & Roberts, John (1979). 'V' and 'W' Class Destroyers. Man o'War. Vol. 2. London: Arms & Armour. ISBN 0-85368-233-X.
- Rohwer, Jürgen (2005). Chronology of the War at Sea 1939–1945: The Naval History of World War Two (Third Revised ed.). Annapolis, Maryland: Naval Institute Press. ISBN 1-59114-119-2.
- Whinney, Bob (2000). The U-boat Peril: A Fight for Survival. Cassell. ISBN 0-304-35132-6.
- Whitley, M. J. (1988). Destroyers of World War 2. Annapolis, Maryland: Naval Institute Press. ISBN 0-87021-326-1.
- Winser, John de D. (1999). B.E.F. Ships Before, At and After Dunkirk. Gravesend, Kent: World Ship Society. ISBN 0-905617-91-6.
