= Distinguished Service Cross (United Kingdom) =

British medal for act of gallantry

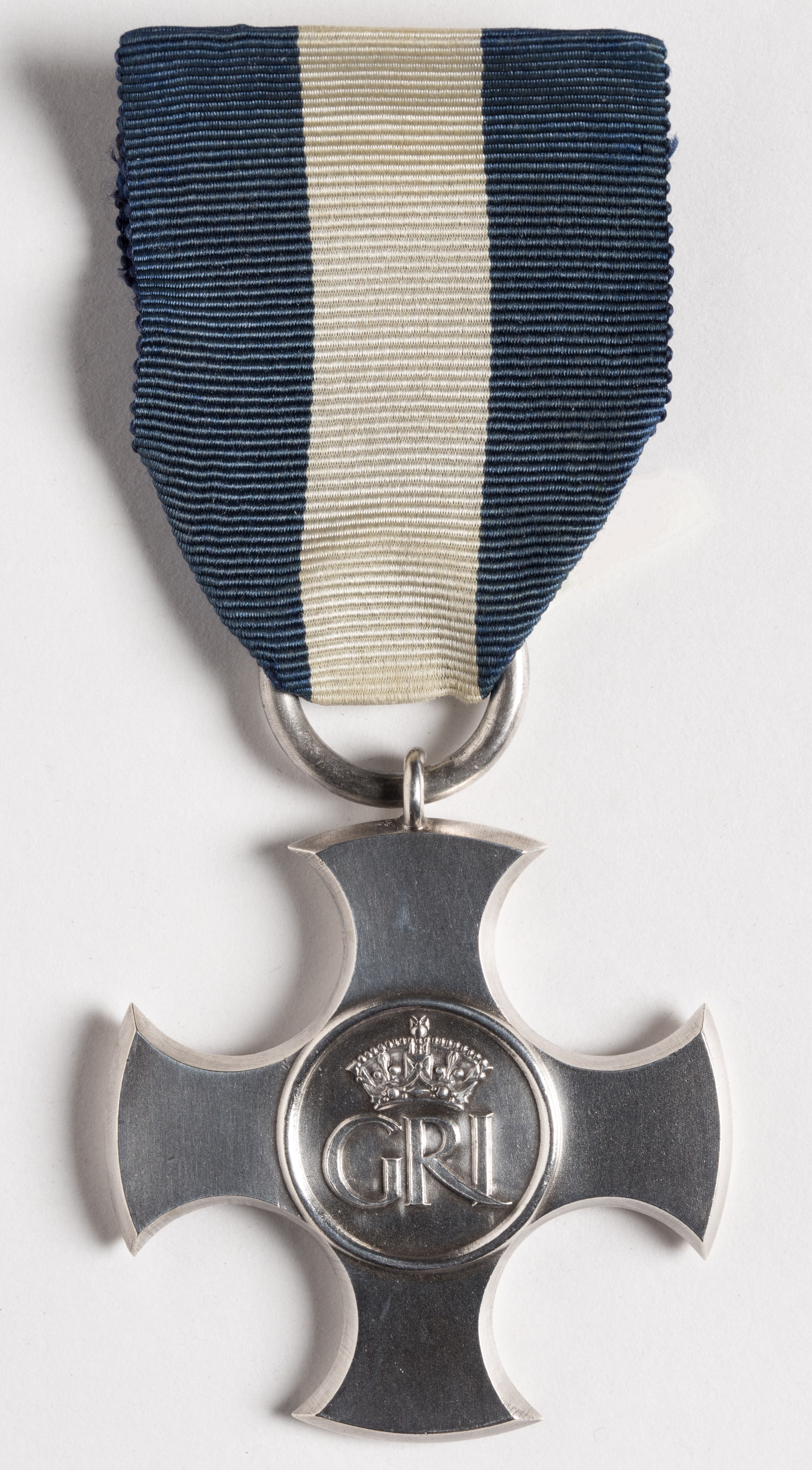
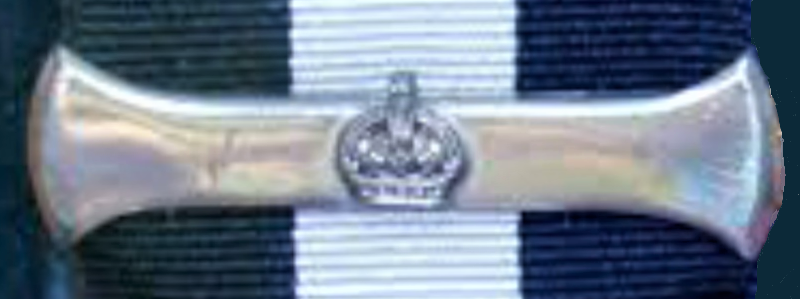
- Obverse of the Cross Ribbon bar for further award
- Type: Military decoration
- Awarded for: Gallantry during active operations against the enemy at sea
- Description: Plain silver cross with rounded ends, 43 mm max height and width
- Presented by: United Kingdom of Great Britain and Northern Ireland
- Eligibility: British, (formerly) Commonwealth, and allied forces
- Status: Currently awarded
- Established: 15 June 1901 (as Conspicuous Service Cross), renamed October 1914

Highlights
- Total: At least 6,658 Crosses and 603 bars
- Distinguished Service Cross ribbon: without bar, and with one and two bars

Order of Wear
- Next (higher): Royal Red Cross, First Class
- Next (lower): Military Cross
- Related: Distinguished Service Medal

The Distinguished Service Cross (DSC) is a third-level military decoration awarded for gallantry during active operations against the enemy at sea to officers; and, since 1993, ratings and other ranks of the British Armed Forces, Royal Fleet Auxiliary and the British Merchant Navy have been eligible. The award was formerly also awarded to members of armed forces of other Commonwealth countries.

The DSC is "awarded in recognition of an act or acts of exemplary gallantry during active operations against the enemy at sea." Since 1979, it can be awarded posthumously.

== History ==
The award was originally created in 1901 as the Conspicuous Service Cross, for award to warrant and subordinate officers, including midshipmen, ineligible for the Distinguished Service Order. It was renamed the Distinguished Service Cross in October 1914, eligibility being extended to all naval officers (commissioned and warrant) below the rank of lieutenant commander.

From March 1915, foreign officers of equivalent rank in allied navies could receive honorary awards; in August 1916, bars were introduced to reward further acts of gallantry meriting the Cross, with a silver rosette worn on the ribbon when worn alone, to denote the award of each bar. During World War I, officers of the Merchant and Fishing Fleets had been awarded the DSC, and their eligibility was legally clarified by an order in council in 1931.

World War II saw a number of changes. In December 1939, eligibility was extended to Naval Officers of the rank of Commander and Lieutenant-Commander. In April 1940, equivalent ranks in the Royal Air Force serving with the Fleet could receive the DSC, and, from November 1942, so could those in the Army aboard defensively equipped merchant ships.

Since the 1993 review of the honours system, as part of the drive to remove distinctions of rank in awards for bravery, the Distinguished Service Medal, formerly the third-level decoration for ratings, has been discontinued. The DSC now serves as the third-level award for gallantry at sea for all ranks, not to the standard required to receive the Victoria Cross or the Conspicuous Gallantry Cross.

The DSC had also been awarded by Commonwealth countries; however, by the 1990s, most of these – including Canada, Australia, and New Zealand – were establishing their own honours systems and no longer recommended British honours.

Recipients are entitled to the post-nominal "DSC".

== Description ==
The DSC is a plain silver cross with rounded ends, with a width of 43 millimetres (1.7 in) and with the following design:

- The obverse has a circular centre containing the royal cypher of the reigning monarch at the time of award surmounted by a crown.
- The reverse is plain apart from the hallmark, and the ribbon is attached via a hallmarked silver ring. From 1940, the year of issue was engraved on lower limb of cross, and since 1984 it has been awarded named to the recipient.
- The ribbon has three equal stripes of dark blue, white, and dark blue.
- The ribbon bar denoting a further award is plain silver, with convex ends and a central crown.

== Recipients ==
=== Numbers awarded ===
Since 1901 at least 6,658 Crosses and 603 bars have been awarded. The dates below reflect the relevant London Gazette entries:

Period		Crosses	1st bar	2nd bar	3rd bar
Pre-1914	1901–1913	8	–	–	–
World War I	1914–1920	1,983	91	10	–
Interwar	1921–1938	7	–	–	–
World War II	1939–1946	4,524	434	44	1
Postwar	1947–2016	136	18	5	–
Total	1901–2016	6,658	543	59	1

A number of honorary awards were made to members of allied foreign forces, including 151 for World War I, and 228 (with 12 first bars and 2 second bars) for World War II. Eight honorary awards were made in 1955 to members of the US Navy for service in Korea.

The above table includes awards to the Dominions:
In all, 199 DSCs have gone to those serving with Canadian forces, with 34 first bars and five second bars. It was replaced in 1993 by the Medal of Military Valour.
182 were awarded to Australians, in addition to 13 first bars and three second bars. Last awarded to an Australian in 1972, it was replaced in 1991 by the Medal for Gallantry.

=== Four-time recipient ===
Only one person has ever been awarded the Distinguished Service Cross four times. Norman Eyre Morley served in the Royal Naval Reserve during World War I and World War II. He was awarded the DSC for the first time in 1919. He was awarded his second DSC in 1944. He was awarded the DSC a further two times in 1945. He gained an entry into the Guinness Book of Records as the most decorated reserve naval officer.

=== List of three-time recipients ===
- William Richard Ashton (Staff Paymaster/Paymaster-Lieutenant, RNR): Awarded the DSC on 23 March 1917, a First Bar on 23 May 1917, and a Second Bar on 2 November 1917. He served with Stephen Philip Robey White as an officer aboard the Q-ship HMS Penshurst during the First World War and was also awarded the Distinguished Service Order (DSO) on 16 March 1918 and the Reserve Decoration (RD). Ashton was a 37 year-old naval paymaster when he worn his bravery medals – relatively old for WW1 military service, and surprising for a paymaster to be directly involved in (multiple) naval battles. He retired with the rank of Paymaster Commander.
- Sir Robert Atkinson, served in the Royal Navy during World War II
- Patrick Bayly, served in the Royal Navy and rose to the rank of vice admiral
- Richard Gatehouse, served in the Royal Navy during World War II and later during the Korean War
- George Onslow Graham, served in the Royal Navy and the Royal New Zealand Navy
- Robert Peverell Hichens, served in the Royal Navy during World War II and was later recommended unsuccessfully for the Victoria Cross
- Geoffrey John Kirkby, served in the Royal Navy during World War II. Awarded DSC in 1940, 1942 and 1944
- Thomas Le Mesurier, served in the Royal Air Force during World War I as a flying ace credited with seven aerial victories. Awarded DSC twice in 1917 and in 1918
- George James Macdonald, served in the Royal New Zealand Navy
- Richard Minifie, served in the Royal Naval Air Service during World War I. Awarded DSC in twice in 1917 and in 1918
- Stanley Orr, served in the Royal Navy during World War II. Awarded DSC in 1940, 1941, and 1944
- Peter Piper, served in the Royal Naval Reserve during World War II. Awarded DSC in 1939 and twice in 1941
- Jack Scatchard, served in the Royal Navy during World War II and the Cold War
- Skule Storheill, served in the Royal Norwegian Navy and attached to the Royal Navy during World War II
- Bob Whinney, served in the Royal Navy during World War II. Awarded DSC thrice in 1944
- Stephen Philip Robey White (Lieutenant, RNR): Awarded the DSC on 23 March 1917, a First Bar on 23 May 1917, and a Second Bar on 2 November 1917. He served with William Richard Ashton as an officer aboard the Q-ship HMS Penshurst during the First World War and was also awarded the Distinguished Service Order (DSO) on 16 March 1918.
- Commander John Eaden (RN) awarded the DSC commanding the submarine Spearfish for actions on September 1939, July 1943 whilst commanding the destroyer Inconstant, he was awarded a First Bar for sinking U-409, and in January 1944 with the Inconstant on convoy escort duties to Murmansk, he was awarded a Second Bar to his DSC for his “ courage, endurance and devotion to duty.”

=== Collective award ===
In 1919, the Distinguished Service Cross was awarded to the City of Dunkirk for the gallant behaviour of its citizens during World War I, and the Cross appears in the coat of arms of the city.

== See also ==
- Recipients of the Distinguished Service Cross
- British and Commonwealth orders and decorations

== Bibliography ==
- Current Royal Warrant for the Distinguished Service Cross, 17 September 2002. London Gazette.
- Abbott, Peter and Tamplin, John – British Gallantry Awards, 2nd edition (1981). Nimrod Dix and Co, London. (ISBN 9780902633742)
- Dorling, H. Taprell – Ribbons and Medals, (1956). A. H. Baldwin & Son
- Duckers, Peter – British Gallantry Awards 1855–2000, (2011). Shire Publications, Risborough, Buckinghamshire. (ISBN 9780747805168)
- Mussell, J (ed) – Medals Yearbook 2015, (2014). Token Publishing, Honiton, Devon. (ISBN 9781908828163)
