= Bob Whinney =

Reginald Fife Whinney
- Born: 8 February 1909; Rathdown, County Dublin, Ireland
- Died: 1 December 1992 (aged 83); New Forest, Hampshire, England
- Military career
- Allegiance: United Kingdom
- Branch: Royal Navy
- Service years: 1927–1961
- Rank: Captain
- Nickname: Bob
- Commands: HMS Wanderer; HMS Dolphin; HMS Euryalus; Chief Staff Officer Intelligence, Mediterranean and Middle East
- Conflicts: Second World War
- Awards: Distinguished Service Cross & Two Bars
- Other work: Cancer Relief

Captain Reginald Fife "Bob" Whinney, DSC & Two Bars (8 February 1909 – 1992) was a Royal Navy officer who specialised in anti-submarine warfare during the Second World War. Whilst in command of the W-class destroyer HMS Wanderer, he helped destroy three German U-boats. For his war services he received the Distinguished Service Cross with two Bars. After the war he was promoted to captain and went on to become Chief Staff Officer Intelligence of the Mediterranean and Middle East during the Suez Crisis. In 1986 he published his memoirs of his service years in The U-Boat Peril: an anti-submarine commanders War. (Note: Republished as a Cassell Military Classics Edition in 1998 (after his death) as The U-Boat Peril: a fight for survival)

== Early life and education ==
Reginald Whinney was born in Rathdown, County Dublin, Ireland on 8 February 1909; his father Harold Fife Whinney was at that time a major in the Oxfordshire and Buckinghamshire Light Infantry (though he rose to lieutenant colonel).

Whinney was first educated at Eastman's Prep School and then enlisted as an officer cadet at Dartmouth Naval College in 1922; an institution of which he was highly critical. Whilst there he met two people who were cast out of the college and went on to gain notoriety; Guy Burgess and Norman Baillie-Stewart.

Upon leaving Dartmouth, Whinney was sent to join HMS Resolution in Malta where (among other duties) he received lectures from Lord Louis Mountbatten. On 1 January 1927 he became a midshipman and soon after transferred to HMS Royal Sovereign under Captain William James. In 1929 Whinney passed his seamanship exam and progressed to the Royal Naval College, Greenwich, to finish his education before leaving as a sub-lieutenant.

== Navy career ==
Whinney was involved the Invergordon Mutiny in 1931 whilst stationed on HMS Rodney and was nearly discharged from the navy. However, after six months of service on the gunnery training ship HMS Iron Duke, his record was cleared and he gained a transfer to the heavy cruiser HMS Suffolk taking passage to the China station.

HMS Suffolk commanded by Captain Errol Manners was soon to become the flagship of Admiral Sir Frederic Dreyer and took passage to Japan to attend the funeral of Marshal-admiral Tōgō Heihachirō. They also travelled to Bali, Borneo, Java, Celebes islands and up the Yangtze River. Whinney then became the first lieutenant of a V and W-class destroyer HMS Wolsey, which was brought out of the Reserve fleet at Malta during the Abyssinia Crisis. Next he was given orders to return to Britain to commence anti submarine training but en route he was asked by the Naval Intelligence Division to travel overland by train through Italy in order to memorise the dispositions of the Italian navy vessels in their ports.

Having passed the exam at Portland, Whinney was appointed as Assistant Anti-Submarine Officer to the 5th Destroyer Flotilla to be stationed aboard HMS Echo. When the Spanish Civil War broke out in July 1936, Echo led three other destroyers from the 5th Destroyer Flotilla in patrolling the north coast of Spain but they returned in November for the fleet inspection at Portland by King Edward VIII. After Edward abdicated Whinney took part in the lining of The Mall at the coronation of King George VI and Queen Elizabeth and then soon after the Fleet review at Spithead on 20 May 1937. When his appointment on Echo was finished Whinney returned as an instructor at the anti-submarine warfare school at Portland where he was given the responsibility of explaining the underwater equipment to visiting dignitaries such as Winston Churchill, the Duke of Kent, Lord Mountbatten and George VI.

Whinney then joined HMS Duncan as the Anti-Submarine Officer (A/S), taking passage to Shanghai where they were stationed when the coded signal arrived to "Commence hostilities against Germany". They returned to the Mediterranean for a short time before being sent back home to Britain in escort to the battleship HMS Barham; on the way back, off the west coast of Ireland, Barham collided with Duncan's sister ship HMS Duchess as the convoy altered course for the Firth of Clyde.

=== Second World War ===
On 17 January 1940, whilst escorting Convoy ON18 Duncan, was accidentally rammed by a Norwegian merchant vessel causing a twenty-foot hole in her side. The vessel was taken under tow to Invergordon for temporary repairs. She was later towed to Grangemouth for repairs that were not completed until 22 July.

After another short stint at the Anti-submarine training school, Whinney joined the lead ship of the 4th Destroyer flotilla, HMS Cossack, under Captain Philip Vian, with whom he had served under as a midshipman on Royal Sovereign. In May 1941 whilst they were escorting a southbound convoy WS8B from Glasgow, they heard that HMS Hood had been sunk by German battleship Bismarck. Cossack, along with Maori, Sikh, Zulu and Polish destroyer ORP Piorun, were detached from the convoy to aid the hunt for Bismarck. On the evening of 26 May Piorun spotted Bismarck and opened fire; Vian kept up the attacks throughout the night, maintaining contact until the arrival of the big ships of the fleet the next day.

Whinney's next appointment was to the staff of the Commander-in-chief, South Atlantic stationed in Freetown, West Africa, where he advised on anti-submarine matters and trained the local escort force. Here he caused a slight controversy when he was sent to investigate the Cape Verde Islands by reconnaissance aircraft for signs of German U-boats being refuelled there; the islands belonged to Britain's allies Portugal and Whinney flying too close was caught snooping. He also caught malaria whilst stationed in West Africa, which necessitated several months of treatment beginning at the Hospital for Tropical Diseases (then based in Liverpool) on his return to Britain at the end of 1942.

==== HMS Wanderer ====
Whinney assumed command of the destroyer HMS Wanderer in April 1943 while it was being converted to a long range escort in the dockyards of Devonport. They served on the Western Approaches Command, initially based at Greenock but later moving to Londonderry. Their first operational job was to escort troop ships for the Allied invasion of Sicily.

On 25 August 1943, during a convoy bound for Gibraltar, Wanderer attacked and sank German submarine U-523 some 400 miles (640 km) off Cape Finisterre with depth charges, whilst co-operating with the British corvette HMS Wallflower. U-523 suffered 17 dead with 37 survivors. The following day, Wanderer delivered an advance RAF party to Portugal to implement the agreement signed between Britain and Portugal for the use of airfields in the Azores from which to operate their maritime patrol aircraft.

On 17 Jan 1944 Wanderer, in concert with the frigate HMS Glenarm, sank a U-boat (identified as U-305) but possibly U-377 in the North Atlantic. Whinney was concerned about the repercussions of this action, as he had disobeyed an order, and carried out an unauthorized attack, to achieve this result, but he was awarded the Distinguished Service Cross (DSC) in February 1944, and on 20 June 1944 he was awarded a Bar to the decoration.

On 5 July 1944, while supporting the Normandy Invasion, Wanderer and the British frigate HMS Tavy sank U-390 in the Baie de la Seine, English Channel, with depth charges; 48 were killed with 1 survivor. 49°52′N 00°48′W Whinney received a second Bar to his DSC for this action in October 1944. Having landed the survivor from U-390 at Portland Whinney discovered that Wanderer was no longer sea worthy so he was reassigned to a job in the Admiralty assessing reports of anti-submarine actions. However, having been on the job for only a few weeks Whinney fell ill with "operational fatigue" in late December and so it came as a great surprise to be promoted to commander on 31 December 1944.

After a short spell on the sick list, Whinney decided to get back to work and was offered a post as Executive Commander at HMS Dolphin, the Royal Navy submarine school at Fort Blockhouse.

== Post-war ==
After the war, Whinney's next assignment was as Executive Commander on HMS Euryalus in the Mediterranean until he injured his back playing polo and was invalided back home. He then served ashore firstly at the Seaward defence school then in 1950 he was promoted to captain and became Deputy Director of the Underwater Weapons Department at Bath. Next he became Chief Staff Officer Intelligence, Mediterranean and Middle East where he was stationed during the Suez Crisis. Then, after a short while in the Reserve Fleet, he took his final posting as a naval attaché in Yugoslavia.

In retirement Whinney worked for Cancer Relief and wrote his memoirs, The U-Boat Peril. He married twice and had a son and two daughters from his first marriage.

== Works ==
- The U-Boat Peril, Arrow Books, London, 1986 ISBN 0-09-962030-8

== Footnotes ==
=== Sources ===
- "Supplement to the London Gazette 20 June 1944" (PDF). The London Gazette.
- "Supplement to the London Gazette 10 October 1944" (PDF). The London Gazette.
- ADM 196/150/288, National Archives
- "HMS Duncan". naval-history.net.
- "HMS Wanderer". naval-history.net.
- "Commander Patrick Whinney". The Telegraph. 4 January 2005.
- "Person page 25282". The Peerage.
- Helgason, Guðmundur. "U-377". German U-boats of WWII - uboat.net.
- Helgason, Guðmundur. "U-390". German U-boats of WWII - uboat.net.
- "Family card". varrall.net.
- "Captain Bob Whinney – Obituary", The Weekly Telegraph, p. 46, 6 January 1993
- Whinney, Bob. The U-Boat Peril: a fight for survival. Cassell Military Classics, London, 1998. ISBN 0-304-35132-6.
