= German submarine U-314 =

German World War II submarine

Coordinates: 73°41′N 24°30′E

History

Nazi Germany
- Name: U-314
- Ordered: 25 August 1941
- Builder: Flender Werke, Lübeck
- Yard number: 314
- Laid down: 9 June 1942
- Launched: 17 April 1943
- Commissioned: 10 June 1943
- Fate: Sunk on 30 January 1944

General characteristics
- Class & type: Type VIIC submarine
- Displacement: 769 tonnes (757 long tons) surfaced; 871 t (857 long tons) submerged
- Length: 67.10 m (220 ft 2 in) o/a; 50.50 m (165 ft 8 in) pressure hull
- Beam: 6.20 m (20 ft 4 in) o/a; 4.70 m (15 ft 5 in) pressure hull
- Height: 9.60 m (31 ft 6 in)
- Draught: 4.74 m (15 ft 7 in)
- Installed power: 2,800–3,200 PS (2,100–2,400 kW; 2,800–3,200 bhp) (diesels); 750 PS (550 kW; 740 shp) (electric)
- Propulsion: 2 shafts; 2 × diesel engines; 2 × electric motors.
- Speed: 17.7 knots (32.8 km/h; 20.4 mph) surfaced; 7.6 knots (14.1 km/h; 8.7 mph) submerged
- Range: 8,500 nmi (15,700 km; 9,800 mi) at 10 knots (19 km/h; 12 mph) surfaced; 80 nmi (150 km; 92 mi) at 4 knots (7.4 km/h; 4.6 mph) submerged
- Test depth: 230 m (750 ft); Crush depth: 250–295 m (820–968 ft)
- Complement: 4 officers, 40–56 enlisted
- Armament: 5 × 53.3 cm (21 in) torpedo tubes (four bow, one stern); 14 × torpedoes or 26 TMA mines; 1 × 8.8 cm (3.46 in) deck gun (220 rounds); 2 × twin 2 cm (0.79 in) C/30 anti-aircraft guns

Service record
- Part of: 8th U-boat Flotilla; 10 June – 31 December 1943; 11th U-boat Flotilla; 1 – 30 January 1944
- Identification codes: M 46 712
- Commanders: Kptlt. Georg-Wilhelm Basse; 10 June 1943 – 30 January 1944
- Operations: 2 patrols: 1st patrol: 22 December 1943 – 14 January 1944; 2nd patrol: 25 – 30 January 1944
- Victories: None

German submarine U-314 was a Type VIIC U-boat of Nazi Germany's Kriegsmarine during World War II. The submarine was laid down on 9 June 1942 at the Flender Werke yard at Lübeck as yard number 314, launched on 17 April 1943 and commissioned on 10 June under the command of Kapitänleutnant Georg-Wilhelm Basse.

During her short career, the U-boat sailed on two combat patrols, but sank no ships before she was sunk on 30 January 1944. She was a member of four wolfpacks.

== Design ==
German Type VIIC submarines were preceded by the shorter Type VIIB submarines. U-314 had a displacement of 769 tonnes (757 long tons) when at the surface and 871 tonnes (857 long tons) while submerged. She had a total length of 67.10 m (220 ft 2 in), a pressure hull length of 50.50 m (165 ft 8 in), a beam of 6.20 m (20 ft 4 in), a height of 9.60 m (31 ft 6 in), and a draught of 4.74 m (15 ft 7 in). The submarine was powered by two Germaniawerft F46 four-stroke, six-cylinder supercharged diesel engines producing a total of 2,800 to 3,200 metric horsepower (2,060 to 2,350 kW; 2,760 to 3,160 shp) for use while surfaced, two Garbe, Lahmeyer & Co. RP 137/c double-acting electric motors producing a total of 750 metric horsepower (550 kW; 740 shp) for use while submerged. She had two shafts and two 1.23 m (4 ft) propellers. The boat was capable of operating at depths of up to 230 metres (750 ft).

The submarine had a maximum surface speed of 17.7 knots (32.8 km/h; 20.4 mph) and a maximum submerged speed of 7.6 knots (14.1 km/h; 8.7 mph). When submerged, the boat could operate for 80 nautical miles (150 km; 92 mi) at 4 knots (7.4 km/h; 4.6 mph); when surfaced, she could travel 8,500 nautical miles (15,700 km; 9,800 mi) at 10 knots (19 km/h; 12 mph). U-314 was fitted with five 53.3 cm (21 in) torpedo tubes (four fitted at the bow and one at the stern), fourteen torpedoes, one 8.8 cm (3.46 in) SK C/35 naval gun, 220 rounds, and two twin 2 cm (0.79 in) C/30 anti-aircraft guns. The boat had a complement of between forty-four and sixty.

== Service history ==
The boat's service life began with training with the 8th U-boat Flotilla from June 1943. She was then transferred to the 11th flotilla for operations on 1 January 1944.

=== First patrol ===
U-314's first patrol took her to the Barents Sea, then south of Bear Island. She departed from Trondheim in Norway on 22 December 1943; the patrol finished at Hammerfest, northeast of Narvik, on 14 January 1944.

=== Second patrol and loss ===
The boat left Hammerfest on 25 January 1944. She was sunk on the 30th by depth charges dropped by the British destroyers HMS Whitehall and Meteor southeast of Bear Island.

Forty-nine men died; there were no survivors.

=== Wolfpacks ===
U-314 took part in four wolfpacks, namely:

- Eisenbart (24 December 1943 - 5 January 1944)
- Isegrim (5 – 13 January 1944)
- Isegrim (25 – 27 January 1944)
- Werwolf (27 – 30 January 1944)

== See also ==
- Battle of the Atlantic (1939-1945)

== Bibliography ==
- Busch, Rainer; Röll, Hans-Joachim (1999). German U-boat commanders of World War II : a biographical dictionary. Translated by Brooks, Geoffrey. London, Annapolis, Md: Greenhill Books, Naval Institute Press. ISBN 1-55750-186-6.
- Busch, Rainer; Röll, Hans-Joachim (1999). Der U-Boot-Krieg, 1939-1945: Deutsche U-Boot-Verluste von September 1939 bis Mai 1945 [German U-boat losses from September 1939 to May 1945] (in German). Vol. IV. Hamburg, Berlin, Bonn: Mittler. ISBN 3-8132-0514-2.
- Gröner, Erich; Jung, Dieter; Maass, Martin (1991). U-boats and Mine Warfare Vessels. German Warships 1815–1945. Vol. 2. Translated by Thomas, Keith; Magowan, Rachel. London: Conway Maritime Press. ISBN 0-85177-593-4.
- Kemp, Paul (1999). U-Boats Destroyed - German Submarine Losses in the World Wars. London: Arms & Armour. ISBN 1-85409-515-3.
