= German submarine U-306 =

German World War II submarine

History

Nazi Germany
- Name: U-306
- Ordered: 20 January 1941
- Builder: Flender Werke, Lübeck
- Yard number: 306
- Laid down: 16 September 1941
- Launched: 29 August 1942
- Commissioned: 21 October 1942
- Fate: Sunk on 31 October 1943

General characteristics
- Class & type: Type VIIC submarine
- Displacement: 769 tonnes (757 long tons) surfaced; 871 t (857 long tons) submerged
- Length: 67.10 m (220 ft 2 in) o/a; 50.50 m (165 ft 8 in) pressure hull
- Beam: 6.20 m (20 ft 4 in) o/a; 4.70 m (15 ft 5 in) pressure hull
- Height: 9.60 m (31 ft 6 in)
- Draught: 4.74 m (15 ft 7 in)
- Installed power: 2,800–3,200 PS (2,100–2,400 kW; 2,800–3,200 bhp) (diesels); 750 PS (550 kW; 740 shp) (electric)
- Propulsion: 2 shafts; 2 × diesel engines; 2 × electric motors
- Speed: 17.7 knots (32.8 km/h; 20.4 mph) surfaced; 7.6 knots (14.1 km/h; 8.7 mph) submerged
- Range: 8,500 nmi (15,700 km; 9,800 mi) at 10 knots (19 km/h; 12 mph) surfaced; 80 nmi (150 km; 92 mi) at 4 knots (7.4 km/h; 4.6 mph) submerged
- Test depth: 230 m (750 ft); Crush depth: 250–295 m (820–968 ft)
- Complement: 4 officers, 40–56 enlisted
- Armament: 5 × 53.3 cm (21 in) torpedo tubes (four bow, one stern); 14 × torpedoes or 26 TMA mines; 1 × 8.8 cm (3.46 in) deck gun (220 rounds); 2 × twin 2 cm (0.79 in) C/30 anti-aircraft guns

Service record
- Part of: 8th U-boat Flotilla; 21 October 1942 – 28 February 1943; 1st U-boat Flotilla; 1 March – 31 October 1943
- Identification codes: M 49 352
- Commanders: Kptlt. Claus von Trotha; 21 October 1942 – 31 October 1943
- Operations: 5 patrols: 1st patrol: 25 February – 9 May 1943; 2nd patrol: 10 June – 11 August 1943; 3rd patrol: 23 – 24 September 1943; 4th patrol: 7 – 10 October 1943; 5th patrol: 14 – 31 October 1943
- Victories: 1 merchant ship sunk (10,218 GRT); 2 merchant ships damaged (11,195 GRT)

German submarine U-306 was a Type VIIC U-boat of Nazi Germany's Kriegsmarine during World War II. The submarine was laid down on 16 September 1941 at the Flender Werke yard at Lübeck as yard number 306, launched on 29 August 1942 and commissioned on 21 October under the command of Oberleutnant Claus von Trotha.

During her career, the U-boat sailed on five combat patrols, sinking one ship and damaging two others, before she was sunk on 31 October 1943 in mid-Atlantic, northwest of the Azores by British warships.

She was a member of three wolfpacks.

== Design ==
German Type VIIC submarines were preceded by the shorter Type VIIB submarines. U-306 had a displacement of 769 tonnes (757 long tons) when at the surface and 871 tonnes (857 long tons) while submerged. She had a total length of 67.10 m (220 ft 2 in), a pressure hull length of 50.50 m (165 ft 8 in), a beam of 6.20 m (20 ft 4 in), a height of 9.60 m (31 ft 6 in), and a draught of 4.74 m (15 ft 7 in). The submarine was powered by two Germaniawerft F46 four-stroke, six-cylinder supercharged diesel engines producing a total of 2,800 to 3,200 metric horsepower (2,060 to 2,350 kW; 2,760 to 3,160 shp) for use while surfaced, two Garbe, Lahmeyer & Co. RP 137/c double-acting electric motors producing a total of 750 metric horsepower (550 kW; 740 shp) for use while submerged. She had two shafts and two 1.23 m (4 ft) propellers. The boat was capable of operating at depths of up to 230 metres (750 ft).

The submarine had a maximum surface speed of 17.7 knots (32.8 km/h; 20.4 mph) and a maximum submerged speed of 7.6 knots (14.1 km/h; 8.7 mph). When submerged, the boat could operate for 80 nautical miles (150 km; 92 mi) at 4 knots (7.4 km/h; 4.6 mph); when surfaced, she could travel 8,500 nautical miles (15,700 km; 9,800 mi) at 10 knots (19 km/h; 12 mph). U-306 was fitted with five 53.3 cm (21 in) torpedo tubes (four fitted at the bow and one at the stern), fourteen torpedoes, one 8.8 cm (3.46 in) SK C/35 naval gun, 220 rounds, and two twin 2 cm (0.79 in) C/30 anti-aircraft guns. The boat had a complement of between forty-four and sixty.

== Service history ==
The boat's service life began with training with the 8th U-boat Flotilla on 21 October 1942. She was then transferred to the 1st flotilla for operations on 1 March 1943.

=== First patrol ===
The submarine's first patrol began with her departure from Kiel on 25 February 1943. On 22 April she sank the Amerika south of Cape Farewell, Greenland. The next day she damaged the Silvermaple. She arrived in Brest in occupied France, on 9 May.

=== Second and third patrols ===
U-306's second foray was relatively uneventful; starting in Brest, it took her as far south as Guinea-Bissau. Off the Gambia, she damaged the Kaipara on 16 July 1943. The boat then docked in Lorient on 11 August.

Her third sortie was rather brief, lasting between 23 and 24 September 1943.

=== Fourth patrol ===
On her fourth patrol, she sailed along the French Atlantic coast toward St. Nazaire.

=== Fifth patrol and loss ===
The boat was sunk northwest of the Azores by depth charges dropped from the British destroyer HMS Whitehall and the corvette Geranium on 31 October 1943.

Fifty-one men died; there were no survivors.

== Summary of raiding history ==
Date	Ship Name	Nationality	Tonnage (GRT)	Fate
22 April 1943	Amerika	United Kingdom	10,218	Sunk
23 April 1943	Silvermaple	United Kingdom	5,313	Damaged
16 July 1943	Kaipara	United Kingdom	5,882	Damaged

== Bibliography ==
- Busch, Rainer; Röll, Hans-Joachim (1999). German U-boat commanders of World War II : a biographical dictionary. Translated by Brooks, Geoffrey. London, Annapolis, Md: Greenhill Books, Naval Institute Press. ISBN 1-55750-186-6.
- Busch, Rainer; Röll, Hans-Joachim (1999). Der U-Boot-Krieg, 1939-1945: Deutsche U-Boot-Verluste von September 1939 bis Mai 1945 [German U-boat losses from September 1939 to May 1945] (in German). Vol. IV. Hamburg, Berlin, Bonn: Mittler. ISBN 3-8132-0514-2.
- Gröner, Erich; Jung, Dieter; Maass, Martin (1991). U-boats and Mine Warfare Vessels. German Warships 1815–1945. Vol. 2. Translated by Thomas, Keith; Magowan, Rachel. London: Conway Maritime Press. ISBN 0-85177-593-4.
- Kemp, Paul (1999). U-Boats Destroyed – German Submarine Losses in the World Wars. London: Arms & Armour. ISBN 1-85409-515-3.
