= German submarine U-523 =

German World War II submarine

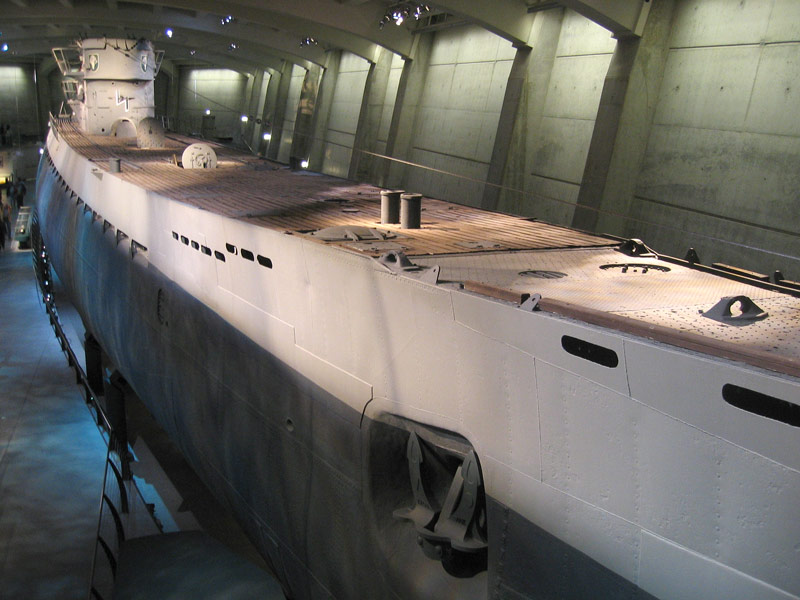
- U-505, a typical Type IXC boat

History

Nazi Germany
- Name: U-523
- Ordered: 14 February 1940
- Builder: Deutsche Werft, Hamburg
- Yard number: 338
- Laid down: 4 August 1941
- Launched: 15 April 1942
- Commissioned: 25 June 1942
- Fate: Sunk on 25 August 1943

General characteristics
- Class & type: Type IXC submarine
- Displacement: 1,120 t (1,100 long tons) surfaced; 1,232 t (1,213 long tons) submerged
- Length: 76.76 m (251 ft 10 in) o/a; 58.75 m (192 ft 9 in) pressure hull
- Beam: 6.76 m (22 ft 2 in) o/a; 4.40 m (14 ft 5 in) pressure hull
- Height: 9.60 m (31 ft 6 in)
- Draught: 4.70 m (15 ft 5 in)
- Installed power: 4,400 PS (3,200 kW; 4,300 bhp) (diesels); 1,000 PS (740 kW; 990 shp) (electric)
- Propulsion: 2 shafts; 2 × diesel engines; 2 × electric motors
- Speed: 18.3 knots (33.9 km/h; 21.1 mph) surfaced; 7.3 knots (13.5 km/h; 8.4 mph) submerged
- Range: 13,450 nmi (24,910 km; 15,480 mi) at 10 knots (19 km/h; 12 mph) surfaced; 63 nmi (117 km; 72 mi) at 4 knots (7.4 km/h; 4.6 mph) submerged
- Test depth: 230 m (750 ft)
- Complement: 48 to 56
- Armament: 6 × torpedo tubes (4 bow, 2 stern); 22 × 53.3 cm (21 in) torpedoes; 1 × 10.5 cm (4.1 in) SK C/32 deck gun (180 rounds); 1 × 3.7 cm (1.5 in) SK C/30 AA gun; 1 × twin 2 cm FlaK 30 AA guns

Service record
- Part of: 4th U-boat Flotilla; 25 June 1942 – 31 January 1943; 10th U-boat Flotilla; 1 February – 25 August 1943
- Commanders: Kptlt. Werner Pietzsch; 25 June 1942 – 25 August 1943
- Operations: 4 patrols: 1st patrol: 9 February – 16 April 1943; 2nd patrol: 22 – 26 May 1943; 3rd patrol: 1 – 3 August 1943; 4th patrol: 16 – 25 August 1943
- Victories: 1 merchant ship sunk (5,848 GRT)

German submarine U-523 was a Type IXC U-boat of Nazi Germany's Kriegsmarine during World War II. The submarine was laid down on 4 August 1941 at the Deutsche Werft yard in Hamburg as yard number 338. She was launched on 15 April 1942, and commissioned on 25 June under the command of Kapitänleutnant Werner Pietzsch. After training with the 4th U-boat Flotilla in the Baltic Sea, the U-boat was transferred to the 10th flotilla for front-line service on 1 February 1943.

== Design and construction ==
German Type IXC submarines were slightly larger than the original Type IXBs. U-523 had a displacement of 1,120 tonnes (1,100 long tons) when at the surface and 1,232 tonnes (1,213 long tons) while submerged. The U-boat had a total length of 76.76 m (251 ft 10 in), a pressure hull length of 58.75 m (192 ft 9 in), a beam of 6.76 m (22 ft 2 in), a height of 9.60 m (31 ft 6 in), and a draught of 4.70 m (15 ft 5 in). The submarine was powered by two MAN M 9 V 40/46 supercharged four-stroke, nine-cylinder diesel engines producing a total of 4,400 metric horsepower (3,240 kW; 4,340 shp) for use while surfaced, two Siemens-Schuckert 2 GU 345/34 double-acting electric motors producing a total of 1,000 shaft horsepower (1,010 PS; 750 kW) for use while submerged. She had two shafts and two 1.92 m (6 ft) propellers. The boat was capable of operating at depths of up to 230 metres (750 ft).

The submarine had a maximum surface speed of 18.3 knots (33.9 km/h; 21.1 mph) and a maximum submerged speed of 7.3 knots (13.5 km/h; 8.4 mph). When submerged, the boat could operate for 63 nautical miles (117 km; 72 mi) at 4 knots (7.4 km/h; 4.6 mph); when surfaced, she could travel 13,450 nautical miles (24,910 km; 15,480 mi) at 10 knots (19 km/h; 12 mph). U-523 was fitted with six 53.3 cm (21 in) torpedo tubes (four fitted at the bow and two at the stern), 22 torpedoes, one 10.5 cm (4.13 in) SK C/32 naval gun, 180 rounds, and a 3.7 cm (1.5 in) SK C/30 as well as a 2 cm (0.79 in) C/30 anti-aircraft gun. The boat had a complement of forty-eight.

U-523 was one of twelve Type IXC submarines ordered from Deutsche Werft on 14 February 1940. The submarine was laid down at Deutsche Werft's Hamburg shipyard on 4 August 1941, as yard number 338. She was launched on 15 April 1942 and commissioned on 25 June 1942.

== Service history ==
Following commissioning, U-523 joined the 4th U-boat Flotilla based at Stettin, Prussia (now Szczecin, Poland) for crew training and workup in the Baltic Sea. While training in the Baltic, U-523 carried out tests of the Focke-Achgelis Fa 330 rotor kite. On 16 September 1942, the submarine was in collision with the battleship Scharnhorst. Repair delayed U-523's transfer to operations by several months.

=== First patrol ===
U-523 was transferred to the operational 10th U-boat Flotilla at the start of February 1943, and departed from Kiel on 9 February 1943 on her first patrol and sailed out into the mid-Atlantic. On the morning of 19 March the 5,848 GRT American merchant ship Mathew Luckenbach, part of Convoy HX 229 en route to the UK from New York City, was hit by two torpedoes fired by U-527. Around 20:00 that evening, U-523 discovered the drifting wreck of the Mathew Luckenbach and hit her with a single torpedo, sinking the ship within seven minutes. The U-boat arrived at her new home port of Lorient, in occupied France, on 16 April 1943 after 67 days at sea.

=== Second patrol ===
U-523 sailed from Lorient on 22 May 1943, but on the 24th, still in the Bay of Biscay, she was bombed by a British Whitley medium bomber of No. 10 Operational Training Unit RAF. The U-boat was severely damaged and was forced to return to Lorient.

=== Third and fourth patrols ===
U-523 sailed from Lorient briefly on 1 August 1943, for a voyage lasting only three days, before setting out once more on 16 August, and headed south-west.

The U-boat was sunk on 25 August, west of Vigo, Spain, in position 42°03′N 18°02′W, by depth charges from the destroyer HMS Wanderer and the corvette HMS Wallflower. Seventeen of U-523's crew were killed and 37 survived the attack.

=== Wolfpacks ===
U-523 took part in four wolfpacks, namely:

- Burggraf (24 February – 5 March 1943)
- Westmark (6 – 11 March 1943)
- Stürmer (11 – 20 March 1943)
- Seeteufel (23 – 30 March 1943)

== Summary of raiding history ==
| Date | Ship Name | Nationality | Tonnage (GRT) | Fate |
|---|---|---|---|---|
| 19 March 1943 | Mathew Luckenbach | United States | 5,848 | Sunk |

== Bibliography ==
- Bishop, Chris (2006). Kriegsmarine U-Boats, 1939–45. London: Amber Books. ISBN 978-1-904687-96-2.
- Blair, Clay (2000). Hitler's U-Boat War: The Hunted 1942–1945. New York: Modern Library. ISBN 0-679-64033-9.
- Busch, Rainer; Röll, Hans-Joachim (1999). German U-boat commanders of World War II : a biographical dictionary. Translated by Brooks, Geoffrey. London, Annapolis, Md: Greenhill Books, Naval Institute Press. ISBN 1-55750-186-6.
- Busch, Rainer; Röll, Hans-Joachim (1999). Deutsche U-Boot-Verluste von September 1939 bis Mai 1945 [German U-boat losses from September 1939 to May 1945]. Der U-Boot-Krieg (in German). Vol. IV. Hamburg, Berlin, Bonn: Mittler. ISBN 3-8132-0514-2.
- Gröner, Erich; Jung, Dieter; Maass, Martin (1991). U-boats and Mine Warfare Vessels. German Warships 1815–1945. Vol. 2. Translated by Thomas, Keith; Magowan, Rachel. London: Conway Maritime Press. ISBN 0-85177-593-4.
- Kemp, Paul (1999). U-Boats Destroyed - German Submarine Losses in the World Wars. London: Arms & Armour. ISBN 1-85409-515-3.
- Niestlé, Axel (2014). German U-Boat Losses During World War II: Details of Destruction. Barnsley, UK: Frontline Books. ISBN 978-1-84832-210-3.
- Paterson, Lawrence (2016). Hitler's Grey Wolves : U-Boats in the Indian Ocean. Havertown: Frontline Books. ISBN 9781473882751.
- Wynn, Kenneth (1998). U-Boat Operations of the Second World War: Volume 2: Career Histories, U511–UIT25. London: Chatham Publishing. ISBN 1-86176-069-8.
