= LÉ Maev =

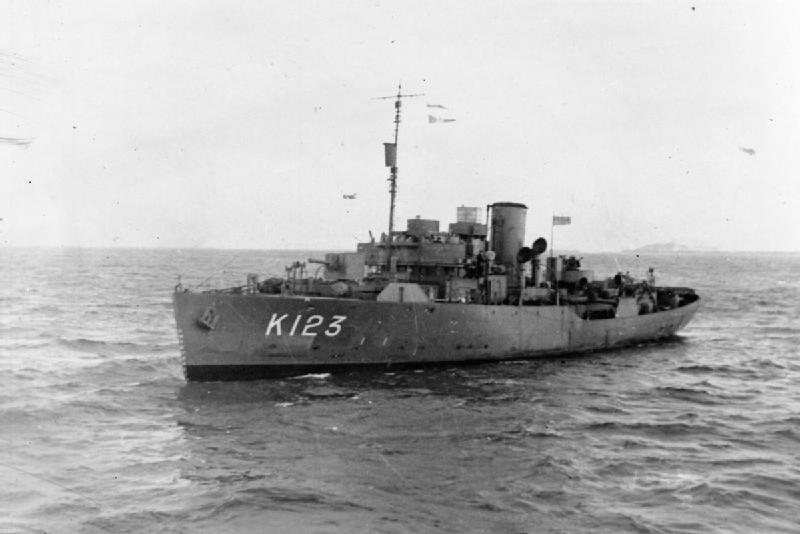
- HMS Oxlip

History

United Kingdom
- Name: HMS Oxlip
- Namesake: Oxlip
- Builder: A & J Inglis, Glasgow
- Laid down: 9 December 1940
- Launched: 28 August 1941
- Completed: 28 December 1941
- Decommissioned: 1946
- Maiden voyage: 1942
- In service: 1942–1946
- Identification: Pennant number: K123
- Fate: Sold to Irish Navy 1946

Ireland
- Name: LÉ Maev
- Namesake: Medb, the legendary queen of Connacht
- Acquired: 1946
- Identification: Pennant number: 02
- Fate: Scrapped 23 March 1972

General characteristics
- Class & type: Flower-class corvette
- Displacement: 1,020 tons standard (1,280 full load)
- Length: 205 ft (62 m)
- Beam: 33 ft (10 m)
- Depth: 14 ft (4.3 m)
- Installed power: Single reciprocating vertical 4-cylinder triple expansion by John Kincaid, Greenock
- Propulsion: 2,759 ihp (2,057 kW) 2 cylindrical Scotch single-ended boilers. Single shaft
- Speed: max: 16 knots (30 km/h; 18 mph); cruising: 12 knots (22 km/h; 14 mph)
- Complement: 5 officers, 74 ratings
- Sensors & processing systems: ASDIC; Radio; Radar; Gyrocompass; Echo sounder; Decca Navigator System
- Electronic warfare & decoys: Degaussing

LÉ Maev /ˈmeɪv/ was a Flower-class corvette of the Irish Naval Service. She was launched in August 1941 as HMS Oxlip, and served on the Arctic convoys during World War II.

== Construction ==
HMS Oxlip was ordered in July 1939 as part of the Royal Navy's 1939 War Emergency building programme. The Flower-class corvette was laid down by A & J Inglis of Glasgow on 9 December 1940, launched on 28 August 1941 and completed on 28 December the same year. After working up and trials she joined Western Approaches Command for anti-submarine warfare and convoy escort duties.

== Royal Navy service ==
From February 1942 onwards Oxlip served with close escort groups on Arctic convoys taking war materiel from the Western Allies to the Soviet Union. In three years Oxlip sailed with 18 Arctic convoys (outbound and homebound), contributing to the safe and timely arrival of more than 300 merchant ships. With the end of hostilities she was decommissioned and in 1946 she was sold to the Irish Government.

=== Convoys escorted ===
Arctic convoys 1942−1045
Outbound	Homebound
PQ 11	QP 8
PQ 14	QP 11
JW 51A	RA 52
JW 55B	RA 55B
JW 56B	RA 56
JW 59	RA 59A
JW 61	RA 61
JW 65	RA 65
JW 66	RA 66

== Irish Naval Service ==
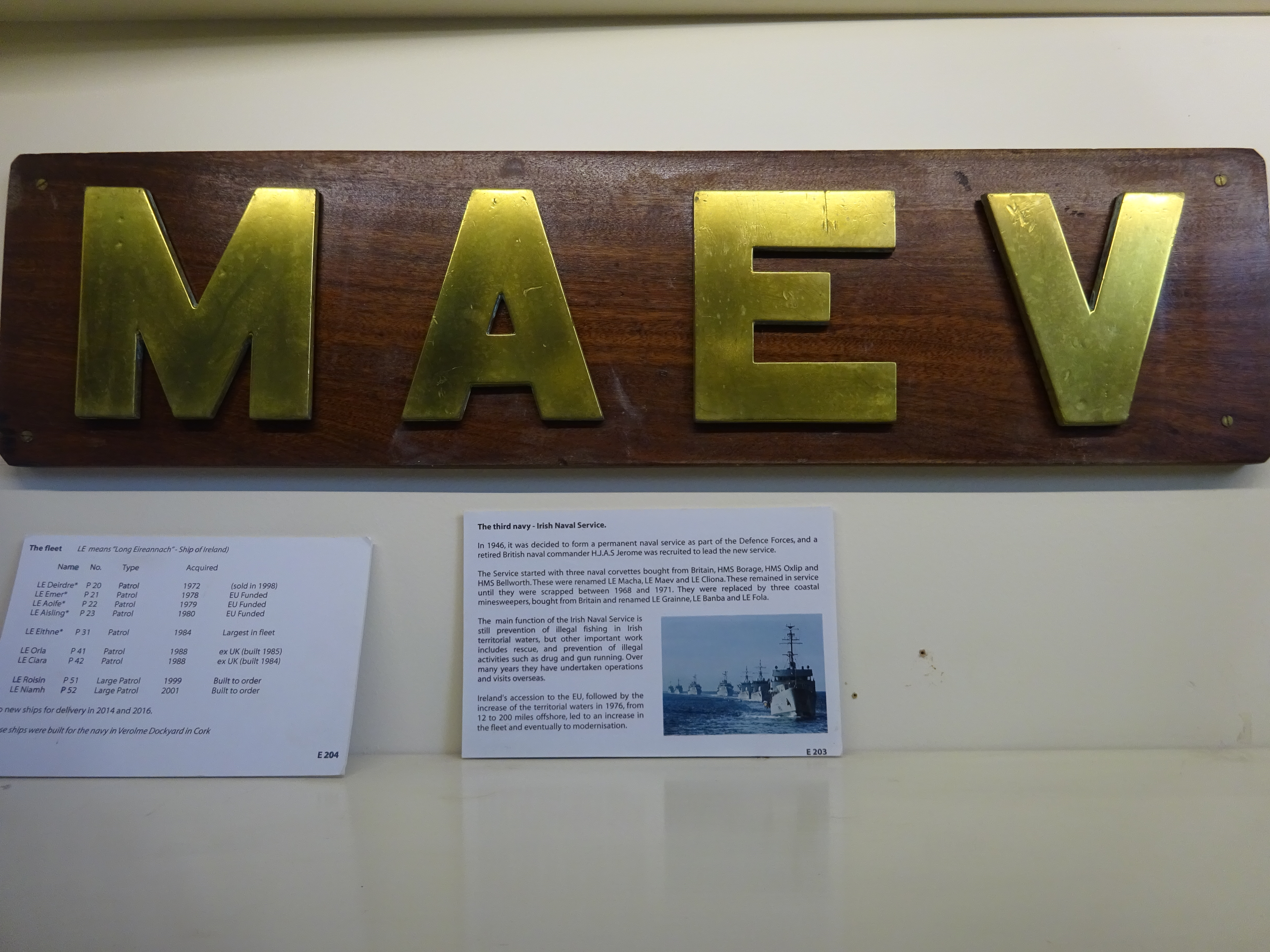
Nameplate of LÉ Maev, on display in the Maritime Museum of Ireland

LÉ Maev was commissioned into Irish service in December 1946, and named after Medb, the legendary queen of Connacht.

She was decommissioned in March 1972.
