= HMS Geranium (K16) =

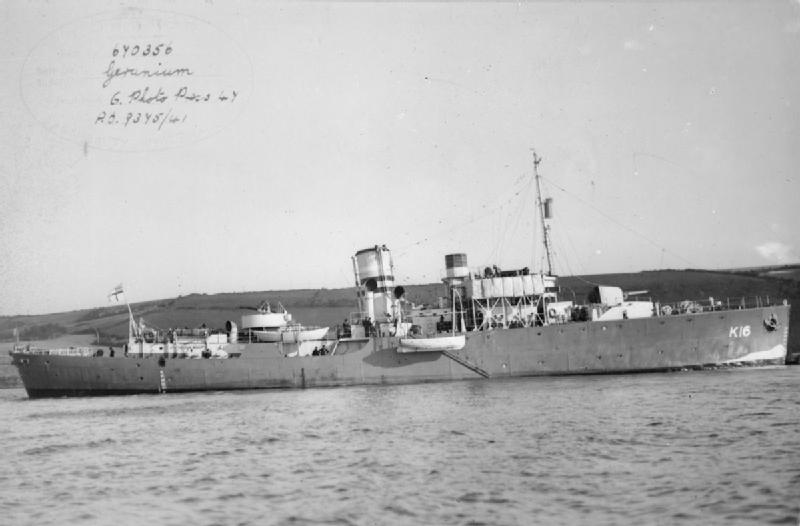
- HMS Geranium seen during the Second World War

History

United Kingdom
- Name: Geranium
- Namesake: Geranium
- Builder: William Simmons & Co., Renfrew, Scotland
- Laid down: 21 September 1939
- Launched: 23 April 1939
- Commissioned: 24 June 1939
- Identification: K16
- Fate: Transferred to Denmark in 1945

Denmark
- Name: Thetis
- Namesake: Thetis
- Acquired: 1945
- Commissioned: 1 October 1945
- Decommissioned: 8 May 1963
- Identification: F340
- Fate: Scrapped in 1963

General characteristics
- Class & type: Flower-class corvette
- Displacement: 1,150 long tons (1,168 t)
- Length: 62.65 m (205 ft 7 in)
- Beam: 10 m (32 ft 10 in)
- Draught: 3.5 m (11 ft 6 in)
- Speed: 16 knots (30 km/h; 18 mph)
- Range: 3,500 nmi (6,500 km; 4,000 mi) at 12 knots (22 km/h; 14 mph)
- Complement: 85
- Armament: 1 × 75 mm (3.0 in) gun; 1 × 40 mm (1.6 in) autocannon; 2 × 20 mm (0.79 in) autocannon; 1 × Hedgehog anti-submarine mortar; 4 × depth charge mortars; 2 × depth charge launchers

HMS Geranium (K16) was a Flower-class corvette that served in the Royal Navy during the Second World War. She was later sold to Denmark and renamed HDMS Thetis.

== Construction and career ==
=== Royal Navy ===
The ship was ordered 25 July 1939 and laid down 21 September 1939 at William Simmons & Co. in Renfrew, Scotland. The ship was launched on 23 April 1940 and commissioned 24 June 1940.

In August 1942, the ship participated in Operation Pedestal, a British convoy to supply Malta. In the operation, she was assigned to Force R along with three other corvettes and a tug to protect the fleet oil tankers: RFA Brown Ranger and RFA Dingledale. She was under the command of Alan Foxall, RNR.

In 1943, the ship was operating in the Atlantic engaged in anti-submarine warfare. On 31 October, together with HMS Whitehall she sunk German submarine U-306 with depth charges and hedgehog attacks.

=== Danish Navy ===
The ship was sold to the Royal Danish Navy in 1945. They renamed her HDMS Thetis (F340) and she entered service. The ship was scrapped in 1963.

== Honours ==
The ship featured on a 2012 Maltese postal stamp.
