= HMS Opportune (G80) =

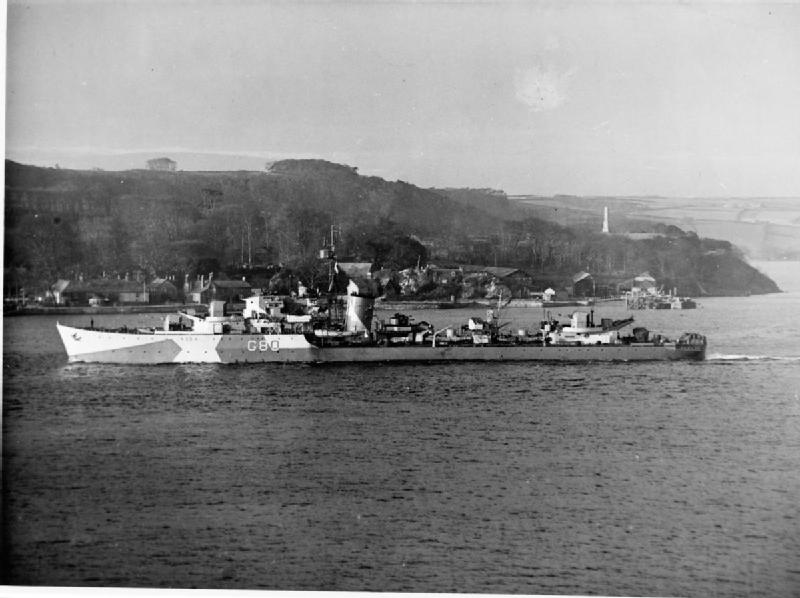

History

United Kingdom
- Name: Opportune
- Ordered: 3 September 1939
- Laid down: 28 March 1940
- Launched: 21 February 1942
- Commissioned: 14 August 1942
- Motto: Felix oportunitate pugnae; "Happy at the chance of a fight" or "Fortunate in the timeliness of her fight"
- Honours and awards: Arctic (1942-45); North Africa (1942); Atlantic (1943); North Cape (1943); Normandy (1944)
- Fate: Scrapped on 25 November 1955
- Badge: On a Field Blue, an hour glass Gold.

General characteristics
- Class & type: O-class destroyer
- Displacement: 1,610 long tons (1,640 t) (standard)
- Length: 345 ft (105.2 m) (o/a)
- Beam: 35 ft (10.7 m)
- Draught: 13 ft 6 in (4.1 m)
- Installed power: 2 × Admiralty 3-drum boilers; 40,000 shp (29,828 kW)
- Propulsion: 2 × shafts; 2 × geared steam turbines
- Speed: 37 knots (69 km/h; 43 mph)
- Range: 3,850 nmi (7,130 km; 4,430 mi) at 20 knots (37 km/h; 23 mph)
- Complement: 176+
- Armament: 4 × single QF 4 in (102 mm) AA gun; 1 × quad 2 pdr (40 mm (1.6 in)) AA gun; 4 × single 20 mm (0.8 in) AA guns; 2 × quadruple 21 in (533 mm) torpedo tubes; 2 × depth charges throwers; 60 × mines

HMS Opportune was an O-class destroyer of the Royal Navy. She was ordered from John I. Thornycroft & Company, Woolston on 3 September 1939 for the 1st Emergency Flotilla. She was commissioned on 14 August 1942. She was the second Royal Navy ship borne Opportune.

She served throughout the Second World War, mainly as an escort ship for convoys, and remained with the Royal Navy until the mid-1950s.

== Service history ==
=== Convoy Duty 1942 ===
Enemy action affected Opportune before she was even completed, as German bombing in 1940 severely damaged the shipyard and enemy action delayed the delivery of components. It was for these reasons that her completion was delayed until 1942.

When she was eventually launched, she was with the 17th Destroyer Flotilla with the Home Fleet. During trials, she assisted in escorting convoy PW-202 to Bristol.

Her first real duty was escorting the Arctic convoy PQ-18 to the Russian port at Murmansk. On 20 September, she was required to assist the destroyer Somali which had been torpedoed by the German U-boat U-703. Although the stricken ship was already being assisted by Ashanti, and although destroyers Eskimo, Intrepid and the naval trawler Lord Middleton were also on hand to assist the ship, the gales and rough seas proved too much for her and she sank on 24 September. Opportune helped transport some of Somali's survivors to Scapa Flow.

=== Operation Torch ===
In October 1942, Opportune escorted Fleet Admiral Sir Andrew Cunningham on board the cruiser Scylla to Gibraltar in preparation for Operation Torch, the invasion of North Africa. In preparation for the landings, she carried out three days of anti-submarine patrols in the Mediterranean Sea. On the day of the invasion itself, she was deployed as the escort for part of Force H and supported their role in the operation.

After ten days, she returned to Home Waters, escorting the battleship Duke of York and aircraft carrier Victorious to Scapa Flow. En route, Fairey Swordfish and Albacore aircraft from the carrier Victorious attacked the U-boat U-517. It was damaged and forced to surface, upon which its crew were taken prisoner by Opportune. The U-boat later sank, while 52 survivors of the 53-strong crew were taken to Greenock for transport to a prisoner-of-war camp.

=== Convoy Duty 1943 ===
She resumed her Arctic convoy escort role after arriving at Scapa Flow and continued in this capacity from December 1942 through to March 1943. During this period, she escorted convoy JW 53 through extremely tough weather and earned salvage money when she rescued the stricken merchantman John H. B. Latrobe from a German minefield.

In March, Opportune was assigned to the 5th Support Group for Atlantic convoy defence. Just over a month after being reassigned, on 25 April, she helped sink the U-boat U-203 with the destroyer Pathfinder and aircraft from the carrier Biter. On 12 May, she once again attacked a U-boat, this time U-456 which was never seen again and is presumed to have been sunk. She continued in the Atlantic convoy defence duties as well as fleet duties in the Northwest Approaches for some months. On 14 September, this included escorting the Prime Minister to Canada for the Québec Conference of 1943.

In October 1943, Opportune was part of Operation Leader, escorting several Royal Navy ships and the US aircraft carrier USS Ranger in attacks on German positions in Bodø, Norway.

=== Sinking Scharnhorst ===
"Gentlemen, I hope that if any of you are ever called upon to lead a ship into action against an opponent many times superior, you will command your ship as gallantly as Scharnhorst was commanded to-day"

Admiral Fraser, after his victory in the Battle of North Cape.

In December, she was once again escorting convoys to the Soviet Union through the long Arctic nights. When, on 25 December, the German battleship Scharnhorst was reported to be hunting convoy JW 55B, Opportune was deployed to join the battle. She was present at the Battle of North Cape, when Scharnhorst came under repeated fire from numerous Royal Navy warships. The German ship proved a tough opponent, and although she was outnumbered, outgunned and blinded by a direct hit to her radar, she managed to elude her pursuers for many hours. Most of the British capital ships had fired all of their torpedoes so the destroyers Opportune, Musketeer, Virago and Matchless closed in and fired a total of nineteen torpedoes at Scharnhorst, scoring six hits. The ship finally keeled over and sank. The relentlessness of Scharnhorst's fight was noted and respected by the victorious British commanding officers.

=== Normandy Landings ===
In the new year, she was once again in Arctic convoy escort duty until March, when she was deployed in counter E-boat operations in preparation for the Normandy Landings, which would take place a few months later. She still escorted Arctic convoys, but she was being prepared for the invasion. In April, when she was recalled for a boiler clean and minor re-fit, she was permanently assigned to Task Force 27 in the English Channel.

During a disastrous full scale rehearsal of the Utah Beach landing on 28 April, Opportune engaged German E-boats which had sighted and engaged eight US landing craft on their way to the Slapton Sands. The E-boats escaped after deploying a smokescreen, but over 638 US servicemen were killed in their attack. Many casualties were US Army personnel who were not properly trained and had difficulties with the life-jackets and other equipment, and drowned whilst awaiting rescue. The disaster nearly caused D-day itself to be cancelled, as it was thought some ten soldiers with full knowledge of the operation could have been captured by the Germans, it was only the subsequent discovery of their bodies which saved the operation.

The actual landings on 6 June were much less eventful. Opportune patrolled in the eastern stretches of the English Channel, guarding against a German naval attack. She didn't encounter a single hostile boat, although she did engage E-boats in July and August, while supporting operations in France.

=== Convoy Duty 1944 & 45 ===
After the successful invasion of Normandy, Opportune was once again deployed to convoy defence in the Arctic and minelaying roles. She was occasionally deployed with Force 3 in operations off Norway. These duties continued into 1945 and through to the end of the war.

=== Postwar career ===
Opportune remained in service after VJ Day and deployed at Portsmouth for submarine training and Local Flotilla duties until 1950. She then refitted and joined the Nore Local Flotilla. The ship was placed in Reserve at Chatham Dockyard in November 1952. Transferred to Portsmouth in July 1953 she went on the Disposal List the next year. After sale to BISCO in November 1955 she arrived in tow at Milford Haven on 25 November to be broken-up by Thos. W. Ward.

== Publications ==
- Colledge, J. J.; Warlow, Ben (2006) [1969]. Ships of the Royal Navy: The Complete Record of All Fighting Ships of the Royal Navy from the 15th Century to the Present (3rd Rev ed.). London: Chatham Publishing. ISBN 978-1-86176-281-8. OCLC 67375475.
- Connell, G. G. (1982). Arctic Destroyers: The 17th Flotilla. London: William Kimber. ISBN 0-7183-0428-4.
- English, John (2001). Obdurate to Daring: British Fleet Destroyers 1941–45. Windsor, UK: World Ship Society. ISBN 978-0-9560769-0-8.
- Friedman, Norman (2006). British Destroyers & Frigates: The Second World War and After. Annapolis, Maryland: Naval Institute Press. ISBN 1-86176-137-6.
- Lenton, H. T. (1998). British & Empire Warships of the Second World War. Annapolis, Maryland: Naval Institute Press. ISBN 1-55750-048-7.
- Raven, Alan; Roberts, John (1978). War Built Destroyers O to Z Classes. London: Bivouac Books. ISBN 0-85680-010-4.
- Rohwer, Jürgen (2005). Chronology of the War at Sea 1939–1945: The Naval History of World War Two (Third Revised ed.). Annapolis, Maryland: Naval Institute Press. ISBN 1-59114-119-2.
- Whitley, M. J. (1988). Destroyers of World War Two: An International Encyclopedia. Annapolis, Maryland: Naval Institute Press. ISBN 0-87021-326-1.
