= Mrs. Alexander Fraser =

British romance writer

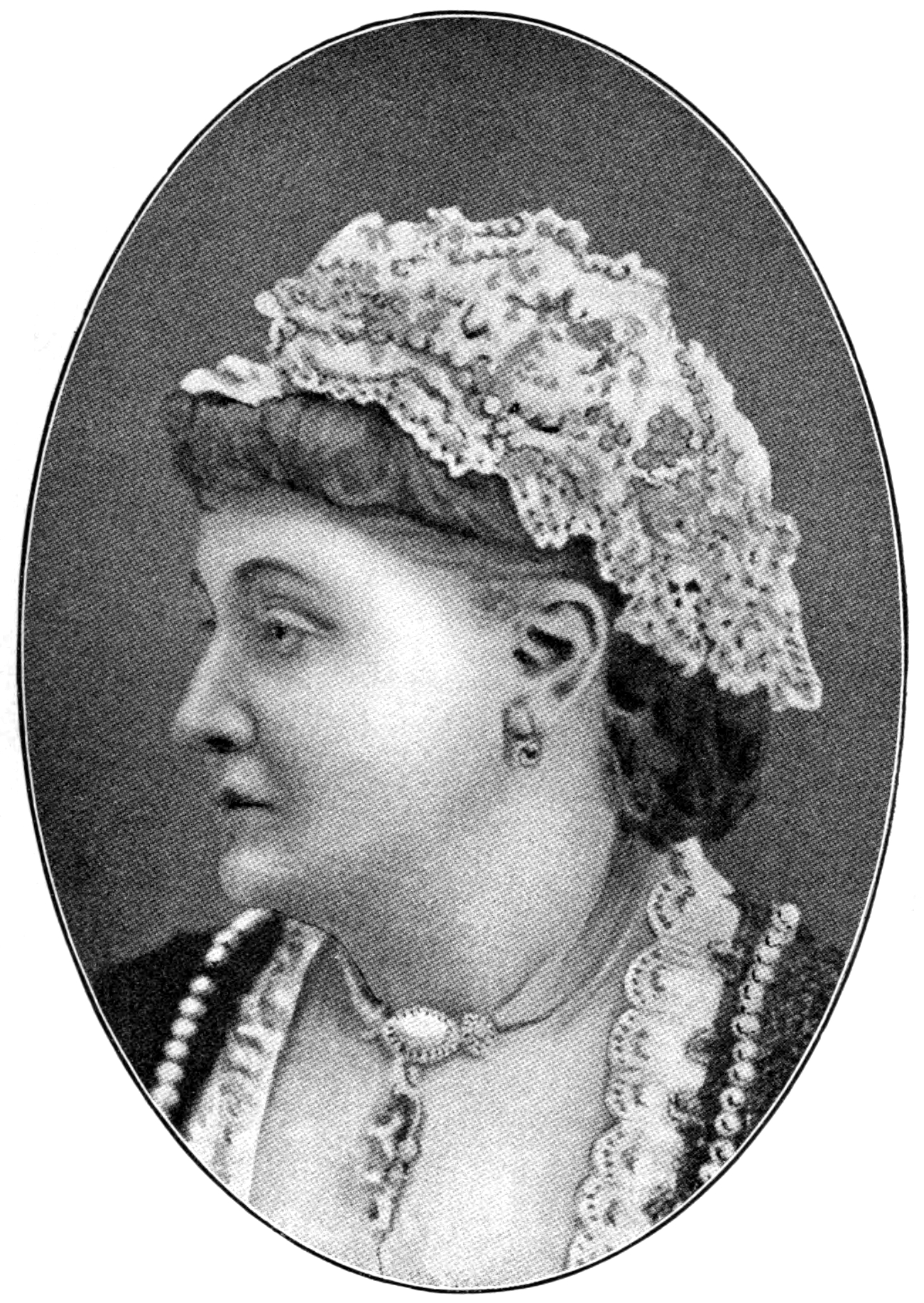
Mrs. Alexander Fraser

Caroline Rosetta Fraser (née Small; 10 February 1829 – 1908), better known by the pen name Mrs. Alexander Fraser, was a romance writer of the Victorian era and the estranged wife of General Alexander Fraser (1824–1898).

== Biography ==
Caroline Rosetta Small was born in British-occupied India on 10 February 1829 to English parents, Beaumont Dixie Small and Caroline Honora Pereira. Her birthplace was in the Lahore District of modern-day Pakistan. Her father, an assistant surgeon with the East India Company's Bengal Light Infantry, died unexpectedly in 1831. Caroline's mother later married James Frushard on 1 March 1834.

With the exception of two years spent studying in Paris, Fraser spent most of her youth in India. On 11 March 1847, she married Alexander Fraser, at the time a lieutenant in the Bengal Engineer Group. Alexander Fraser went on to have a long career as a civil engineer building numerous railroads and lighthouses throughout India. The couple had two sons, Alexander Bruce Siddons Fraser (1848–1933) and Campbell Edward Fraser (1850–1926), both born in India.

Fraser's writing career appears to have coincided with the breakdown of her marriage. By the 1871 British Census, Fraser was living alone with her widowed mother and sons in England. English civil records indicate that Fraser applied unsuccessfully for a legal separation in 1867 and again in 1885. General Fraser returned to England, living independently with a second family, which included son Bruce Austin Fraser (later 1st Baron Fraser of North Cape) (1888–1981).

Although some sources say Fraser died in Steyning, Sussex, England in 1908, records connected with her burial in All Saints churchyard, Patcham place her death at Withdean, Brighton on 8 December 1908.

== Selected works ==
- Faithless
- Not While She Lives (1870)
- Denison's Wife (1872)
- Guardian and Lover (1876)
- Her Plighted Troth (1876)
- A Thing of Beauty (1877)
- A Maddening Blow (1878)
- A Fatal Passion (1879)
- False Hearts and True (1879)
- Her Deserts (1881)
- A Professional Beauty (1882)
- A Fashionable Marriage (1883)
- Guardian and Lover (1883)
- A Peeress of 1882, and Other Stories (1883)
- Only A Face, and Other Tales (1883)
- The Match of the Season (1885)
- The Last Drawing Room (1886)
- A Leader of Society (1887)
- Daughters of Belgravia (1887)
- She Came Between: A Love Story (1887)
- A Leader in Society (1887)
- Purple and Fine Linen (1889)
- Lady Claud (1889)
- The New Duchess (1890)
- A Modern Bridegroom (1892)
- A Mayfair Tragedy (1894)
