= 1920 Royal Navy mission to Enzeli =

The 1920 Royal Navy Mission to Enzeli was a party of thirty-one officers and men of the United Kingdom's Royal Navy sent to Enzeli, North Persia, to assist with White Russian interned ships. The mission was detained in Baku, Azerbaijan, following the latter's invasion by the Red Army and the subsequent change of government. The party was imprisoned for six months until released in a prisoner exchange.

== Background ==
From September 1918 to May 1919, Commodore David Norris RN had built up a flotilla of armed merchant cruisers (AMC) with which, by May 1919, he had wrested control of the Caspian Sea from the Soviet Navy. When Britain withdrew its forces from the area in August 1919, eight AMCs of the Caspian Flotilla were handed over to General Denikin's Volunteer Army. But in March 1920, advances by the Soviet Red Army threatened the flotilla's base of Petrovsk (now Makhachkala) and General Erdeli (whom Denikin had appointed Russian Governor of Dagestan) was compelled to evacuate his forces by sea. With no other safe port to go to, the flotilla sailed to Enzeli, on the North Persian coast, where a detachment of Norperforce was stationed under the command of General Bateman-Champain. The sudden arrival of fourteen ships (six AMCs and eight transports) on 22 March 1920, had caught both Champain and the Persian authorities unprepared. The Persians responded by interning all the ships and ordering that they be disarmed. Champain had no naval personnel in Norperforce, so he requested Royal Navy assistance. The request was granted by Admiral John de Robeck, the high commissioner at Constantinople, despite his misgivings. He had previously advised the Admiralty in January, about a proposed earlier mission, that it should not proceed unless Baku was re-occupied and the safety of the Batum-Baku railway assured. Nevertheless, a party of volunteers (five officers and twenty six ratings) was assembled from ships at Constantinople.

== The naval mission ==
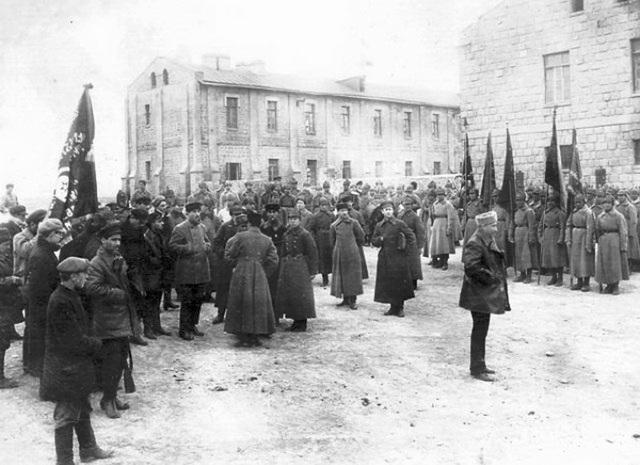
Red Army in Baku, Azerbaijan in May 1920

Led by Commander B.A. Fraser (later Admiral of the Fleet Lord Fraser of North Cape), the naval party assembled at HMS Julius, the harbour craft base at Constantinople. From its composition of a shipwright, blacksmith, ordnance artificers and engine room artificers, amongst others, it would appear that the party's purpose was the upkeep of the armed merchant cruisers, and possibly their disarmament; the small size of the party precluded any offensive intentions.

The party sailed from Constantinople in HMS Gardenia, across the Black Sea, arriving at the British-occupied Georgian port of Batum on 21 April, where they awaited further orders. After the arrival of de Robeck next day, and on receiving the report of Commander Luke (the chief commissioner at Tiflis), they were allowed to depart by train on 23 April. Their planned route was by train from Batum to Baku, Azerbaijan by way of Tiflis, Georgia, then by ship to Enzeli.

After a journey of four days, they arrived at Baku on 27 April at about 16.00, to be greeted with the news that the Bolshevik 11th Army had crossed the northern frontier of Azerbaijan at 01.00 that same morning. Owing to the general disorganisation at the station due to the need of many special trains, their train was stuck there for several hours waiting to proceed to the docks. Later that evening, a Red Army commissar appeared and said they were to consider themselves as prisoners.

== Imprisonment ==
The naval party was kept in the train under guard at the station for four days, until 1 May when a commissar came and said they were to be moved into the town. They were marched a mile to the Cheresvichaika where they were searched and everything taken away.

The next day, they were moved to Bailov Prison in southern Baku, where they were allotted three small cells, each about 10 feet square, each with a small window high up in the wall and little else. A fourth cell was used to accommodate other British civilian prisoners among whom was the British vice-consul, Theodore Hewelcke.

There were vermin everywhere, and by way of welcome a packet full of lice was pushed through the grating in the doors of the cells. Sanitary arrangements were practically non-existent, as there were only three filthy latrines for some 350 prisoners. The cells were only opened for half an hour each evening, when exercise was allowed in a small courtyard, in which there was a tap and trough - the only washing facilities provided. For the first two weeks the food consisted of one pound of black bread per head, with a little rice.

On 5 May, the Admiralty received the news that the naval party had been detained by the Bolsheviks at Baku.

=== Life in Bailov Prison ===
On 10 May Hewelcke was taken and transferred to the condemned cell, waiting to be shot. Twice during the night cars came to take them away, but each time the execution was postponed. Commander Fraser managed to persuade an interpreter to contact the Dutch Consul, and requested him to look after the safety of Hewelcke and to supply the party with food.

After several days in the condemned cell, on 16 May, Hewelcke was taken ill and removed to the prison hospital which had no medicines, nurses or bedding, except what the patients could provide themselves. The food supplied was exactly similar to that given to the remainder of the prisoners.

In the meantime, the Dutch consul had arranged for a Mr. Seaman (one of the few British citizens who had not been arrested) to send in meals for the whole party each day. From about 18 May onwards, the prison regulations were gradually relaxed, until they were allowed in the courtyard from 08.30 until 19.00 each day.

The condemned cell was next to one in which the naval prisoners were held and, at the beginning of June, executions began. Each night, at about 23.00, prisoners from the condemned cell were taken out into the courtyard and shot against the wall underneath the barred window of one of the naval cells.

=== Living together ===
In one cell there were the five officers and five men; the officers taught the men bridge, and the men taught the officers solo whist. Cards were forbidden, but they managed to play in the evenings by leaving a man standing by the door so that the peephole was covered. Later, when released, each man in the cell kept one card as a souvenir, signed on the back by all the others. On St. George's Day, red, white and blue rosettes were made from a signalman's flag. They were questioned about it by the prison authorities, who said no more about it when told it was being done in celebration their national day.

Clothing was maintained by a system of borrowing and lending. Most of the sailors had kept their 'housewives' (sewing and repair kits); so when part of one person's trousers required mending, another would cut off the bottom of his, which was then used to patch the worn trousers. Some had also managed to keep a razor, despite the many searches, so that they were able to shave, but most had to grow beards. Knives were confiscated and replaced with wooden spoons. Their bread ration, which was as hard as a brick, had to be broken by hand as best they could. After protests, a knife would be allowed for a few days, then it would be taken away again.

=== Health ===
There were several cases of jaundice and many suffered from boils. Most of the party were suffering from stomach troubles, and the remainder from malaria; but nothing could he done for them as no medicines were available, except to make them comfortable. Their sickberth steward acted as doctor for the party, but with little equipment, he was forced to improvise. He used the blade of a safety razor for minor surgical operations, and extracted teeth with a pair of wire nippers.

=== Move to a disused school ===
In August they were moved from Bailov prison to a disused school which was in a state of disrepair. They were still given only prison rations of 1 lb. of black bread per day; everything else they had to buy for themselves, which they were able to do as the Royal Navy had sent money to them in July.

== Negotiations ==
In the meantime, the efforts of the British Government to have the prisoners released were directed mainly at the Soviet trade delegation in London. Despite British support for the White Russians against them, the Soviets were desperate to acquire much needed goods and, pragmatically, put their animosity towards Britain to one side for the duration, and negotiations began in early June. The Soviets wanted finished goods such as mining gear, machine tools, electric plant, medical appliances and drugs, agricultural machinery, locomotives and railway material, and in exchange, were offering mainly raw materials such as cereals, oil, timber, minerals, etc. On 6 July, it was stated in Parliament "that it has been made clear to the Soviet trade delegation that until the release of all British prisoners in Russia takes place, no trade will be permitted between Russia and the United Kingdom."

From its North Russia intervention, Britain had retained about 100 Soviet prisoners, who were taken to Britain to be held as hostages, and were offered, with other prisoners held in Egypt and elsewhere, in exchange for all British prisoners held in Russia. The Soviet delegation accepted the principle of a prisoner exchange, but its leader, Krassin, said that the prisoners held in Baku were not their responsibility, but that of the Azerbaijan government (knowing full well the Soviet 11th Army occupied Azerbaijan, and its government would do whatever the Soviets told them).

As a result of this pressure, the prisoner's conditions began to improve while negotiations continued. But diplomatic wheels turn slowly, and it wasn't until 13 October that a note was received from the Soviet Government stating that the evacuation of all British subjects is to be carried out without delay in exchange for the Russians in Great Britain, Egypt, and elsewhere, who wish to return to Soviet Russia. It was finally agreed that 300 Russian prisoners from Egypt and Constantinople would be exchanged for all the British prisoners held in Baku. On 31 October, a telegram was received from the President of the Government of Azerbaijan:

Herewith I beg to notify you that on 28 October the former British Consul in Baku and all the British prisoners were released from prison. They will be sent to Tiflis, where-to the people's commissary for Foreign Affairs of the Azerbaijan Republic has departed, there personally to negotiate the details of the transfer of the prisoners.

== Release ==
On 4 November, the naval party was told to prepare to travel to Tiflis. At 16.00 the next day, sixty one British prisoners boarded the train to Tiflis. They reached Akstafa, a small town five miles from the frontier at 14.00 on the 6th, and waited for a day amidst snow and bad weather, during which time the remainder of their gear was searched again.

Before allowing the train to proceed to Tiflis, the Georgian Government, who were acting as intermediaries, were waiting for confirmation that the 300 Russian exchange prisoners from Egypt and Constantinople had arrived at the Black Sea port of Odessa, Ukraine. Finally, they were allowed to proceed and crossed the frontier at 17.00 on 7 November, arriving at Tiflis the next day, all in good health.

From Tiflis they travelled on to Batum, then sailed first to Constantinople then, on 12 November, departed Constantinople in HMS Heliotrope calling in at Malta where one man was detained in hospital while the others continued on board. The naval party arrived at Portsmouth on 1 December where they were greeted on the quayside by Commander Fraser who had arrived five days earlier, having travelled on ahead to report to the Admiralty.

Twenty four years later, Admiral Fraser, as commander-in-chief of the Home Fleet, was awarded the Order of Suvorov 1st Class by the Soviet Union for his part in the sinking of the Scharnhorst in the Battle of the North Cape.

== The naval party ==
=== Officers ===
- Commander B.A. Fraser,
- Lieutenant W.A.A. Bolitho,
- Sub-Lieutenant J.G.Henderson,
- Sub-Lieutenant H.S.Keighley,
- Commissioned Gunner Richard Norman

=== Ratings ===
- Aspell, Robert Clyde, Leading Seaman, J.10797 (Devonport).
- Banks, Joseph William, Blacksmith (4th Class), M.21903 (Dev.).
- Collins, Henry Charles Dunk, Acting Shipwright (4th Class), M.6432 (Chatham).
- Dart, William Henry, Able Seaman, J.30784 (Ch.).
- Greenway, John Alexander, Signalman, J.41326 (Dev.).
- Grocott, James, Able Seaman, J.37815 (Portsmouth).
- Grundy, Walter Herbert, Engine Room Artificer (3rd Class), M.6702 (Dev.).
- Hine, Mark, Leading Telegraphist,. J.30143 (Dev.).
- Horgan, John, Petty Officer, 194216 (Po.).
- Hutchings, William Alfred, Leading Signalman, J.22516 (Po.).
- Marsh, Joseph Thomas Colville, Engine Room Artificer (4th Class), M.28655 (Ch.).
- Murray, Cecil Lionel, Telegraphist, J.59108 (Po.).
- Newland, Henry Herbert, Petty Officer, 193438 (Ch.) (R.F.R., B.8441).
- Pettit, Frederick Edwin, Ordnance Artificer (3rd Class), M.10410 (Ch.).
- Phillips, William George, Ordnance Artificer (3rd Class), M.14781 (Ch.).
- Piggott, Stanley Freeman, Leading Seaman, J.15784 (Po.).
- Prout, Frederick Colling, 2nd Sick Berth Steward, M.3176 (Dev.).
- Roche, Allen, Armourer, 345902 (Dev.).
- Smith, William Stanley, Able Seaman, J.38025 (Ch.).
- Snow, Frank Ernest, Private, R.M.L.I., Ply./15808.
- Spurway, William Henry James, Leading Seaman, J.19585 (Ch.).
- Vidler, Thomas, Leading Seaman, J.18419 (Po.).
- Wainwright, Wilfred, Able Seaman, J.38861 (Po.).
- Ware, William Thomas, Leading Seaman, J.16472 (Dev,).
- Waterfield, James William, Gunner, R.M.A., R.M.A./11983.
- Wright, Albert Edward, Officers' Steward (3rd Class), L.12292.
