= Alexander Fraser (British Army officer, born 1824) =

General Alexander Fraser CB
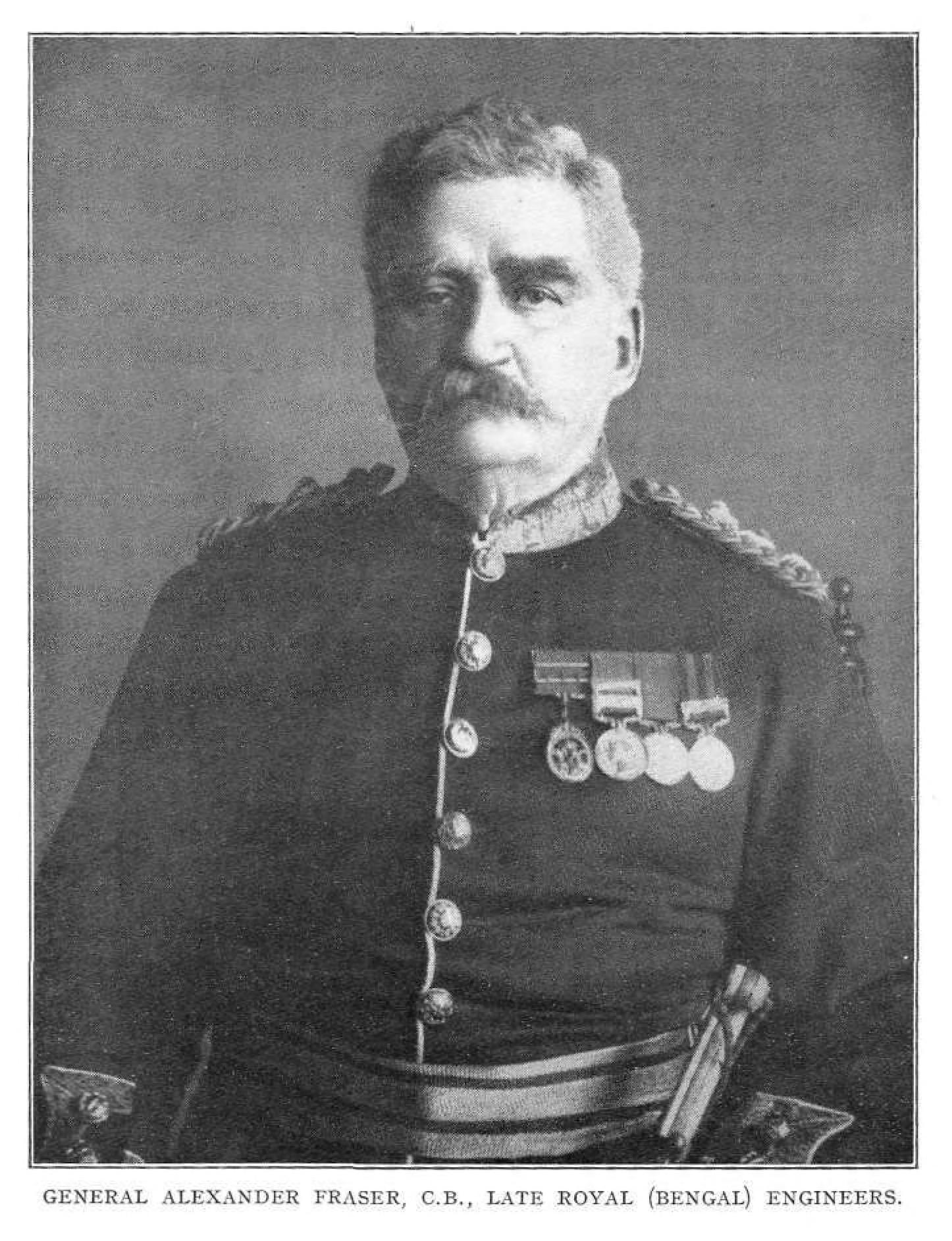
- Born: 8 May 1824; Prestbury, Gloucestershire
- Died: 10 June 1898 (aged 74); Rochford, Essex
- Relatives: Caroline Fraser (wife); Bruce Fraser, 1st Baron Fraser of North Cape (son)
- Military career
- Allegiance: United Kingdom
- Branch: British Army
- Service years: 1843–1886
- Rank: General
- Conflicts: First Anglo-Sikh War; Second Anglo-Burmese War
- Awards: Companion of the Order of the Bath

General Alexander Fraser, CB (8 May 1824 – 10 June 1898) was a British Army officer in the Royal (Bengal) Engineers, who served in India and Burma. He was especially well known for the construction of the Alguada Reef Lighthouse in Burma in 1865.

== Early life and career ==
Son of James Fraser, he was born in Prestbury, Gloucestershire on 8 May 1824 and was educated at Kings College and Addiscombe before joining the Bengal Engineers in 1843. He saw action in the Sutlej Campaign in 1845–46, in the Punjab in 1848–49 and during the Second Anglo-Burmese War in 1852–53 under General Scudamore Winde Steel. He worked on the construction of lighthouses on the Burmese coast and served as chief engineer in the Northwest Provinces. He also worked with the Indian Railways serving as Chairman of the Railways of the Nizam, Rohilkund and Kumaon. He was created a Companion of the Order of the Bath in 1880.

== Alguada Reef Lighthouse ==
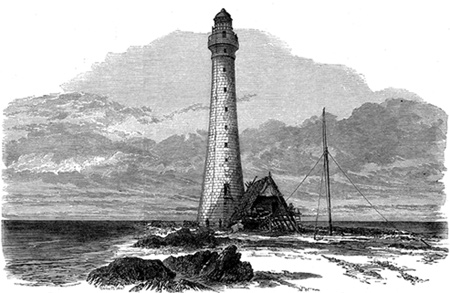
The Alguada Reef Lighthouse, south of Cape Negrais, on the coast of Pegu, Illustrated London News 21 October 1865 (15.7167°N 94.2°E)

Fraser examined the Alguada Reef in December 1856 on the orders of Lord Canning after 286 people were killed in a shipwreck. The original proposal for a lighthouse had been raised by the Marquis of Dalhousie. After examining the tides and the land, a site was identified for the construction. The Admiral Sir Fleetwood Pellew suggested that the light house be built of iron while Captain Rogers suggested a struction resting on a substantial platform. Alan Stevenson suggested that iron would not work in such an exposed condition and it was decided that it would be built of stone. It was modelled after Skerryvore and with a Catoptric light. Stones were brought from Singapore and work began in 1860. The holophotal light on the tower was lit on 23 April 1865 and was 144 feet above the high-water mark and visible from 20 nautical miles.

== Personal life ==
In 1846, Fraser married Caroline Rosetta daughter of Beaumont Dixie Small, a surgeon in the Bengal Medical Service, at Madras. They had two sons Alexander (born 1848) and Campbell (born 1850), both of whom joined the British Army. In 1860 they separated but were not legally divorced and Caroline returned to England, where she became a novelist. Fraser retired in 1886 and then lived with Monica Stores Smith and they had two sons, one of them being Bruce Austin Fraser who became a celebrated admiral in the Royal Navy. He died at Rochford, Essex and is buried in St. Margaret's Churchyard, Downham.
