= Operation Ostfront =

1943 German WWII naval sortie

Unternehmen Ostfront
- Operational scope: Naval sortie by Scharnhorst and destroyer flotilla
- Planned by: Kriegsmarine
- Objective: Destruction of the Arctic Convoy JW 55B
- Date: Began 25 December 1943
- Executed by: Naval Group North

Operation Ostfront (Unternehmen Ostfront, Eastern Front) was a sortie into the Arctic Ocean by the German battleship Scharnhorst during the Second World War. The operation culminated in the sinking of Scharnhorst at the Battle of North Cape.

== Background ==
=== Lend-lease ===
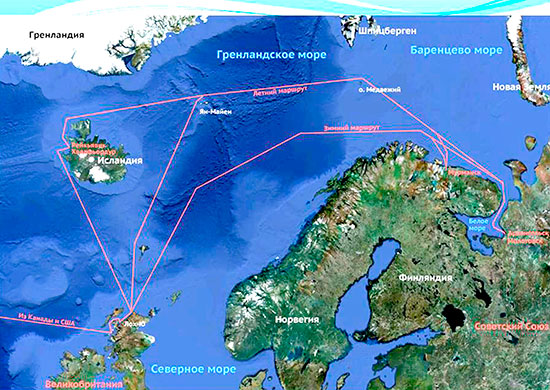
Russian map showing Arctic convoy routes from Britain and Iceland, past Norway to the Barents Sea and northern Russian ports

After Operation Barbarossa, the German invasion of the USSR, began on 22 June 1941, the UK and USSR signed an agreement in July that they would "render each other assistance and support of all kinds in the present war against Hitlerite Germany". Before September 1941 the British had dispatched 450 aircraft, 22,000 long tons (22,000 t) of rubber, 3,000,000 pairs of boots and stocks of tin, aluminium, jute, lead and wool. In September British and US representatives travelled to Moscow to study Soviet requirements and their ability to meet them. The representatives of the three countries drew up a protocol in October 1941 to last until June 1942 and to agree new protocols to operate from 1 July to 30 June of each following year until the end of Lend-Lease. The protocol listed supplies, monthly rates of delivery and totals for the period.

The supplies to be sent were specified but not the ships to move them. The USSR turned out to lack the ships and escorts and the British and Americans, who had made a commitment to "help with the delivery", undertook to deliver the supplies for want of an alternative. The main Soviet need in 1941 was military equipment to replace losses because, at the time of the negotiations, two large aircraft factories were being moved east from Leningrad and two more from Ukraine. It would take at least eight months to resume production, until when, aircraft output would fall from 80 to 30 aircraft per day. Britain and the US undertook to send 400 aircraft a month, at a ratio of three bombers to one fighter (later reversed) 500 tanks a month and 300 Bren gun carriers. The Anglo-Americans also undertook to send 42,000 long tons (43,000 t) of aluminium and 3,862 machine tools, with sundry raw materials, food and medical supplies.

=== Arctic convoys, 1943 ===
In October 1943, the commander in chief of the Kriegsmarine, Grand Admiral Karl Dönitz, ordered the operations division of the Seekriegsleitung (SKL, Naval Warfare Command) to plan a sortie by Scharnhorst and destroyer escorts to intercept Arctic convoys when they started again. The SKL stressed that the northern force was an anti-invasion force, conforming to Führer Directive 51 of 3 November, that ordered a strategic defensive in the West. The decision to send Scharnhorst on a sorties was reserved to Dönitz and Otto Schniewind, the commander of Naval Group North (Marinegruppenkommando Nord). In early December, despite the dismal results of Operation Regenbogen, SKL decided that a sorties during the dark period of the polar year, good results could be obtained from a sortie and that sending destroyers only would court all the risks without the prospect of good results. Only five destroyers of the 4th Destroyer Flotilla remained in the north because the 6th Destroyer Flotilla had been transferred south.

== The Operation ==
In November 1943 the Arctic convoys resumed. On 19 December 1943, Dönitz submitted a request to Hitler to allow Scharnhorst to attack the next convoy sailing through the Barents Sea. On 25 December 1943 Dönitz ordered Ostfront to commence. Admiral Bruce Fraser, C-in-C of the Home Fleet, alerted by the Norwegian resistance of the possibility of an interception by Scharnhorst, prepared a trap. On 25 December Scharnhorst sailed to intercept the British convoy, Convoy JW 55B, believing it to be sparsely protected. In the ensuing Battle of the North Cape Scharnhorst was separated from her escorting destroyers and was sunk.

== Bibliography ==
- Boyd, Andrew (2024). Arms for Russia & the Naval War in the Arctic 1941–1945. Barnsley: Seaforth (Pen & Sword). ISBN 978-1-3990-3886-7.
- Hancock, W. K.; Gowing, M. M. (1949). Hancock, W. K. (ed.). British War Economy. History of the Second World War, United Kingdom Civil Series. London: HMSO. OCLC 630191560.
- Woodman, Richard (2004) [1994]. Arctic Convoys 1941–1945. London: John Murray. ISBN 978-0-7195-5752-1.
