= List of naval battles between battleships =

This is a list of naval battles in history where steel vessels rated as battleships and/or battlecruisers engaged each other in combat.

Date	Battles	Conflict	Combatants A	Combatants B	Result
8–9 February 1904	Battle of Port Arthur	Russo-Japanese War	Imperial Japanese Navy	Imperial Russian Navy	Indecisive
10 August 1904	Battle of the Yellow Sea	Russo-Japanese War	Imperial Japanese Navy	Imperial Russian Navy	Japanese victory
27–28 May 1905	Battle of Tsushima	Russo-Japanese War	Imperial Japanese Navy	Imperial Russian Navy	Japanese victory (Note: The first (and only) decisive battle fought between battleships.)
16 December 1912	Battle of Elli	First Balkan War	Royal Hellenic Navy	Ottoman Navy	Greek victory
18 January 1913	Battle of Lemnos	First Balkan War	Royal Hellenic Navy	Ottoman Navy	Greek victory
29 October 1914	Black Sea Raid	World War I	Ottoman Navy	Imperial Russian Navy	Ottoman Victory
18 November 1914	Battle of Cape Sarych	World War I	Ottoman Navy	Imperial Russian Navy	Indecisive
24 January 1915	Battle of Dogger Bank (1915)	World War I	Kaiserliche Marine	Royal Navy	British victory
10 May 1915	Action of 10 May 1915	World War I	Ottoman Navy	Imperial Russian Navy	Indecisive
8–19 August 1915	Battle of the Gulf of Riga	World War I	Kaiserliche Marine	Imperial Russian Navy	Russian victory
8 January 1916	Action of 8 January 1916	World War I	Ottoman Navy	Imperial Russian Navy	Indecisive
31 May – 1 June 1916	Battle of Jutland	World War I	Kaiserliche Marine	Royal Navy	British Strategic Victory/German Tactical Victory
16 October – 3 November 1917	Battle of Moon Sound	World War I	Kaiserliche Marine	Imperial Russian Navy	German victory
17 November 1917	Second Battle of Heligoland Bight	World War I	Kaiserliche Marine	Royal Navy	Indecisive
9 April 1940	Action off Lofoten	World War II	Royal Navy	Kriegsmarine	Indecisive
3 July 1940	Battle of Mers-el-Kébir	World War II	Royal Navy	Vichy French Navy	British victory
9 July 1940	Battle of Calabria	World War II	Royal Navy	Regia Marina	Indecisive
23–25 September 1940	Battle of Dakar	World War II	Royal Navy	Vichy French Navy	Vichy French victory
27 November 1940	Battle of Cape Spartivento	World War II	Royal Navy	Regia Marina	Indecisive
24 May 1941	Battle of the Denmark Strait	World War II	Royal Navy	Kriegsmarine	German victory
26–27 May 1941	Hunt for the Bismarck	World War II	Royal Navy	Kriegsmarine	British victory
8–16 November 1942	Battle of Casablanca	World War II	United States Navy	Vichy French Navy	American victory
14–15 November 1942	Second Battle of Guadalcanal	World War II	United States Navy	Imperial Japanese Navy	American victory
26 December 1943	Battle of North Cape	World War II	Royal Navy	Kriegsmarine	British victory
25 October 1944	Battle of Surigao Strait	World War II	United States Navy	Imperial Japanese Navy	American victory (Note: This was the final battle ever fought between battleships.)
