= Battle of the North Cape =

1943 naval battle during the Arctic campaign of WWII

- Part of World War II
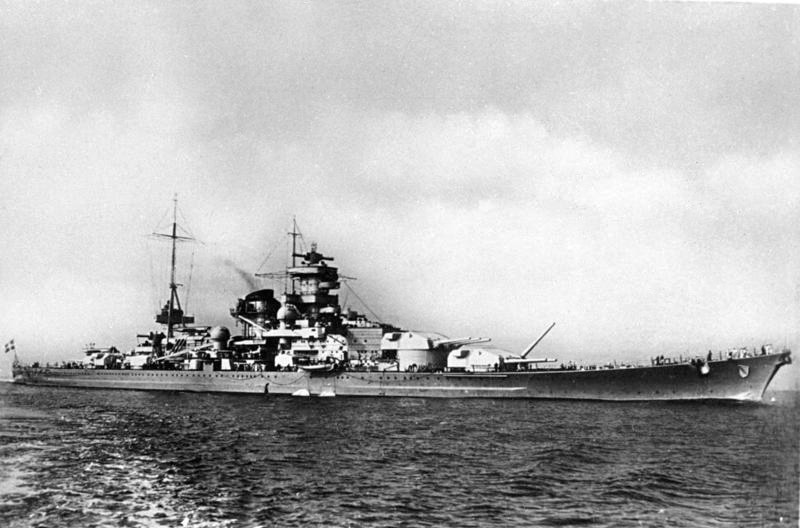
- German battleship Scharnhorst, c. 1939
Date	26 December 1943
Location	Off the North Cape, Barents Sea 72°31′N 28°15′E
Result	Allied victory

Belligerents
United Kingdom; Canada; Norway	Germany

Commanders and leaders
Bruce Fraser	Erich Bey †

Strength
1 battleship: Duke of York; 1 heavy cruiser: Norfolk; 3 light cruisers 8 destroyers	1 battleship: Scharnhorst; 5 destroyers

Casualties and losses
21 killed; 11 wounded; Duke of York slightly damaged; Norfolk damaged; Saumarez damaged	1,932 killed; 36 captured; Scharnhorst sunk

The Battle of the North Cape was a Second World War naval battle on 26 December 1943, part of the Arctic campaign. The German battleship Scharnhorst sailed to implement Operation Ostfront, an attack on Arctic convoys carrying supplies from the western Allies to the Soviet Union. Scharnhorst was brought to battle and sunk by the battleship HMS Duke of York and its cruisers and destroyers. The Norwegian destroyer HNoMS Stord played a notable part in the sinking. The result increased the British advantage in major surface units. The battle was the last between British and German big-gun capital ships. It was also the penultimate engagement between battleships in history, the last being the Battle of Surigao Strait in October 1944.

== Background ==
Since August 1941, the western Allies had run convoys of ships from the United Kingdom and Iceland to the northern ports of the Soviet Union to provide essential supplies for their war effort on the Eastern Front. These endured much hardship, frequently attacked by German naval and air forces stationed in occupied Norway. A key concern were German Kriegsmarine battleships such as Tirpitz and Scharnhorst. Even the threat of these ships' presence was enough to cause disastrous consequences for the convoys, such as Convoy PQ 17 that was scattered and mostly sunk by German forces after false reports of the Tirpitz sailing to intercept them. To ward off the threat of Germany's capital ships in the Arctic and to escort convoys with a high level of success, the Royal Navy had to outlay great assets.

Operation Ostfront was an attempt by the German Kriegsmarine to intercept the expected Arctic convoys. In late December 1943, there was a Russia-bound convoy JW 55B consisting of 19 cargo vessels under the command of the Commodore, retired Rear-Admiral Maitland Boucher, accompanied by a close escort of two destroyers, HMCS Huron and HMCS Haida, among others, and an ocean escort of eight Home Fleet destroyers led by HMS Onslow. Also in the area was convoy RA 55A, returning to the United Kingdom from Russia, consisting of 22 cargo ships, accompanied by a close escort of two destroyers and four other vessels, and an ocean escort of six Home Fleet destroyers led by HMS Milne. It had arrived safely at Murmansk with its normal escorts and the additional protection by Force 1, commanded by Vice Admiral Robert Burnett, consisting of the cruiser HMS Belfast, the flagship, and the cruisers HMS Norfolk and Sheffield.

Escorting the convoys to Russia was the responsibility of the Home Fleet and its commander-in-chief, Admiral Sir Bruce Fraser. Fraser wished to neutralise Scharnhorst, a major threat to the convoys, and planned a confrontation over Christmas 1943 in which convoy JW 55B would be used to draw out the enemy. Fraser expected and hoped that Scharnhorst would attempt to attack JW 55B. At a conference of the captains of the ships in his force Fraser described his plan to intercept Scharnhorst at a position between the convoy and the enemy's Norwegian base. He would then approach the enemy to within 12,000 yd (11,000 m) in the Arctic night, illuminate Scharnhorst with a star shell, and open fire using fire-control radar.

Convoy JW 55B had left Loch Ewe on 20 December and was sighted two days later by a Luftwaffe aircraft which commenced shadowing. By 23 December it was clear to the British from intelligence reports that the convoy had been sighted and was being shadowed by enemy aircraft. Fraser then put to sea with Force 2 consisting of his flagship the battleship HMS Duke of York, the cruiser HMS Jamaica and S-class destroyers HMS Savage, Scorpion, Saumarez, and HNoMS Stord of the exiled Royal Norwegian Navy. Fraser was anxious not to discourage Scharnhorst from leaving its base, so did not approach before it was necessary to do so. As JW 55B and its escorts approached the area of greatest danger on the same day, the 23rd, travelling slowly eastward 250 mi (220 nmi; 400 km) off the coast of north Norway, Burnett and Force 1 set out westward from Murmansk while Fraser with Force 2 approached at moderate speed from the west. On 25 December, Scharnhorst (under Captain Fritz Hintze) with the Narvik-class destroyers Z29, Z30, Z33, Z34 and Z38 left Norway's Altafjord under the overall command of Konteradmiral Erich Bey. Scharnhorst set course for the convoy's reported position as a south-westerly gale developed.

== Battle ==
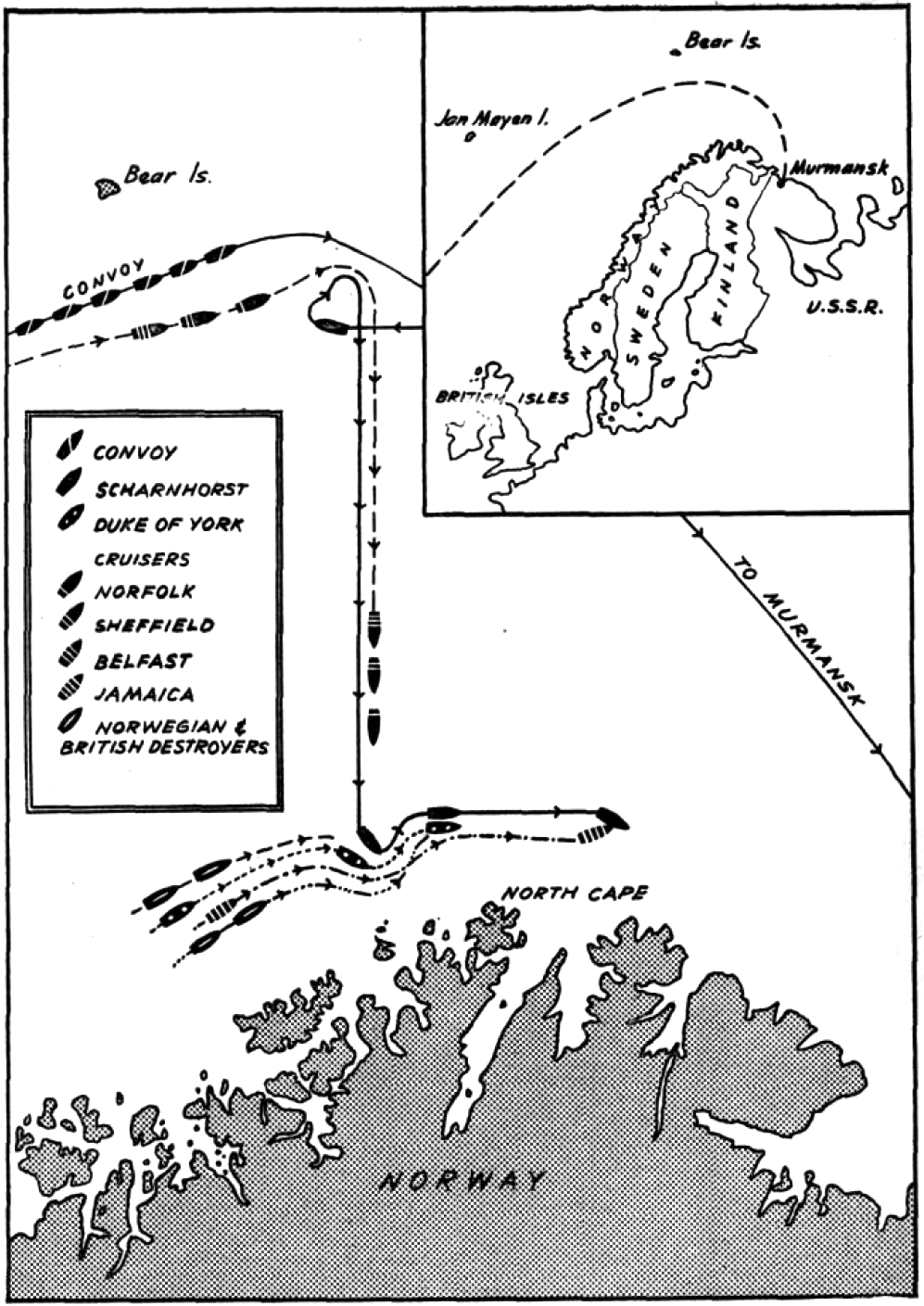
Contemporary map of the battle.

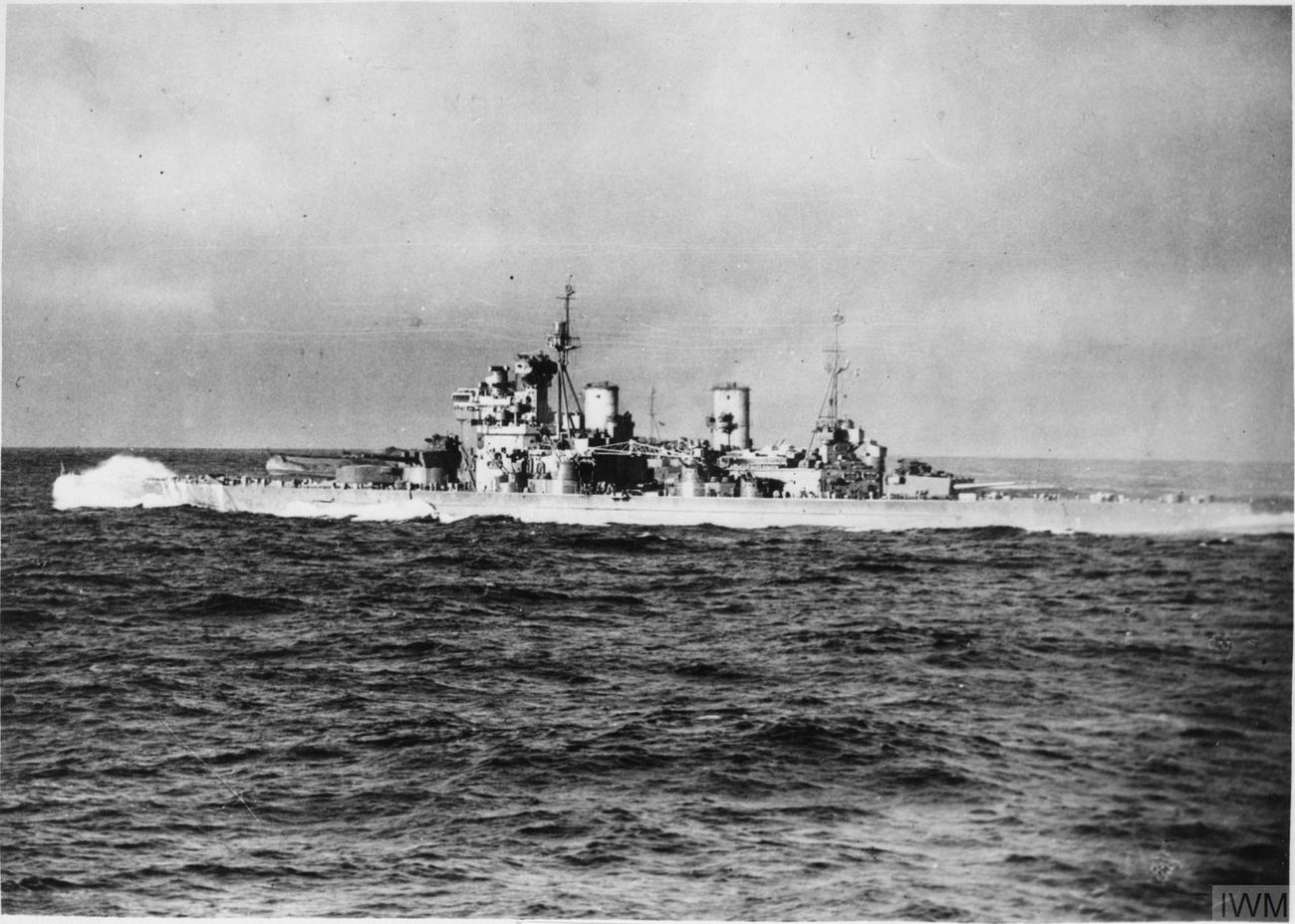
British battleship Duke of York

Fraser received confirmation from the Admiralty in the early hours of 26 December that Scharnhorst was at sea and searching for convoy JW 55B. The stormy weather had resulted in the grounding of all Luftwaffe reconnaissance planes. With no ability to search for the British ships from the air and heavy seas hampering the movement of his ships, Rear Admiral Bey was unable to locate the convoy. Despite a German U-boat spotting the convoy and reporting its position, Bey was still not able to make contact with the British ships. Thinking he had overshot the enemy, he detached his destroyers and sent them southward to increase the search area, and the destroyers subsequently lost contact with their flagship. Fraser, preparing for the German attack, had diverted the returning empty convoy RA 55A northward, out of the area in which it was expected, and ordered JW 55B to reverse course to allow him to close. He later ordered four of the destroyers with RA 55A; Matchless, Musketeer, Opportune and Virago, to detach and join him.

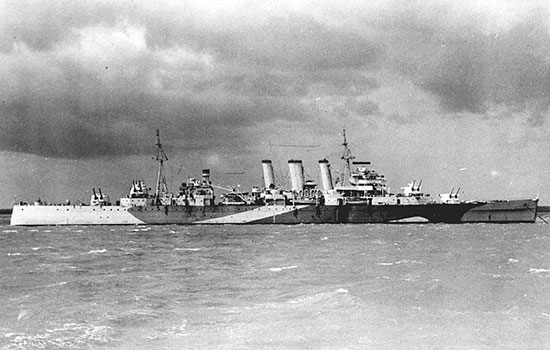
British heavy cruiser Norfolk

The unescorted Scharnhorst encountered Burnett's Force 1 shortly after 09:00. Belfast was the first ship to obtain radar contact on Scharnhorst, and the British cruisers rapidly closed the range. At a distance of nearly 13,000 yd (12,000 m), the British cruisers opened fire and Scharnhorst responded with her own salvoes. While no hits were scored on the British ships, the German battleship was struck twice, with one shell destroying the forward Seetakt radar controls and leaving Scharnhorst virtually blind in a mounting snowstorm. Without radar, gunners aboard the German battleship were forced to aim at the enemy's muzzle flashes. This was made more difficult because two of the British cruisers were using a new flashless propellant. Bey, believing he had engaged a battleship, turned south in an attempt to distance himself from the pursuers and perhaps draw them away from the convoy.

Scharnhorst's superior speed allowed Bey to shake off his pursuers, after which he turned northeast in an attempt to circle round them and attack the undefended convoy. Burnett, instead of giving chase in sea conditions that were limiting his cruisers' speed to 24 kn (44 km/h; 28 mph), correctly guessed Bey's intentions and positioned Force 1 so as to protect the convoy. It was a decision that he had some personal doubts about as it would result in the cruisers losing contact with Scharnhorst, and the decision was criticised by some of the British force's other officers but supported by Fraser. To Burnett's relief, shortly after noon, Scharnhorst was once again detected by the cruisers' radars as it attempted to approach the convoy. As fire was again exchanged, Scharnhorst scored two hits on Norfolk with 11-inch shells, disabling a turret and her radar. Burnett's destroyers were also unable to get close enough to Scharnhorst to launch a torpedo attack on the German ship. Following this exchange, Bey decided to return to port, while he ordered his destroyers to attack the convoy at a position reported by the U-boat earlier in the morning. The reported position was out of date, and the destroyers missed the convoy.

Scharnhorst ran south for several hours, once again taking advantage of its superior speed. Burnett pursued, but both Sheffield and Norfolk suffered engine problems and were forced to drop back, leaving the outgunned Belfast as the sole pursuer and dangerously exposed for a while. The lack of working radar aboard Scharnhorst prevented the Germans from taking advantage of the situation, allowing Belfast to reacquire the German ship on her radar set. Bey was unaware that his ship was now sailing into a trap, with Admiral Fraser's main force steaming towards Scharnhorst's position and perfectly placed to intercept the fleeing German ship. With Belfast sending a constant stream of radio signals on the Scharnhorst's position, the battleship Duke of York battled through the rough seas to reach the German ship. Fraser sent his four escorting destroyers to press ahead and try to get into torpedo-launching positions. The main British force soon picked up Scharnhorst on radar at 16:15 and were manoeuvring to bring a full broadside to bear. At 16:17 Scharnhorst was detected by Duke of York's Type 273 radar at a range of 45,500 yd (41,600 m) and by 16:32 Duke of York's Type 284 radar indicated that the range had closed to 29,700 yd (27,200 m).

At 16:48, Belfast fired star shells to illuminate Scharnhorst which was unprepared, with her turrets trained fore and aft, and clearly visible from Duke of York. Duke of York opened fire at a range of 11,920 yd (10,900 m) and scored a hit on the first salvo, disabling Scharnhorst's foremost turrets ("Anton" and "Bruno"), while another salvo destroyed the ship's aeroplane hangar. Bey turned north, but was engaged by the cruisers Norfolk and Belfast, and turned east at a high speed of 31 kn (36 mph; 57 km/h). Scharnhorst was now being engaged on one side by Duke of York and Jamaica while Burnett's cruisers engaged from the other side. The Germans took continuing heavy punishment from Duke of York's 14-inch shells, and at 17:24 a desperate Bey signalled to Germany "am surrounded by heavy units".

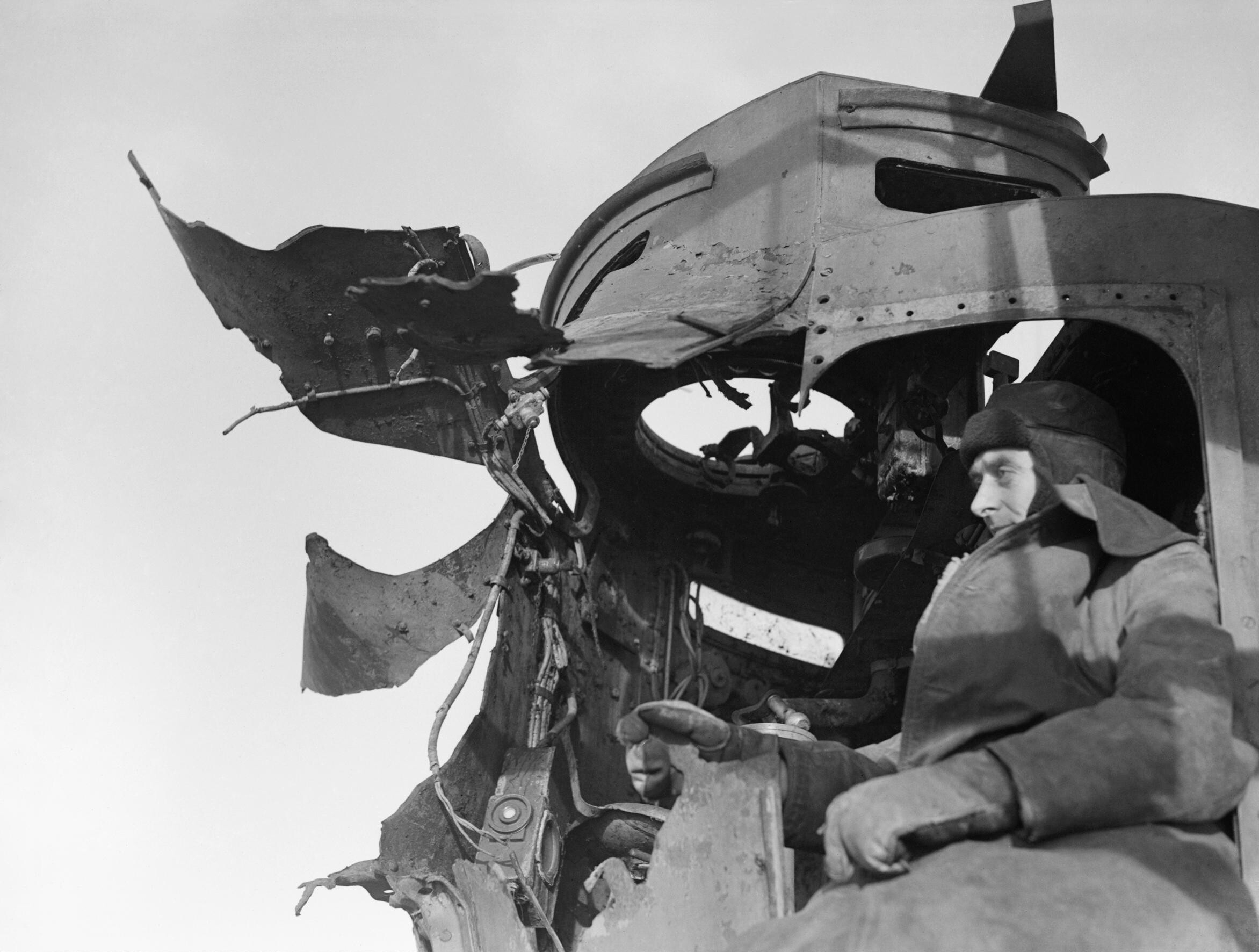
A close up view of the damage received by HMS Saumarez from an 11-inch shell fired by Scharnhorst during the battle

Bey was able to put some more distance between Scharnhorst and the British ships to increase his prospects of success. Two 11-inch shells from one of her salvoes damaged the foremast of the Duke of York, severing some of the wireless aerials and spraying the superstructure and the upper deck with splinters, and, more seriously still, knocking over the radar aerial to the Type 284 gunnery control radar set. These hits could not have been known to Bey, and Lt. Harold Bates, the electrical officer, despite the appalling conditions (a force 8 gale, darkness and substantial ice), climbed the mast, returned the aerial to the horizontal, and restarted the gyro-stabiliser so that within a few minutes the radar was working again. (After the battle, a myth arose that Bates had repaired the wires with his bare hands, leading to the nickname "Barehand" Bates.) Scharnhorst's fortunes took a dramatic turn for the worse at 18:20 when a shell fired by Duke of York at extreme range pierced her lower armour deck and destroyed the No. 1 boiler room. Scharnhorst's speed dropped to only 10 kn (12 mph; 19 km/h), and though immediate repair work allowed it to recover to 22 kn (25 mph; 41 km/h), Scharnhorst was now vulnerable to torpedo attacks by the destroyers. Five minutes later, Bey sent his final radio message to the German naval command: "We will fight on until the last shell is fired." At 18:50 Scharnhorst turned to starboard to engage the destroyers Savage and Saumarez, but this allowed Scorpion and the Norwegian destroyer Stord to attack with torpedoes, scoring two hits on the starboard side. As Scharnhorst continued to turn to avoid the torpedoes, Savage and Saumarez scored three hits on her port side. Saumarez was hit several times by Scharnhorst's secondary armament and suffered 11 killed and 11 wounded.

Due to the torpedo hits, Scharnhorst's speed again fell to 10 kn (12 mph; 19 km/h), allowing Duke of York to rapidly close the range. With Scharnhorst illuminated by star shells "hanging over her like a chandelier", Duke of York and Jamaica resumed fire, at a range of only 10,400 yd (9,500 m). At 19:15, Belfast joined in from the north. The British vessels subjected the German ship to a deluge of shells, and the cruisers Jamaica and Belfast fired their remaining torpedoes at the slowing target. Scharnhorst's end came when the British destroyers Opportune, Virago, Musketeer and Matchless fired a further 19 torpedoes at her. Wracked with hits and unable to flee, Scharnhorst finally capsized and sank at 19:45 on 26 December, her propellers still turning, at an estimated position of 72°16′N 28°41′E. She was later identified and filmed at 72°31′N 28°15′E. Of her total complement of 1,968, only 36 were pulled from the frigid waters, 30 by Scorpion and six by Matchless. Neither Rear Admiral Bey nor Captain Hintze were among those rescued (although both were reported seen in the water after the ship sank), nor were any other officers. British casualties, in contrast, were relatively light with only 21 killed and 11 wounded. The majority of British casualties occurred on Saumarez, with 11 of the destroyer's sailors being killed as the ship attempted to close with Scharnhorst. HMS Norfolk suffered most of the remaining casualties with seven of her men being killed while the destroyer Scorpion also had one of its men missing in action. The Norwegian destroyer Stord also suffered losses when the rough sea washed two men over board during the chase; one was washed back onto the ship by another wave, and wounded, while the other was lost at sea. Fraser ordered the force to proceed to Murmansk, making a signal to the Admiralty: "Scharnhorst sunk", to which the reply came: "Grand, well done."

== Aftermath ==
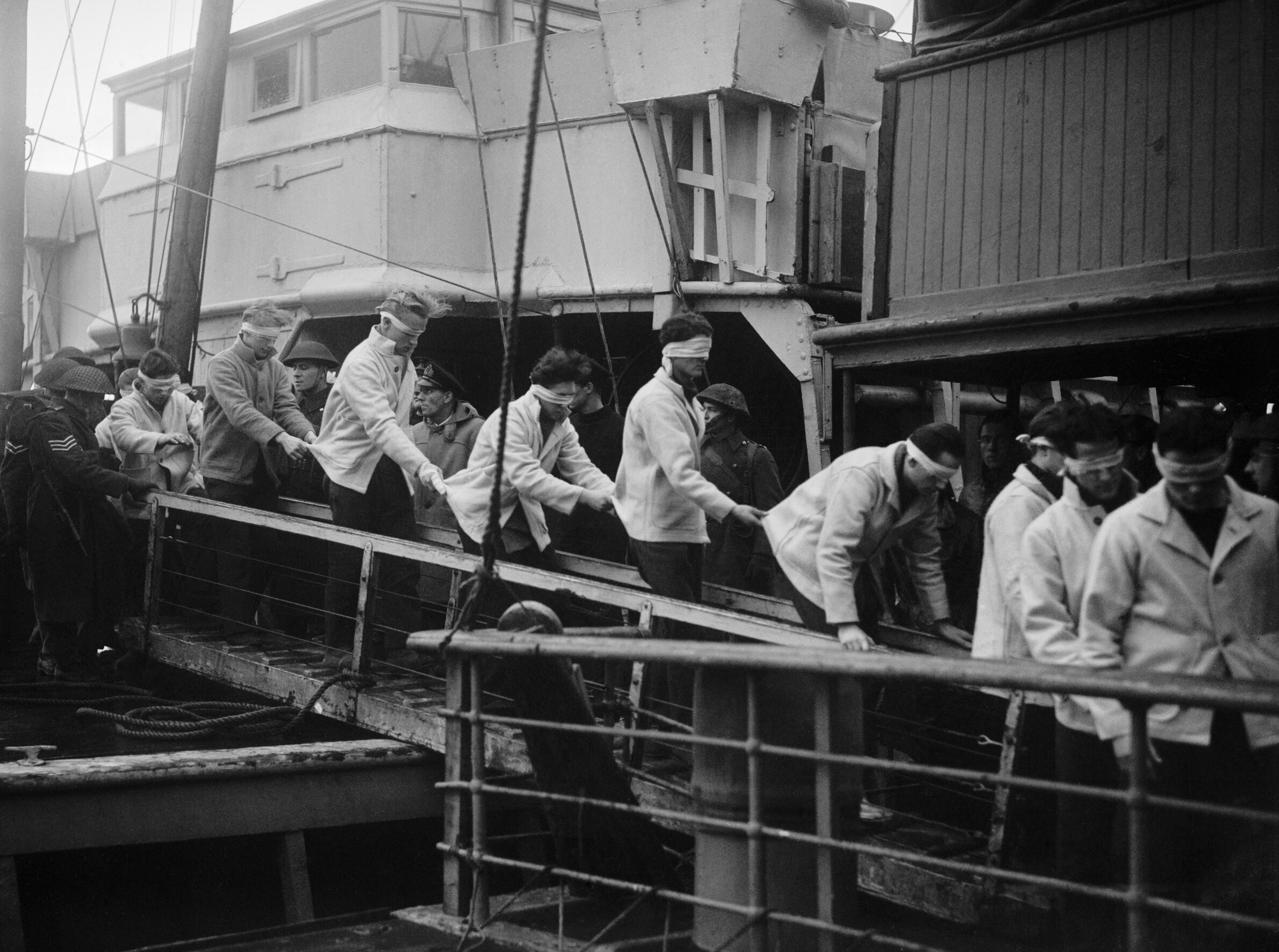
Blindfolded Scharnhorst survivors come ashore at Scapa Flow on 2 January 1944

Later in the evening of 26 December, Admiral Fraser briefed his officers on board Duke of York: "Gentlemen, the battle against Scharnhorst has ended in victory for us. I hope that if any of you are ever called upon to lead a ship into action against an opponent many times superior, you will command your ship as gallantly as Scharnhorst was commanded today". After the battle Admiral Fraser sent the following message to the Admiralty: "... Please convey to the C-in-C Norwegian Navy. Stord played a very daring role in the fight and I am very proud of her...". In an interview in the Evening News on 5 February 1944 the commanding officer of HMS Duke of York, Captain Guy Russell, said: "... the Norwegian destroyer Stord carried out the most daring attack of the whole action...".

The loss of Scharnhorst demonstrated the vital importance of radar in modern naval warfare. While the German battleship should have been able to outgun all of her opponents save the battleship Duke of York, the early loss of radar-assisted fire control combined with the problem of inclement weather left her at a significant disadvantage. Scharnhorst was straddled by 31 of the 52 radar-fire-controlled salvoes fired by Duke of York. In the aftermath of the battle, the Kriegsmarine commander, Großadmiral Karl Dönitz remarked, "Surface ships are no longer able to fight without effective radar equipment."

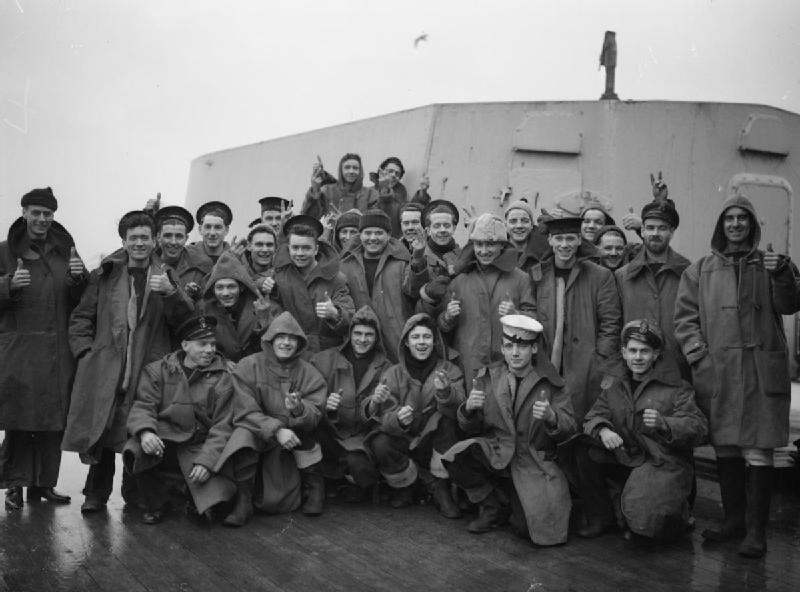
Members of Sheffield's gun crews after the battle of the North Cape

The sinking of the Scharnhorst was a major victory for the Allied war effort in the Arctic theatre and further altered the strategic balance at sea in their favour. The Battle of the North Cape took place only a few months after the successful Operation Source, which had severely damaged the German battleship Tirpitz with midget submarines as she lay at anchor in Norway. With Scharnhorst destroyed and Germany's other battleships out of service, the Allies were now for the first time in the war free from the threat of German battleships raiding their convoys in the Arctic and Atlantic. This would allow the Allies to reallocate their naval resources that had been previously tied up to counter the threat of the German 'fleet in being'. This would prove to be the final battle of battleships in European waters and was one of few major surface actions in the Second World War without air support.

== See also ==
- Arctic naval operations of World War II
