= Bruce Fraser, 1st Baron Fraser of North Cape =

Royal Navy Admiral of the Fleet (1888–1981)

Admiral of the Fleet The Right Honourable The Lord Fraser of North Cape GCB KBE
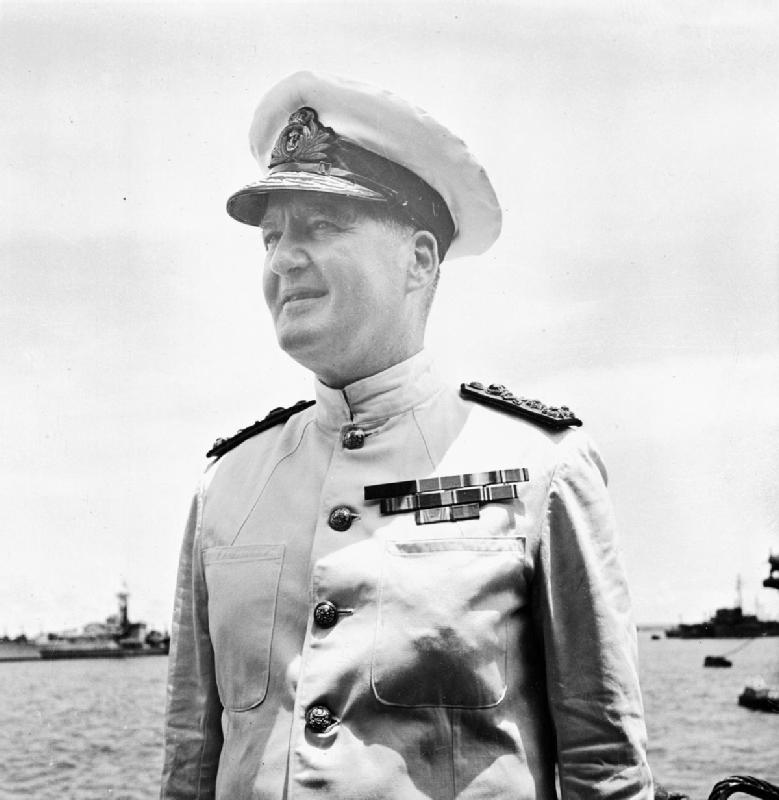
- Admiral Sir Bruce Fraser on board HMS Duke of York at Guam
- Born: 5 February 1888; Acton, England
- Died: 12 February 1981 (aged 93); London, England
- Relatives: General Alexander Fraser (father)
- Military career
- Allegiance: United Kingdom
- Branch: Royal Navy
- Service years: 1904–1951
- Rank: Admiral of the Fleet
- Commands: First Sea Lord (1948–51); Commander-in-Chief, Portsmouth (1947–48); British Pacific Fleet (1944–45); Eastern Fleet (1944); Home Fleet (1943–44); 2nd Battle Squadron (1942–43); HMS Glorious (1936–37); HMS Effingham (1929–32)
- Conflicts: First World War; Russian Civil War; Second World War; Battle of North Cape; Battle of Okinawa; Volcano and Ryukyu Islands campaign
- Awards: Knight Grand Cross of the Order of the Bath; Knight Commander of the Order of the British Empire; Grand Officer of the Order of Orange-Nassau (Netherlands); Order of Suvorov (Soviet Union); Legion d'Honneur (France); Croix de Guerre (France); Grand Cross of the Order of St. Olav (Norway); Grand Cross of the Order of the Dannebrog (Denmark); Navy Distinguished Service Medal (United States)

Admiral of the Fleet Bruce Austin Fraser, 1st Baron Fraser of North Cape, GCB, KBE (5 February 1888 – 12 February 1981) was a senior Royal Navy officer. He served in the First World War, saw action during the Gallipoli Campaign and took part in the internment of the German High Seas Fleet at the end of the war. He also served in the Second World War initially as Third Sea Lord and Controller of the Navy and then as second-in-command and afterwards as commander of the Home Fleet, leading the force that destroyed the German battleship Scharnhorst in the Battle of the North Cape. He went on to be First Sea Lord and Chief of the Naval Staff in which role he assisted in establishing NATO and agreed to the principle that the Supreme Allied Commander Atlantic should be an American admiral, in the face of fierce British opposition.

== Early naval career ==
Born the son of General Alexander Fraser and Monica Stores Fraser (née Smith), Fraser was educated at Bradfield College. He joined the Royal Navy as a cadet in the training ship HMS Britannia in September 1902 and passed out as a midshipman in the battleship HMS Hannibal in the Channel Fleet on 15 January 1904. He transferred to the battleship HMS Prince George in the Channel Fleet in February 1905 and, having been promoted to sub-lieutenant on 15 March 1907, he joined the battleship HMS Triumph in May 1907. He moved to the destroyer HMS Gypsy in September 1907 and, having been promoted to lieutenant on 15 March 1908, he joined the cruiser HMS Lancaster in the Mediterranean Fleet.

Fraser transferred to the Home Fleet in August 1910 and remained there serving in HMS Boadicea until July 1911 when he joined HMS Excellent, the Royal Navy's school of Gunnery at Whale Island in Portsmouth harbour where he commenced the 'long course' to qualify as a specialist Gunnery Officer. He assisted on the Advanced Gunnery Course at the Royal Naval College, Greenwich, in 1912 and then joined the instructing staff at HMS Excellent in 1913.

Fraser served in the First World War, initially in the cruiser HMS Minerva providing naval gunfire support during the Gallipoli Campaign and then carrying troops to protect Egypt's Western frontier. He returned to HMS Excellent early in 1916 and, having been promoted to lieutenant commander on 15 March 1916, he joined the battleship HMS Resolution as Gunnery Officer at the end of the year. He spent the remainder of the War with the Grand Fleet and took part in the internment of the German High Seas Fleet in November 1918.

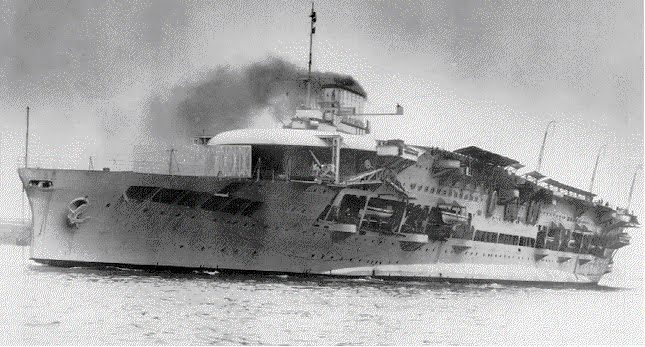
The aircraft carrier HMS Glorious, which Fraser commanded in the mid-1930s

After the war and following his promotion to commander on 30 June 1919 and his appointment as an Officer of the Order of the British Empire on 17 July 1919, Fraser volunteered to serve with the White Russian Caspian Flotilla; however on arrival in Azerbaijan as part of the 1920 Royal Navy Mission to Enzeli, he was captured and imprisoned by Bolsheviks in the Black Hole of Baku until released in November 1920. He then returned to HMS Excellent before joining the Naval Ordnance Department at the Admiralty in June 1922. He became Fleet Gunnery Officer for the Mediterranean Fleet in December 1924 and, having been promoted to captain on 30 June 1926, he became Head of the Tactical Division of the Admiralty in January 1927. He was appointed to command the cruiser HMS Effingham on the East Indies Station in September 1929 and then became Director of the Naval Ordnance Department at the Admiralty in July 1933.

Fraser returned to sea to take command of the aircraft carrier HMS Glorious in May 1936 and then became Chief Staff Officer to the Flag Officer Aircraft Carriers in 1937. He reached Flag rank as a rear admiral on 11 January 1938 and was made chief of staff to the commander-in-chief Mediterranean Fleet in April 1938. He was appointed Companion of the Order of the Bath in the 1939 New Year Honours.

== Second World War ==
In March 1939, shortly before the outset of the Second World War, Fraser was appointed Third Sea Lord and Controller of the Navy. Promoted to vice admiral on 8 May 1940, he was advanced to Knight Commander of the Order of the British Empire in the 1941 Birthday Honours and became second-in-command, Home Fleet and Flag Officer, 2nd Battle Squadron, in June 1942. He was appointed a Grand Officer of the Dutch Order of Orange-Nassau on 19 January 1943.

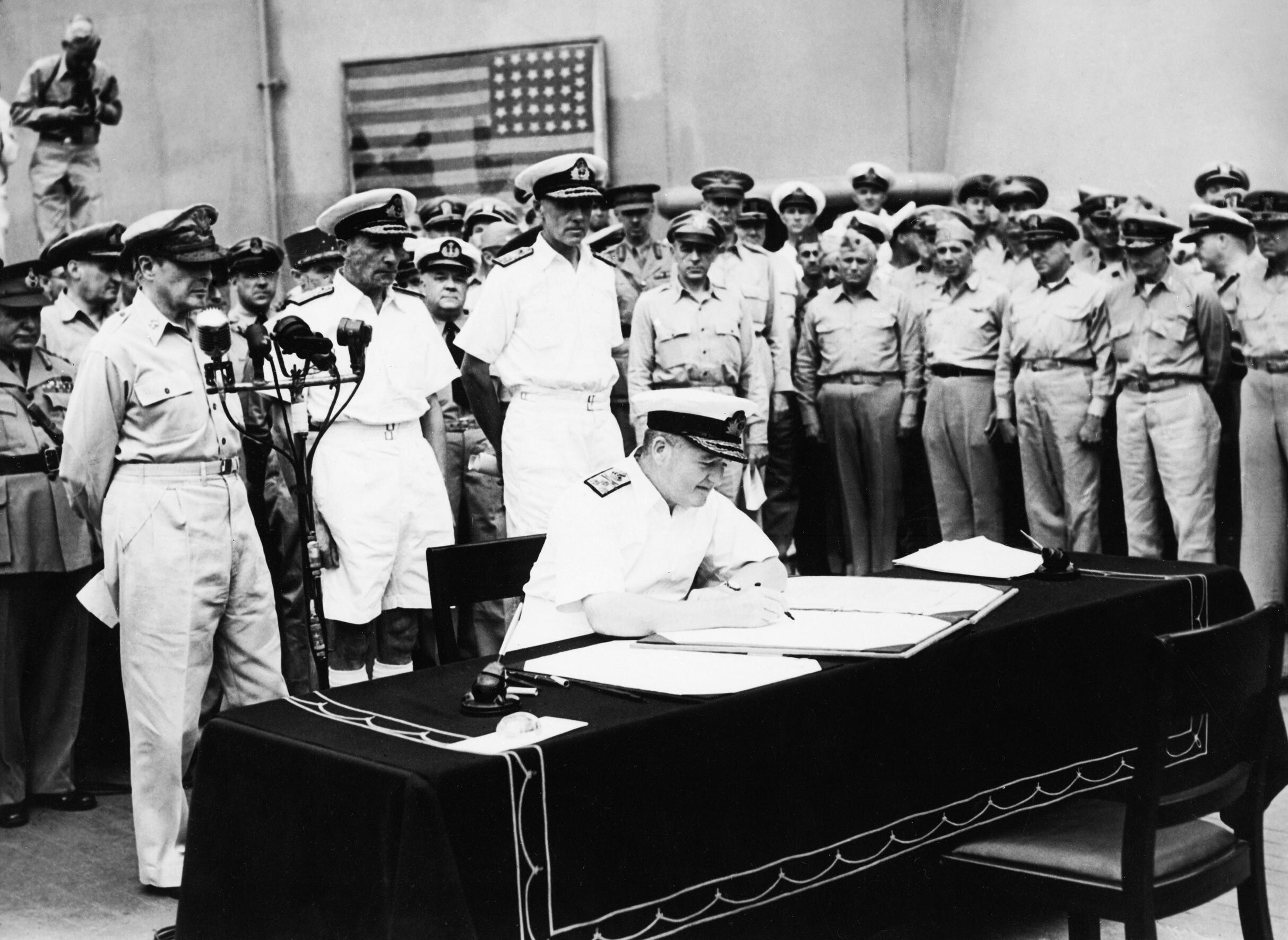
Tokyo Bay – Surrender of Japanese aboard USS Missouri. Admiral Sir Bruce Fraser, commanding British Pacific fleet, signs the Instrument of Surrender on behalf of the United Kingdom. Other British representatives stand alongside General Douglas MacArthur at the microphone.

Fraser was appointed Commander-in-Chief of the Home Fleet in May 1943 and appointed a Knight Commander of the Order of the Bath in the 1943 Birthday Honours. In the role of Commander-in-Chief of the Home Fleet, he commanded the Royal Navy force that destroyed the German battleship Scharnhorst at the Battle of the North Cape on 26 December 1943. Units of the Home Fleet regularly escorted convoys to Murmansk in the Soviet Union: Fraser was convinced that Scharnhorst would attempt an attack on Convoy JW 55B, and put to sea in his flagship HMS Duke of York to reach a position between the convoy and the German battleship's base in North Norway. Scharnhorst had her fighting ability destroyed by repeated hits from Duke of York and her speed reduced by a 14-inch shell hit to a boiler room, which deprived her of the ability to escape. She was then hit by an initial wave of four torpedoes and, after concentrated gunfire and further torpedo attacks, sank at 7.45 pm that night. Thus Fraser avenged the destruction of his old command, HMS Glorious, by Scharnhorst three years earlier. After the action Fraser and his fleet returned to Murmansk for refuelling.

For this action he was advanced to Knight Grand Cross of the Order of the Bath on 5 January 1944, and awarded the Russian Order of Suvorov, First Degree on 25 February.

Promoted to full admiral on 7 February 1944, Fraser took command of the Eastern Fleet in August 1944 and then of the British Pacific Fleet in December 1944. He commanded from ashore at his Headquarters in Sydney in Australia and built a strong relationship with the United States Navy, adopting their system of signal communications. Fraser was the British signatory to the Japanese Instrument of Surrender at Tokyo Bay on 2 September 1945.

== Later career ==
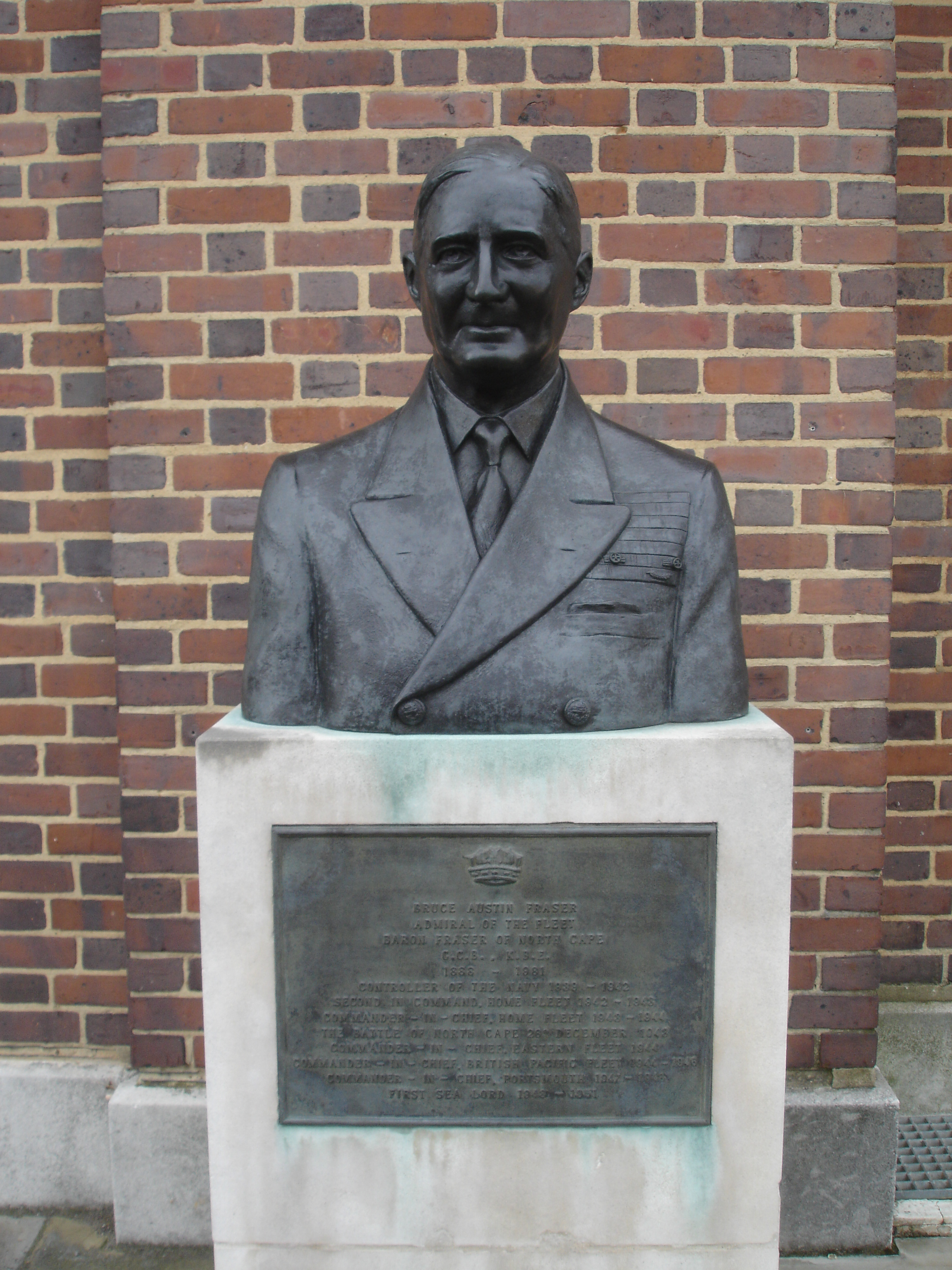
Bust of Admiral Fraser in Portsmouth Dockyard

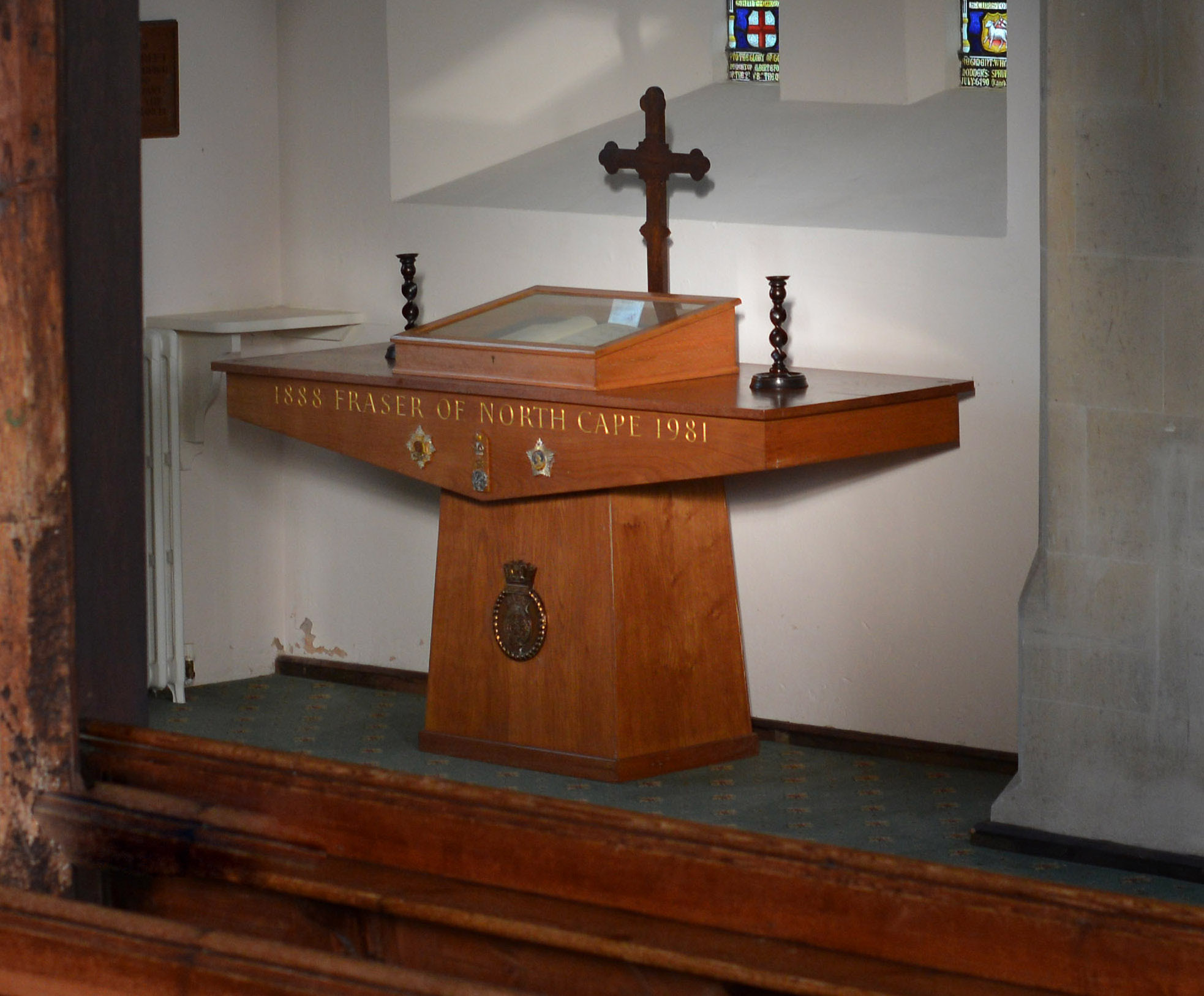
Memorial to Admiral Fraser at St Michael and All Angels Church in Thursley

On 27 April 1946 Fraser was appointed First and Principal Naval Aide-de-Camp to the King and, in September, he was raised to the peerage as Baron Fraser of North Cape, of Molesey in the County of Surrey. He became Commander-in-Chief, Portsmouth in September 1947 and First Sea Lord and Chief of the Naval Staff in September 1948, and was promoted to the rank of Admiral of the Fleet on 22 October. As First Sea Lord he assisted in establishing NATO and agreed to the principle that the Supreme Allied Commander Atlantic (SACLANT) should be an American admiral, in the face of fierce British opposition. He retired in December 1951 and died, unmarried, in London on 12 February 1981, one week after his birthday at the age of 93, upon which the barony became extinct.

== Sources ==
- Golovko, Admiral Arseni G. (1965). With the Red Fleet: the war memoirs of the late Admiral Arseni G. Golovko. London: Putnam.
- Heathcote, Tony (2002). The British Admirals of the Fleet 1734 – 1995. Pen & Sword Ltd. ISBN 0-85052-835-6.
- Howland, Vernon W., Captain, RCN (1994). "The Loss of HMS Glorious: An Analysis of the Action". Warship International. XXXI (1). Toledo, OH: International Naval Research Organization: 47–62. Archived from the original on 22 May 2001.

Military offices
Preceded by Sir Reginald Henderson	Third Sea Lord and Controller of the Navy; 1939–1942	Succeeded by Sir Frederic Wake-Walker
Preceded by Sir John Tovey	Commander-in-Chief, Home Fleet; 1943–1944	Succeeded by Sir Henry Moore
Preceded by Sir James Somerville	Commander-in-Chief, Eastern Fleet; 1944	Succeeded by Sir Denis Boyd
Preceded by Sir Geoffrey Layton	Commander-in-Chief, Portsmouth; 1947–1948	Succeeded by Sir Algernon Willis
Preceded by Sir John Cunningham	First Sea Lord; 1948–1951	Succeeded by Sir Rhoderick McGrigor
Honorary titles
Preceded by The Lord Tovey	First and Principal Naval Aide-de-Camp; 1946–1948	Succeeded by Sir Henry Moore
